= List of deaf world records in swimming =

The Deaf world records in swimming are the fastest ever performances of deaf athletes, which are recognised and ratified by the International Committee of Sports for the Deaf (ICSD) and FINA.

All records were set in finals unless noted otherwise.

== Long Course (50 m) ==
=== Men ===
Event	Time		Name	Nationality	Date	Meet	Location	Ref
50 m freestyle	23.14		Matthew Klotz	United States	25 July 2018	-	Irvine, United States	
50 m freestyle	23.12	#	Sultanov Illia	Ukraine	5 May 2024	Champions Ukraine	Brovary, Ukraine	
50 m freestyle	23.00	#	Illia Sultanov	Ukraine	25 November 2025	Deaflympics	Tokyo, Japan	
50 m freestyle	22.85	not ratified	Matthew Klotz	United States	2 August 2019	USA Phillips 66 Summer National Time Trials	Stanford, United States	
100 m freestyle	51.22		Marcus Titus	United States	17 August 2015	World Deaf Championships	San Antonio, United States	
100 m freestyle	50.88	#	Sultanov Illia	Ukraine	7 May 2024	Champions Ukraine	Brovary, Ukraine	
200 m freestyle	1:52.55		Guilherme Kabbach	Brazil	24 July 2017	Deaflympics	Samsun, Turkey	
400 m freestyle	3:53.42		Jeffrey Float	United States	23 August 1978	World Championships	West Berlin, West Germany	
800 m freestyle	8:17.56	†	Satoi Fujihara	Japan	25 July 2017	Deaflympics	Samsun, Turkey	
1500 m freestyle	15:37.64		Satoi Fujihara	Japan	25 July 2017	Deaflympics	Samsun, Turkey	
50m backstroke	25.95		Matthew Klotz	United States	27 July 2018	-	Irvine, United States	
50m backstroke	25.94	#	Matthew Klotz	United States	23 November 2025	Deaflympics	Tokyo, Japan	
50m backstroke	25.75	tt, not ratified	Matthew Klotz	United States	June 2021	United States Olympic Swimming Trials	Omaha, United States	
100m backstroke	56.06	h	Matthew Klotz	United States	18 June 2016	Tiger Aquatics Summer Classic	Baton Rouge, United States	
200m backstroke	2:01.96		Matthew Klotz	United States	22 July 2017	Deaflympics	Samsun, Turkey	
50m breaststroke	27.79		Marcus Titus	United States	7 August 2011	World Deaf Championships	Coimbra, Portugal	
100m breaststroke	1:00.00		Marcus Titus	United States	7 July 2009	US Championships	Indianapolis, United States	
200m breaststroke	2:12.50		Terence Parkin	South Africa	20 September 2000	Olympic Games	Sydney, Australia	
50m butterfly	24.75		Andrei Zhivaev	Russia	22 July 2017	Deaflympics	Samsun, Turkey	
50m butterfly	24.13	#	Illia Sultanov	Ukraine	20 November 2025	Deaflympics	Tokyo, Japan	
100m butterfly	53.90		Ilya Trishkin	Russia	7 September 2009	Deaflympics	Taipei, Chinese Taipei	
200m butterfly	2:01.71		Luca Germano	Italy	8 August 2011	World Deaf Championships	Coimbra, Portugal	
200m individual medley	2:03.33	h	Terence Parkin	South Africa	20 September 2000	Olympic Games	Sydney, Australia	
400m individual medley	4:16.92		Terence Parkin	South Africa	17 September 2000	Olympic Games	Sydney, Australia	
4×100m freestyle relay	3:28.49		Ilya Sarykin (52.09); Andrei Zhivaev (51.70); Vitalii Obotin (52.06); Miron Denisov (52.64)	Russia	26 July 2017	Deaflympics	Samsun, Turkey	
4×200m freestyle relay	7:40.91		Andrei Zhivaev (1:55.60); Aleksandr Grishin (1:58.80); Mikhaylovi Denisov (1:52.82); Vitalii Obotin (1:53.69)	Russia	21 July 2017	Deaflympics	Samsun, Turkey	
4×100m medley relay	3:48.86		Igor Zhuravlev (58.24); Martin Fomin (1:03.58); Andrei Zhivaev (55.50); Miron Denisov (51.54)	Russia	24 July 2017	Deaflympics	Samsun, Turkey	

Legend: # – Record awaiting ratification by CISS, FINA; e – equalled existing record;
Records not set in finals: h – heat; sf – semifinal; r – relay 1st leg; rh – relay heat 1st leg; b – B final; † – en route to final mark; so – swim-off; tt – time trial

=== Women ===
Event	Time		Name	Nationality	Date	Meet	Location	Ref
50 m freestyle	26.15		Ganna Lytvynenko	Ukraine	12 September 2009	Deaflympics	Taipei, Chinese Taipei	
50 m freestyle	25.28	#	Viola Scotto Di Carlo	Italy	24 November 2025	Deaflympics	Tokyo, Japan	
50 m freestyle	25.00	#	Viola Scotto Di Carlo	Italy	28 June 2026	Trofeo Sette Colli	Rome, Italy	
100 m freestyle	57.29		Ganna Lytvynenko	Ukraine	9 September 2009	Deaflympics	Taipei, Chinese Taipei	
100 m freestyle	56.29	#	Viola Scotto Di Carlo	Italy	22 November 2025	Deaflympics	Tokyo, Japan	
100 m freestyle	56.10	h, #	Viola Scotto Di Carlo	Italy	16 April 2026	Italian Championships	Pozzuoli, Italy	
100 m freestyle	55.64	b, #	Viola Scotto Di Carlo	Italy	16 April 2026	Italian Championships	Pozzuoli, Italy	
200 m freestyle	2:03.65		Carli Cronk	United States	26 July 2024	-	Irvine, United States	
200 m freestyle	2:01.77	#	Carli Cronk	United States	25 November 2025	Deaflympics	Tokyo, Japan	
400 m freestyle	4:21.27		Carli Cronk	United States	14 May 2021	USA ST ASC Cinco De Mayo Invite	San Antonio, United States	
400 m freestyle	4:18.39	#	Carli Cronk	United States	20 November 2025	Deaflympics	Tokyo, Japan	
800 m freestyle	9:09.73		Elizabeth Lutz	United States	28 July 1981	Deaflympics	Cologne, West Germany	
800 m freestyle	8:57.93	not ratified	Carli Cronk	United States	3 August 2021	USA Speedo Summer Championships	Irvine, United States	
1500 m freestyle	17:33.90		Carli Cronk	United States	4 May 2022	Deaflympics	Caxias do Sul, Brazil	
1500 m freestyle	17:28.46	#	Katy Wun	Great Britain	15 April 2026	British Championships	London, United Kingdom	
50m backstroke	29.34		Olga Kliuchnikova	Russia	24 July 2017	Deaflympics	Samsun, Turkey	
50m backstroke	29.28	#	Viola Scotto Di Carlo	Italy	22 November 2025	Deaflympics	Tokyo, Japan	
100m backstroke	1:02.61		Olga Kliuchnikova	Russia	21 July 2017	Deaflympics	Samsun, Turkey	
200m backstroke	2:17.15		Olga Kliuchnikova	Russia	26 July 2017	Deaflympics	Samsun, Turkey	
50m breaststroke	31.97		Mariia Rezhylo	Ukraine	28 August 2019	World Deaf Championships	São Paulo, Brazil	
100m breaststroke	1:11.53		Aksana Petrushenka	Belarus	20 August 2015	World Deaf Championships	San Antonio, United States	
200m breaststroke	2:35.65		Aksana Petrushenka	Belarus	8 August 2011	World Deaf Championships	Coimbra, Portugal	
50m butterfly	27.48		Olga Kliuchnikova	Russia	25 August 2019	World Deaf Championships	São Paulo, Brazil	
50m butterfly	26.49	#	Viola Scotto Di Carlo	Italy	24 November 2025	Deaflympics	Tokyo, Japan	
50m butterfly	26.01	#	Viola Scotto Di Carlo	Italy	26 June 2026	Trofeo Sette Colli	Rome, Italy	
100m butterfly	1:01.31		Carli Cronk	United States	24 June 2022	ST AAAA NS George Block	San Antonio, United States	
100m butterfly	59.13	#	Carli Cronk	United States	20 November 2025	Deaflympics	Tokyo, Japan	
100m butterfly	59.12	#	Viola Scotto Di Carlo	Italy	31 May 2026	Mare Nostrum	Barcelona, Spain	
100m butterfly	58.76	#	Viola Scotto Di Carlo	ITA	27 June 2026	Trofeo Sette Colli	Rome, Italy	
200m butterfly	2:11.06		Carli Cronk	United States	7 July 2022	USA Speedo Summer Sectionals	Austin, United States	
200m butterfly	2:10.84	#	Carli Cronk	United States	23 November 2025	Deaflympics	Tokyo, Japan	
200m individual medley	2:19.35		Olga Kliuchnikova	Russia	22 July 2017	Deaflympics	Samsun, Turkey	
400m individual medley	4:58.53		Carli Cronk	United States	7 May 2022	Deaflympics	Caxias do Sul, Brazil	
400m individual medley	4:48.53	'#'	Carli Cronk	United States	9 July 2022	USA Speedo Summer Sectionals	Austin, United States	
4×100m freestyle relay	3:54.73		Maria Karpova (58.68); Alena Alekseeva (59.27); Viktoriia Terenteva (57.75); Eleonora Brykanova (59.03)	Russia	22 July 2017	Deaflympics	Samsun, Turkey	
4×200m freestyle relay	8:45.71		Maria Karpova (2:12.30); Ekaterina Savchenko (2:13.42); Eleonora Brykanova (2:14.18); Viktoriia Terenteva (2:05.81)	Russia	25 July 2017	Deaflympics	Samsun, Turkey	
4×100m medley relay	4:20.88		Olga Kliuchnikova (1:03.28); Ekaterina Kulikova (1:14.75); Ekaterina Savchenko (1:04.98); Viktoriia Terenteva (57.87)	Russia	20 July 2017	Deaflympics	Samsun, Turkey	

Legend: # – Record awaiting ratification by CISS, FINA; e – equalled existing record;
Records not set in finals: h – heat; sf – semifinal; r – relay 1st leg; rh – relay heat 1st leg; b – B final; † – en route to final mark; so – swim-off; tt – time trial

=== Mixed Relay ===
Event	Time		Name	Nationality	Date	Meet	Location	Ref
4×100m freestyle relay	3:41.03		Vitalii Obotin; Eleonora Brykanova; Miron Denisov; Viktoriia Terenteva	Russia	5 July 2018	-	Lublin, Poland	
4×100 m freestyle relay	3:39.66	#	Marcus Titus (52.92); Brooke Thompson (58.97); Matthew Klotz (52.85); Carli Cronk (54.92)	United States	24 November 2025	Deaflympics	Tokyo, Japan	
4×100m medley relay	4:01.97		Olga Kliuchnikova; Ilya Sarykin; Martin Fomin; Viktoriia Terenteva	Russia	3 July 2018			
4×100 m medley relay	3:58.57	#	Matthew Klotz (57.54); Marcus Titus (1:03.21); Carli Cronk (58.75); Brooke Thompson (59.07)	United States	22 November 2025	Deaflympics	Tokyo, Japan	

Legend: # – Record awaiting ratification by CISS, FINA; e – equalled existing record;
Records not set in finals: h – heat; so – swim-off

== Short Course (25 m) ==
=== Men ===
Event	Time		Name	Nationality	Date	Meet	Location	Ref
50m freestyle	22.82		Andrei Zhivaev	Russia	17 November 2021	World Deaf Championships	Gliwice, Poland	
100m freestyle	49.74		Andrei Zhivaev	Russia	19 November 2021	World Deaf Championships	Gliwice, Poland	
200m freestyle	1:49.54		Vitalii Obotin	Russia	17 January 2014	Deaf International Championships	Rochester, United States	
400m freestyle	3:55.68		Terence Parkin	South Africa	25 September 2009	-	Durban, South Africa	
800m freestyle	8:07.36		Terence Parkin	South Africa	27 September 2009	-	Durban, South Africa	
1500m freestyle	15:42:52		Artur Pióro	Poland	17 December 2011	Polish Championships	Poznań, Poland	
50m backstroke	25.34		Mark Troshin	Russia	17 November 2021	World Deaf Championships	Gliwice, Poland	
100m backstroke	55.11		Lars Kochmann	Germany	16 November 2021	World Deaf Championships	Gliwice, Poland	
200m backstroke	2:00.73		Mark Troshin	Russia	20 November 2021	World Deaf Championships	Gliwice, Poland	
50m breaststroke	27.71		Marcus Titus	United States	15 January 2014	Deaf International Championships	Rochester, United States	
100m breaststroke	1:00.08		Marcus Titus	United States	16 January 2014	Deaf International Championships	Rochester, United States	
200m breaststroke	2:08.91		Terence Parkin	South Africa	26 January 2002	World Cup	Berlin, Germany	
50m butterfly	24.18	not ratified	Denis Martynenko	Russia	16 November 2021	World Deaf Championships	Gliwice, Poland	
100m butterfly	53.68	not ratified	Denis Martynenko	Russia	18 November 2021	World Deaf Championships	Gliwice, Poland	
200m butterfly	2:00.01		Ryutaro Ibara	Japan	29 September 2024	Japan Deaf Swimming Championships	Wakayama, Japan	
100m individual medley	56.01		Vitalii Obotin	Russia	16 January 2014	Deaf International Championships	Rochester, United States	
200m individual medley	1:58.64		Terence Parkin	South Africa	21 January 2002	World Cup	Stockholm, Sweden	
400m individual medley	4:10.39		Terence Parkin	South Africa	26 January 2002	World Cup	Berlin, Germany	
4×50m freestyle relay	1:31.28		Mark Troshin (23.76); Andrei Zhivaev (22.89); Vitalii Obotin (22.35); Miron Denisov (22.28)	Russia	18 November 2021	World Deaf Championships	Gliwice, Poland	
4×100m freestyle relay	3:22.77		Andrei Zhivaev (50.21); Miron Denisov (50.07); Mark Troshin (50.91); Vitaly Kalugin (51.58)	Russia	15 November 2021	World Deaf Championships	Gliwice, Poland	
4×200m freestyle relay	7:36.10		Fernando Muratov (1:53.55); Vitalii Obotin (1:49.05); Filipp Torishnii (1:57.24); Vitaly Kalugin (1:56.26)	Russia	18 November 2021	World Deaf Championships	Gliwice, Poland	
4×50m medley relay	1:40.28		Mark Troshin (25.64); Martin Fomin (28.43); Denis Martynenko (23.59); Vitalii Obotin (22.62)	Russia	19 November 2021	World Deaf Championships	Gliwice, Poland	
4×100m medley relay	3:39.50		Mark Troshin (55.51); Alexander Dyatlov (1:00.59); Denis Martynenko (53.87); Andrei Zhivaev (49.53)	Russia	20 November 2021	World Deaf Championships	Gliwice, Poland	

Legend: # – Record awaiting ratification by CISS, FINA; e – equalled existing record;
Records not set in finals: h – heat; sf – semifinal; r – relay 1st leg; rh – relay heat 1st leg; b – B final; † – en route to final mark; so – swim-off; tt – time trial

=== Women ===
Event	Time		Name	Nationality	Date	Meet	Location	Ref
50m freestyle	25.56	#	Zane Embrekte	Latvia	19 November 2021	World Deaf Championships	Gliwice, Poland	
50m freestyle	24.53	#	Viola Scotto Di Carlo	Italy	13 December 2025	Italian Championships	Riccione, Italy	
100m freestyle	56.10		Danielle Joyce	Great Britain	9 December 2016	Scottish Championships	Edinburgh, United Kingdom	
100m freestyle	53.80	#	Viola Scotto Di Carlo	Italy	12 December 2025	Italian Championships	Riccione, Italy	
100m freestyle	53.61	#	Viola Scotto Di Carlo	Italy	7 February 2026	IV. Trofeo Citta di Pozzuoli	Pozzuoli, Italy	
200m freestyle	2:03.54		Viktoriia Terenteva	Russia	15 November 2021	World Deaf Championships	Gliwice, Poland	
400m freestyle	4:19.21		Polina Bilalova	Russia	18 November 2021	World Deaf Championships	Gliwice, Poland	
800m freestyle	9:04.03	not ratified	Polina Bilalova	Russia	16 November 2021	World Deaf Championships	Gliwice, Poland	
800m freestyle	9:00.91	#	Katy Wun	Great Britain	11 December 2025	British Winter Championships	Sheffield, United Kingdom	
1500m freestyle	18:19.82		Linda Neumann	Germany	7 November 2014	Berlin Championships	Berlin, Germany	
1500m freestyle	17:11.73	#	Katy Wun	Great Britain	13 December 2025	British Winter Championships	Sheffield, United Kingdom	
50m backstroke	28.57	#	Olga Kliuchnikova	Russia	18 November 2021	World Deaf Championships	Gliwice, Poland	
50m backstroke	27.57	#	Viola Scotto Di Carlo	Italy	11 December 2025	Italian Championships	Riccione, Italy	
100m backstroke	1:01:89		Olga Kliuchnikova	Russia	20 November 2021	World Deaf Championships	Gliwice, Poland	
200m backstroke	2:18.75	h	Danielle Joyce	Great Britain	10 December 2016	Scottish Championships	Edinburgh, United Kingdom	
50m breaststroke	32.55		Aksana Petrushenka	Belarus	15 November 2021	World Deaf Championships	Gliwice, Poland	
100m breaststroke	1:10.37		Aksana Petrushenka	Belarus	18 November 2021	World Deaf Championships	Gliwice, Poland	
200m breaststroke	2:31.93		Aksana Petrushenka	Belarus	20 November 2021	World Deaf Championships	Gliwice, Poland	
50m butterfly	26.41	#	Viola Scotto Di Carlo	Italy	30 November 2025	I. Memorial Franco Sodano	Pozzuoli, Italy	
50m butterfly	26.04	#	Viola Scotto Di Carlo	Italy	12 December 2025	2025 Italian Short Course Championship	Riccione, Italy	
100m butterfly	58.78		Viola Scotto Di Carlo	Italy	11 December 2025	2025 Italian Short Course Championship	Riccione, Italy	
200m butterfly	2:18.57		Polina Bilalova	Russia	16 November 2021	World Deaf Championships	Gliwice, Poland	
100m individual medley	1:02.93		Olga Klichunikova	Russia	17 November 2021	World Deaf Championships	Gliwice, Poland	
200m individual medley	2:19.21		Polina Bilalova	Russia	19 November 2021	World Deaf Championships	Gliwice, Poland	
400m individual medley	4:54.10	not ratified or later rescinded	Polina Bilalova	Russia	15 November 2021	World Deaf Championships	Gliwice, Poland	
400m individual medley	4:45.81	'#'	Carli Cronk	United States	18 October 2025	World Cup	Westmont, United States	
4×50m freestyle relay	1:45.70		Olga Kliuchnikova (26.09); Eleonora Brykanova (26.60); Daria Tanyan (26.45); Viktoriia Terenteva (26.56)	Russia	20 November 2021	World Deaf Championships	Gliwice, Poland	
4×100m freestyle relay	3:52.40		Olga Kliuchnikova (57.44); Daria Tanyan (58.85); Eleonora Brykanova (58.43); Viktoriia Terenteva (58.30)	Russia	15 November 2021	World Deaf Championships	Gliwice, Poland	
4×200m freestyle relay	8:29.22		Olga Kliuchnikova (2:08.29); Daria Tanyan (2:11.06); Viktoriia Terenteva (2:04.52); Polina Bilalova (2:05.35)	Russia	19 November 2021	World Deaf Championships	Gliwice, Poland	
4×50m medley relay	1:57.93		Eleonora Brykanova (30.12); Kristina Shaiakhemtova (33.63); Olga Kliuchnikova (26.78); Polina Zemskova (27.40)	Russia	16 November 2021	World Deaf Championships	Gliwice, Poland	
4×100m medley relay	4:17.64		Olga KliuchnikovaEleonora Brykanova (1:02.88); Kristina Shaiakhemtova (1:13.66); Polina Bilalova (1:03.73); Viktoriia Terenteva (57.37)	Russia	20 November 2021	World Deaf Championships	Gliwice, Poland	

Legend: # – Record awaiting ratification by CISS, FINA; e – equalled existing record;
Records not set in finals: h – heat; sf – semifinal; r – relay 1st leg; rh – relay heat 1st leg; b – B final; † – en route to final mark; so – swim-off; tt – time trial

== See also ==
- List of World Deaf Swimming Championships records
- List of deaf world records in athletics
