= Swimming at the 2025 Summer Deaflympics =

Deaflympics event

- Venue: Tokyo Aquatics Centre, Japan
- Dates: 20–25 November 2025
- Competitors: ? in 42 events (20 M, 20 W, 2 X)

Swimming at the 2025 Summer Deaflympics was held from 20 to 25 November 2025 at Tokyo Aquatics Centre in Tokyo, Japan.

42 medal events were held, consists of 20 men's events, 20 women's events and two mixed events.

== Medal table ==
* Host nation (Japan)

Rank	NDSC	Gold	Silver	Bronze	Total
1	United States	12	3	8	23
2	Ukraine	8	13	2	23
3	Italy	7	6	3	16
4	Great Britain	5	3	3	11
–	Individual Neutral Athletes	4	2	2	8
5	Japan*	3	4	5	12
6	China	2	1	6	9
7	Australia	1	2	0	3
8	Hungary	0	4	1	5
9	Poland	0	3	5	8
10	Latvia	0	1	1	2
11	Croatia	0	0	3	3
12	Cyprus	0	0	1	1
12	Germany	0	0	1	1
12	Sweden	0	0	1	1
Totals (14 entries)		42	42	42	126

== Medalists ==
=== Men ===
Event	Gold		Silver		Bronze	
50 m freestyle	Illia Sultanov; Ukraine	23.00 DWR	Matthew Klotz; United States	23.05	Rudolfs Stupans; Sweden	23.33
100 m freestyle	Denys Nakonechnyi; Ukraine	50.93 DWR	Illia Sultanov; Ukraine	51.18	Andreas Gabrili; Cyprus	51.80
200 m freestyle	Ryutaro Ibara; Japan	1:54.72	Illia Sultanov; Ukraine	1:55.89	Rafal Wojcik; Poland	1:56.25
400 m freestyle	Myroslav Boldyrev; Ukraine	4:04.24	Ryutaro Ibara; Japan	4:05.11	Konrad Powroznik; Poland	4:07.61
800 m freestyle	Federico Tamborrino; Italy	8:27.51	Myroslav Boldyrev; Ukraine	8:28.26	Zhang Yilin; China	8:30.41
1500 m freestyle	Federico Tamborrino; Italy	16:11.97	Myroslav Boldyrev; Ukraine	16:22.73	Zhang Yilin; China	16:30.19
50 m backstroke	Matthew Klotz; United States	25.94 DWR	Vladyslav Kremliakov; Ukraine	26.94	Yoshikazu Kanaji; Japan	27.33
100 m backstroke	Matthew Klotz; United States	57.54	Vladyslav Kremliakov; Ukraine	58.77	Lars Kochmann; Germany	59.12
200 m backstroke	Vladyslav Kremliakov; Ukraine	2:06.08	Mark Troshin; Individual Neutral Athletes	2:07.75	Matthew Klotz; United States	2:09.62
50 m breaststroke	Marcus Titus; United States	28.24 DR	Denys Nakonechnyi; Ukraine	28.61	Oleksii Kolomiiets; Ukraine	28.81
100 m breaststroke	Marcus Titus; United States	1:02.51 DR	Denys Nakonechnyi; Ukraine	1:02.86	Nikola Zdrilic; Croatia	1:03.59
200 m breaststroke	Oleksii Kolomiiets; Ukraine	2:18.11	Denys Nakonechnyi; Ukraine	2:18.61	Nikola Zdrilic; Croatia	2:19.57
50 m butterfly	Illia Sultanov; Ukraine	24.13 DWR	Denys Nakonechnyi; Ukraine	24.32	Matthew Klotz; United States	25.10
100 m butterfly	Stepan Skosyrskii; Individual Neutral Athletes	55.59	Ryutaro Ibara; Japan	55.92	Collin Davis; United States	56.67
200 m butterfly	Stepan Skosyrskii; Individual Neutral Athletes	2:05.13	Ryutaro Ibara; Japan	2:06.07	Illia Rytov; Ukraine	2:07.00
200 m individual medley	Ryutaro Ibara; Japan	2:06.11	Stepan Skosyrskii; Individual Neutral Athletes	2:08.20	Nikola Zdrilic; Croatia	2:08.43
400 m individual medley	Ryutaro Ibara; Japan	4:30.20	Konrad Powroznik; Poland	4:36.96	Stepan Skosyrskii; Individual Neutral Athletes	4:37.98
4 × 100 m freestyle relay	Ukraine; Illia Sultanov; Vladyslav Tymofeiev; Myroslav Boldyrev; Denys Nakonechnyi; Oleksii Kolomiiets	3:29.49	United States; Collin Davis; Syler Pizzolato; Marcus Titus; Matthew Klotz; Dawson Peng	3:34.07	Poland; Igor Stempurski; Wiktor Wojciechowski; Rafal Wojcik; Konrad Powroznik; Wojciech Witecki; Dawid Dragan; Jakub Kramarczyk; Kacper Nowicki	3:36.88
4 × 200 m freestyle relay	Ukraine; Illia Sultanov; Danylo Litvin; Myroslav Boldyrev; Denys Nakonechnyi; Vladyslav Tymofeiev; Illia Rytov	7:51.17	Poland; Wiktor Wojciechowski; Rafal Wojcik; Konrad Powroznik; Kacper Nowicki; Dawid Dragan; Jakub Kramarczyk; Igor Stempurski	7:58.02	United States; Collin Davis; Syler Pizzolato; Marcus Titus; Matthew Klotz; Dawson Peng; Holden Ewan	8:05.64
4 × 100 m medley relay	United States; Collin Davis; Syler Pizzolato; Marcus Titus; Matthew Klotz; Dawson Peng; Holden Ewan	3:50.79	Ukraine; Illia Sultanov; Vladyslav Kremliakov; Oleksii Kolomiiets; Denys Nakonechnyi; Illia Rytov	3:53.07	Japan; Yoshikazu Kanaji; Taiga Hoshi; Ryutaro Ibara; Hayaki Muraoka; Vladyslav Tymofeiev; Illia Rytov	4:00.38

=== Women ===
Event	Gold		Silver		Bronze	
50 m freestyle	Viola Scotto Di Carlo; Italy	25.28 DWR	Zane Embrekte; Latvia	26.37	Brooke Thomspon; United States	26.58
100 m freestyle	Viola Scotto Di Carlo; Italy	56.29 DWR	Charlotte Gower; Great Britain	58.09	Zane Embrekte; Latvia	58.22
200 m freestyle	Carli Cronk; United States	2:01.77 DWR	Viola Scotto Di Carlo; Italy	2:02.12	Charlotte Gower; Great Britain	2:05.10
400 m freestyle	Carli Cronk; United States	4:18.39 DWR	Viola Scotto Di Carlo; Italy	4:20.64	Katy Wun; Great Britain	4:30.91
800 m freestyle	Katy Wun; Great Britain	9:13.75	Noemi Canino; Italy	9:20.41	Shen Ying; China	9:27.96
1500 m freestyle	Katy Wun; Great Britain	17:36.35	Noemi Canino; Italy	17:39.66	Tamara Boros; Hungary	17:55.03
50 m backstroke	Viola Scotto Di Carlo; Italy	29.28 DWR	Charlotte Gower; Great Britain	30.04	Klaudia Jarzewicz; Poland	31.26
100 m backstroke	Charlotte Gower; Great Britain	1:04.19	Tamara Boros; Hungary	1:07.82	Maryia Rudzko; Individual Neutral Athletes	1:07.94
200 m backstroke	Charlotte Gower; Great Britain	2:17.72	Tamara Boros; Hungary	2:22.86	Peng Huidi; China	2:22.88
50 m breaststroke	Imogen Nolan; Australia	33.69	Minami Kubo; Japan	33.83	Gaia Maragno; Italy	33.91
100 m breaststroke	Aksana Petrushenka; Individual Neutral Athletes	1:13.45	Imogen Nolan; Australia	1:14.03	Saho Kushida; Japan	1:15.19
200 m breaststroke	Aksana Petrushenka; Individual Neutral Athletes	2:39.27	Imogen Nolan; Australia	2:39.93	Saho Kushida; Japan	2:40.46
50 m butterfly	Viola Scotto Di Carlo; Italy	26.49 DWR	Carli Cronk; United States	27.10	Brooke Thomspon; United States	28.95
100 m butterfly	Carli Cronk; United States	59.13 DWR	Viola Scotto Di Carlo; Italy	59.58	Brooke Thomspon; United States	1:05.22
200 m butterfly	Carli Cronk; United States	2:10.84 DWR	Viola Scotto Di Carlo; Italy	2:18.97	Peng Huidi; China	2:20.80
200 m individual medley	Charlotte Gower; Great Britain	2:21.95	Tamara Boros; Hungary	2:25.56	Julia Dragan; Poland	2:27.84
400 m individual medley	Carli Cronk; United States	4:55.47 DR	Tamara Boros; Hungary	5:07.17	Katy Wun; Great Britain	5:11.42
4 × 100 m freestyle relay	China; Yang Hanying; Ren Feiyan; Peng Huidi; Shen Ying; Huang Xiaofan; Xu Xueyan	4:00.23	Poland; Weronika Nowicka; Julia Chmielewska; Klaudia Jarzewicz; Julia Dragan	4:05.48	Italy; Noemi Canino; Chiara Somenzi; Viola Scotto Di Carlo; Gaia Maragno; Jessica Diddoro	4:06.37
4 × 200 m freestyle relay	Italy; Noemi Canino; Viola Scotto Di Carlo; Gaia Maragno; Jessica Diddoro; Chiara Somenzi	8:49.09	China; Yang Hanying; Ren Feiyan; Peng Huidi; Shen Ying; Huang Xiaofan; Xu Xueyan; Jin Xueyan; Dong Jinchan	8:49.34	United States; Samantha Fujii; Quinn Cannon; Brooke Thompson; Carli Cronk; Matthea Gaines; Ava Pruden	9:02.23
4 × 100 m medley relay	China; Peng Huidi; Xu Xueyan; Yang Hanying; Shen Ying; Huang Xiaofan; Ren Feiyan; Dong Jinchan; Jin Xueyan	4:30.77	Great Britain; Charlotte Gower; Nicola Hutchison; Lucy Jordan-Caws; Katy Wun; Mia Wiseman; Ellie Graham	4:33.12	Japan; Yuna Kawamata; Saho Kushida; Kyoka Saito; Hanaka Hirabayashi; Ikuha Nakahigashi; Minami Kubo	4:34.02

=== Mixed ===
Event	Gold		Silver		Bronze	
4 × 100 m freestyle relay	United States; Matthew Klotz; Marcus Titus; Collin Davis; Carli Cronk; Brooke Thompson	3:39.66 DWR	Ukraine; Illia Sultanov; Denys Nakonechnyi; Danylo Litvin; Anastasiiya Hryhorova; Iryna Tereshchenko	3:46.55	Italy; Gianluca Vitellozzi; Luca Germano; Arseny Savchenko; Federico Tamborrino; Viola Scotto Di Carlo; Noemi Canino; Jessica Diddoro; Gaia Maragno	3:49.00
4 × 100 m medley relay	United States; Matthew Klotz; Marcus Titus; Collin Davis; Carli Cronk; Brooke Thompson; Samantha Fujii	3:58.57 DWR	Ukraine; Vladyslav Kremliakov; Denys Nakonechnyi; Anita Makhnyk; Iryna Tereshchenko	4:11.96	China; Peng Huidi; Huang Pingzhou; Zhang Yilin; Shen Ying; Li Haitao; Yang Hanying	4:12.99
