= List of deaf European records in swimming =

Deaf swimming records

The Deaf European records in swimming are the fastest recorded performances of deaf athletes, which are recognised and ratified by the International Committee of Sports for the Deaf (ICSD) and FINA.

== Long Course (50 m) ==
=== Men ===
Event	Time		Name	Nationality	Date	Meet	Location	Ref
50m freestyle	23.00	DWR	Illia Sultanov	Ukraine	25 November 2025	Deaflympics 2025	Tokyo, Japan	
100m freestyle	50.88	DWR	Illia Sultanov	Ukraine	7 May 2024	Champions Ukraine	Brovary, Ukraine	
200m freestyle	1:52.92		Miron Denisov	Russia		Deaflympics 2017	Samsun, Turkey	
400m freestyle	4:02.74		Artur Pióro	Poland	20 July 2017	Deaflympics 2017	Samsun, Turkey	
800m freestyle	8:27.51		Federico Tamborrino	Italy	23 November 2025	Deaflympics 2025	Tokyo, Japan	
1500m freestyle	16.00.93		Federico Tamborrino	Italy		Deaflympics 2017	Samsun, Turkey	
50m backstroke	26.57		Lars Kochmann	Germany	5 June 2021	-	Berlin, Germany	
100m backstroke	57.85		Lars Kochmann	Germany	-	5th World Deaf Swimming Championship	São Paulo, Brazil	
200m backstroke	2:06.08		Vladyslav Kremliakov	Ukraine	21 November 2025	Deaflympics	Tokyo, Japan	
50m breaststroke	28.44		Denys Nakonechnyi	Ukraine	22 November 2025	Deaflympics 2025	Tokyo, Japan	
100m breaststroke	1:02.86		Denys Nakonechnyi	Ukraine	25 November 2025	Deaflympics 2025	Tokyo, Japan	
200m breaststroke	2:17.96		Andriy Zurgalidze	Ukraine	8 September 2009	Deaflympics 2009	Taipei, Chinese Taipei	
50m butterfly	24.13		Illia Sultanov	Ukraine	20 November 2025	Deaflympics	Tokyo, Japan	
100m butterfly	53.90		Ilya Trishkin	Russia	7 September 2009	Deaflympics 2009	Taipei, Chinese Taipei	
200m butterfly	2:01.71		Luca Germano	Italy	8 August 2011	World Deaf Championships	Coimbra, Portugal	
200m individual medley	2:04.53		Vitalii Obotin	Russia	-	Deaflympics 2017	Samsun, Turkey	
400m individual medley	4:28.66		Vitalii Obotin	Russia	-	Deaflympics 2017	Samsun, Turkey	
4×100m freestyle relay	3:28.49		Ilya Sarykin; Andrei Zhivaev; Vitalii Obotin; Miron Denisov	Russia	-	Deaflympics 2017	Samsun, Turkey	
4×200m freestyle relay	7:40.91		Andrei Zhivaev; Leonid Grishin; Miron Denisov; Vitaly Obotin	Russia	-	Deaflympics 2017	Samsun, Turkey	
4×100m medley relay	3:39.50		Igor Zhuravlev; Martin Fomin; Andrei Zhivaev; Miron Denisov	Russia	-	Deaflympics 2017	Samsun, Turkey	

Legend: # – Record awaiting ratification by CISS, FINA;
Records not set in finals: h – heat; sf – semifinal; r – relay 1st leg; rh – relay heat 1st leg; b – B final; † – en route to final mark; so – swim-off; tt – time trial

=== Women ===
Event	Time	Name	Nationality	Date	Meet	Location	Ref
50m freestyle	25.28	Viola Scotto Di Carlo	Italy	24 November 2025	Deaflympics 2025	Tokyo, Japan	
100m freestyle	56.29	Viola Scotto Di Carlo	Italy	22 November 2025	Deaflympics	Tokyo, Japan	
200m freestyle	2:02.12	Viola Scotto Di Carlo	Italy	25 November 2025	Deaflympics 2025	Tokyo, Japan	
400m freestyle	4:20.64	Viola Scotto Di Carlo	Italy	20 November 2025	Deaflympics	Tokyo, Japan	
800m freestyle	9:13.75	Katy Wun	Great Britain	24 November 2025	Deaflympics	Tokyo, Japan	
1500m freestyle	17:28.46	Katy Wun	Great Britain	15 April 2026	Aquatics GB Championship	London, Great Britain	
50m backstroke	29.28	Viola Scotto Di Carlo	Italy	22 November 2025	Deaflympics	Tokyo, Japan	
100m backstroke	1:02.61	Olga Kliuchnikova	Russia	21 July 2017	Deaflympics	Samsun, Turkey	
200m backstroke	2:17.15	Olga Kliuchnikova	Russia	26 July 2017	Deaflympics	Samsun, Turkey	
50m breaststroke	31.97	Mariia Rezhylo	Ukraine	28 August 2019	World Deaf Championships	São Paulo, Brazil	
100m breaststroke	1:11.53	Aksana Petrushenka	Belarus	20 August 2015	World Deaf Championships	San Antonio, United States	
200m breaststroke	2:35.65	Aksana Petrushenka	Belarus	8 August 2011	World Deaf Championships	Coimbra, Portugal	
50m butterfly	26.49	Viola Scotto Di Carlo	Italy	24 November 2025	Deaflympics 2025	Tokyo, Japan	
100m butterfly	59.58	Viola Scotto Di Carlo	Italy	20 November 2025	Deaflympics	Tokyo, Japan	
200m butterfly	2:18.97	Viola Scotto Di Carlo	Italy	23 November 2025	Deaflympics 2025	Tokyo, Japan	
200m individual medley	2:19.35	Olga Kliuchnikova	Russia	22 July 2017	Deaflympics	Samsun, Turkey	
400m individual medley	5:00.96	Polina Bilalova	Russia	2 July 2018	European Deaf Championship	Lublin, Poland	
4×100m freestyle relay	3:54.73	Maria Karpova (58.68); Alena Alekseeva (59.27); Viktoriia Terenteva (57.75); Eleonora Brykanova (59.03)	Russia	22 July 2017	Deaflympics	Samsun, Turkey	
4×200m freestyle relay	8:45.71	Maria Karpova (2:12.30); Ekaterina Savchenko (2:13.42); Eleonora Brykanova (2:14.18); Viktoriia Terenteva (2:05.81)	Russia	25 July 2017	Deaflympics	Samsun, Turkey	
4×100m medley relay	4:20.88	Olga Kliuchnikova (1:03.28); Ekaterina Kulikova (1:14.75); Ekaterina Savchenko (1:04.98); Viktoriia Terenteva (57.87)	Russia	20 July 2017	Deaflympics	Samsun, Turkey	

Legend: # – Record awaiting ratification by CISS, FINA;
Records not set in finals: h – heat; sf – semifinal; r – relay 1st leg; rh – relay heat 1st leg; b – B final; † – en route to final mark; so – swim-off; tt – time trial

== Short Course (25 m) ==
=== Men ===
Event	Time		Name	Nationality	Date	Meet	Location	Ref
50m freestyle	22.82		Andrei Zhivaev	Russia	17 November 2021	World Deaf Championships	Gliwice, Poland	
100m freestyle	49.74		Andrei Zhivaev	Russia	19 November 2021	World Deaf Championships	Gliwice, Poland	
200m freestyle	1:49.54		Vitalii Obotin	Russia	17 January 2014	Deaf International Championships	Rochester, United States	
400m freestyle	3:54.82		Artur Pióro	Poland	17 December 2011	-	Poznań, Poland	
800m freestyle	8:09.26		Artur Pióro	Poland	20 December 2012	-	Ostrowiec Świętokrzyski, Poland	
1500m freestyle	15:42:52		Artur Pióro	Poland	17 December 2011	Polish Championships	Poznań, Poland	
50m backstroke	25.34		Mark Troshin	Russia	17 November 2021	World Deaf Championships	Gliwice, Poland	
100m backstroke	55.11		Lars Kochmann	Germany	16 November 2021	World Deaf Championships	Gliwice, Poland	
200m backstroke	2:00.73		Mark Troshin	Russia	20 November 2021	World Deaf Championships	Gliwice, Poland	
50m breaststroke	27.77		Oleksii Kolomiites	Ukraine	18 November 2021	1st World Deaf Short Course Swimming Championships Gliwice, 15. - 20.11.2021	Gliwice, Poland, Poland	
100m breaststroke	1:00.68		Alexander Dyatlov	Ukraine	15 November 2021	1st World Deaf Short Course Swimming Championships Gliwice, 15. - 20.11.2021	Gliwice, Poland	
200m breaststroke	2:15.32		Oleksii Kolomiites	Ukraine	20 November 2021	1st World Deaf Short Course Swimming Championships Gliwice, 15. - 20.11.2021	Gliwice, Poland	
50m butterfly	24.18		Denis Martynenko	Russia	16 November 2021	World Deaf Championships	Gliwice, Poland	
100m butterfly	53.68		Denis Martynenko	Russia	18 November 2021	World Deaf Championships	Gliwice, Poland	
200m butterfly	2:00.89	h	Björn Koch	Germany	28 November 2009	German Championships	Essen, Germany	
100m individual medley	56.01		Vitalii Obotin	Russia	16 January 2014	Deaf International Championships	Rochester, United States	
200m individual medley	2:01.43		Vitalii Obotin	Russia	20 November 2021	1st World Deaf Short Course Swimming Championships Gliwice, 15. - 20.11.2021	Gliwice, Poland	
400m individual medley	4:22.29		Konrad Powroźnik	Poland	12 December 2021	-	Olsztyn, Poland	
4×50m freestyle relay	1:31.28		Mark Troshin (23.76); Andrei Zhivaev (22.89); Vitalii Obotin (22.35); Miron Denisov (22.28)	Russia	18 November 2021	World Deaf Championships	Gliwice, Poland	
4×100m freestyle relay	3:22.77		Andrei Zhivaev (50.21); Miron Denisov (50.07); Mark Troshin (50.91); Vitaly Kalugin (51.58)	Russia	15 November 2021	World Deaf Championships	Gliwice, Poland	
4×200m freestyle relay	7:36.10		Fernando Muratov (1:53.55); Vitalii Obotin (1:49.05); Filipp Torishnii (1:57.24); Vitaly Kalugin (1:56.26)	Russia	18 November 2021	World Deaf Championships	Gliwice, Poland	
4×50m medley relay	1:40.28		Mark Troshin (25.64); Martin Fomin (28.43); Denis Martynenko (23.59); Vitalii Obotin (22.62)	Russia	19 November 2021	World Deaf Championships	Gliwice, Poland	
4×100m medley relay	3:39.50		Mark Troshin (55.51); Alexander Dyatlov (1:00.59); Denis Martynenko (53.87); Andrei Zhivaev (49.53)	Russia	20 November 2021	World Deaf Championships	Gliwice, Poland	

Legend: # – Record awaiting ratification by CISS, FINA;
Records not set in finals: h – heat; sf – semifinal; r – relay 1st leg; rh – relay heat 1st leg; b – B final; † – en route to final mark; so – swim-off; tt – time trial

=== Women ===
{{Swimmingrecord }}

Event	Time	Name	Nationality	Date	Meet	Location	Ref
50m freestyle	24.53	Viola Scotto Di Carlo	Italy	13 December 2025	Italian Championships	Riccione, Italy	
100m freestyle	53.61	Viola Scotto Di Carlo	Italy	7 February	IV. Trofeo Citta di Pozzuoli	Pozzuoli, Italy	
200m freestyle	2:03.54	Viktoriia Terenteva	Russia	15 November 2021	World Deaf Championships	Gliwice, Poland	
400m freestyle	4:19.21	Polina Bilalova	Russia	18 November 2021	World Deaf Championships	Gliwice, Poland	
800m freestyle	9:00.91	Katy Wun	Great Britain	11 December 2025	British Winter Champs	Sheffield, United Kingdom	
1500m freestyle	17:11.73	Katy Wun	Great Britain	13 December 2025	British Winter Champs	Sheffield, United Kingdom	
50m backstroke	27.60	Viola Scotto Di Carlo	Italy	30 November 2025	Prova Tempi Campionato Italiano Assoluto Invernale	Pozzuoli, Italy	
100m backstroke	1:01:89	Olga Kliuchnikova	Russia	20 November 2021	World Deaf Championships	Gliwice, Poland	
200m backstroke	2:20.33	Olga Kliuchnikova	Russia	17 November 2021	World Deaf Championships	Gliwice, Poland	
50m breaststroke	32.55	Aksana Petrushenka	Belarus	15 November 2021	World Deaf Championships	Gliwice, Poland	
100m breaststroke	1:10.37	Aksana Petrushenka	Belarus	18 November 2021	World Deaf Championships	Gliwice, Poland	
200m breaststroke	2:31.93	Aksana Petrushenka	Belarus	20 November 2021	World Deaf Championships	Gliwice, Poland	
50m butterfly	26.41	Viola Scotto Di Carlo	Italy	30 November 2025	I. Memorial Franco Sodano	Pozzuoli, Italy	
100m butterfly	58.78	Viola Scotto Di Carlo	Italy	11 December 2025	Campionato Italiano Assoluto Open - Frecciarossa	Riccione, Italy	
200m butterfly	2:18.57	Polina Bilalova	Russia	16 November 2021	World Deaf Championships	Gliwice, Poland	
100m individual medley	1:02.93	Olga Klichunikova	Russia	17 November 2021	World Deaf Championships	Gliwice, Poland	
200m individual medley	2:19.21	Polina Bilalova	Russia	19 November 2021	World Deaf Championships	Gliwice, Poland	
400m individual medley	4:54.10	Polina Bilalova	Russia	15 November 2021	World Deaf Championships	Gliwice, Poland	
4×50m freestyle relay	1:45.70	Olga Kliuchnikova (26.09); Eleonora Brykanova (26.60); Daria Tanyan (26.45); Viktoriia Terenteva (26.56)	Russia	20 November 2021	World Deaf Championships	Gliwice, Poland	
4×100m freestyle relay	3:52.40	Olga Kliuchnikova (57.44); Daria Tanyan (58.85); Eleonora Brykanova (58.43); Viktoriia Terenteva (58.30)	Russia	15 November 2021	World Deaf Championships	Gliwice, Poland	
4×200m freestyle relay	8:29.22	Olga Kliuchnikova (2:08.29); Daria Tanyan (2:11.06); Viktoriia Terenteva (2:04.52); Polina Bilalova (2:05.35)	Russia	19 November 2021	World Deaf Championships	Gliwice, Poland	
4×50m medley relay	1:57.93	Eleonora Brykanova (30.12); Kristina Shaiakhemtova (33.63); Olga Kliuchnikova (26.78); Polina Zemskova (27.40)	Russia	16 November 2021	World Deaf Championships	Gliwice, Poland	
4×100m medley relay	4:17.64	Olga Kliuchnikova (1:02.88); Kristina Shaiakhemtova (1:13.66); Polina Bilalova (1:03.73); Viktoriia Terenteva (57.37)	Russia	20 November 2021	World Deaf Championships	Gliwice, Poland	

Legend: # – Record awaiting ratification by CISS, FINA;
Records not set in finals: h – heat; sf – semifinal; r – relay 1st leg; rh – relay heat 1st leg; b – B final; † – en route to final mark; so – swim-off; tt – time trial

== See also ==
- List of World Deaf Swimming Championships records
- List of deaf world records in athletics
