= Terence Parkin =

South African swimmer (born 1980)

Personal information
- Full name: Terence Parkin
- National team: South Africa
- Born: 12 April 1980 (age 46) Bulawayo, Zimbabwe
- Height: 185 cm (6 ft 1 in)
- Weight: 85 kg (187 lb)

Sport
- Sport: Swimming
- Strokes: Breaststroke Individual Medley
- Club: Seagulls (1993-2004); Seals (2005-2025)
- Coach: Graham Hill (1993-2004); Wayne Riddin (2005-2025)
Medal record
Event	1st	2nd	3rd
Olympic Games	0	1	0
Deaflympics (Swimming)	29	3	1
Deaflympics (Cycling)	0	0	1
All Africa Games	3	1	1
Commonwealth Games	0	1	0
World Deaf Cycling Champ	1	1	0
Tour de Formosa Cycling	1	2	2
FINA Swimming World Cup	10	8	3
Pan Pacific Championships	0	0	1
Total	44	17	9
Representing South Africa
Olympic Games
Silver medal – second place	2000 Sydney	200m breaststroke
Deaflympics
Gold medal – first place	1997 Copenhagen	200m Freestyle
Gold medal – first place	1997 Copenhagen	100m Breaststroke
Gold medal – first place	1997 Copenhagen	200m Breaststroke
Gold medal – first place	1997 Copenhagen	200m Medley
Gold medal – first place	1997 Copenhagen	400m Medley
Silver medal – second place	1997 Copenhagen	100m Backstroke
Silver medal – second place	1997 Copenhagen	200m Backstroke
Gold medal – first place	2001 Rome	100m Freestyle
Gold medal – first place	2001 Rome	200m Freestyle
Gold medal – first place	2001 Rome	100m Breaststroke
Gold medal – first place	2001 Rome	200m Breaststroke
Gold medal – first place	2001 Rome	400m Medley
Gold medal – first place	2005 Melbourne	100m Freestyle
Gold medal – first place	2005 Melbourne	200m Freestyle
Gold medal – first place	2005 Melbourne	400m Freestyle
Gold medal – first place	2005 Melbourne	1500m Freestyle
Gold medal – first place	2005 Melbourne	50m Breaststroke
Gold medal – first place	2005 Melbourne	100m Breaststroke
Gold medal – first place	2005 Melbourne	200m Breaststroke
Gold medal – first place	2005 Melbourne	200m Butterfly
Gold medal – first place	2005 Melbourne	200m Medley
Gold medal – first place	2005 Melbourne	400m Medley
Gold medal – first place	2005 Melbourne	4x100m MedleyRelay
Gold medal – first place	2005 Melbourne	4x200m FreeRelay
Silver medal – second place	2005 Melbourne	4x100m FreeRelay
Gold medal – first place	2009 Taipei	200m Freestyle
Gold medal – first place	2009 Taipei	1500m Freestyle
Gold medal – first place	2009 Taipei	50m Breaststroke
Gold medal – first place	2009 Taipei	100m Breaststroke
Gold medal – first place	2009 Taipei	200m Breaststroke
Gold medal – first place	2009 Taipei	200m Medley
Gold medal – first place	2009 Taipei	400m Medley
Bronze medal – third place	2009 Taipei	100 km Cycling Road
World Deaf Cycling Championships
Silver medal – second place	2006 San Francisco	MTB Short Circuit
Gold medal – first place	2006 San Francisco	Cycling Road Race
World Championships (SC)
Silver medal – second place	2000 Athens	200 m Breaststroke
Silver medal – second place	2000 Athens	400 m Medley
Pan Pacific Championships
Bronze medal – third place	1999 Sydney	200 m Breaststroke
Commonwealth Games
Silver medal – second place	2002 Manchester	200 m breaststroke
All-Africa Games
Bronze medal – third place	1999 Johannesburg	200m Freestyle
Gold medal – first place	1999 Johannesburg	200m Breaststroke
Silver medal – second place	1999 Johannesburg	200m Medley
Gold medal – first place	1999 Johannesburg	400m Medley
Gold medal – first place	1999 Johannesburg	4x200m Free Relay
FINA Swimming World Cup
Silver medal – second place	2000 Sheffield	50m Breaststroke
Gold medal – first place	2000 Sheffield	100m Breaststroke
Gold medal – first place	2000 Sheffield	200m Breaststroke
Gold medal – first place	2000 Sheffield	200m Medley
Gold medal – first place	2000 Sheffield	400m Medley
Silver medal – second place	2000 Berlin	100m Breaststroke
Gold medal – first place	2000 Berlin	200m Breaststroke
Gold medal – first place	2000 Berlin	200m Medley
Gold medal – first place	2000 Berlin	400m Medley
Silver medal – second place	2001 Rio	200m Breaststroke
Bronze medal – third place	2001 Rio	200m Medley
Silver medal – second place	2001 Rio	400m Medley
Silver medal – second place	2002 Berlin	200m Breaststroke
Gold medal – first place	2002 Berlin	400m Medley
Gold medal – first place	2002 Stockholm	400m Medley
Bronze medal – third place	2002 Stockholm	200m Medley
Gold medal – first place	2003 Durban	200m Breaststroke
Silver medal – second place	2003 Durban	200m Medley
Silver medal – second place	2003 Durban	400m Medley
Silver medal – second place	2005 Durban	200m Breaststroke
Bronze medal – third place	2009 Durban	200m Breaststroke

Terence Mike Parkin (born 12 April 1980 in Bulawayo, Zimbabwe) is a swimmer from South Africa, who won the silver medal at the 2000 Summer Olympics in the 200m Breaststroke. Parkin, who was born deaf, also competed in the 2004 Summer Olympics, 2000 Sydney Olympics Games as well as the Deaflympics in which he took home 29 gold medals.

Nicknamed the "Silent Torpedo" and the Michael Phelps of the Deaflympics, Parkin was the only deaf swimmer to be part of the FINA's elite rankings in 1999 and 2000. He holds the record for winning the greatest number of medals in Deaflympics history with a total of 33.

== Early life ==
Parkins, who was born deaf but was not diagnosed until he was 18-months old, was the first-born child to his parents, who both lived fully hearing. According to the two, Neville and Bev - who provided the primary source of support throughout his personal and athletic life - Parkin reflected an affinity for swimming as early as age twelve. Parkin grew up with a sister who was also born without any auditory impairments. Terence has reported that his family is not fluent in any particular sign language and instead communicates through a mixture of home-made signs and oral gestures.

== Education ==
Parkin was introduced to swimming during his attendance at the Fulton School for the Deaf in KwaZulu-Natal, which teaches South African Sign Language as its primary language and English as secondary. Aiming away from practices of Oralism that have shaped many aspects of both the school's history and deaf history across greater South Africa, it is at this school that students such as Parkin have been exposed to a bilingual approach of communication that incorporates elements of both South African Sign Language and English.

In his time at Fulton School for the Deaf, reporters suggest that Parkin held an increased level of dominance over other swimmers due to the fact that he relied on his elevated visual and spatial awareness during water movement.

== Personal life ==
Parkin resides with his wife and two children in Johannesburg, South Africa, where he serves a sports coach at St. Vincent School for the Deaf. He is widely regarded as an inspiration to many young people, often sharing motivational messages such as 'The worst disability is a bad attitude!'"

In 2011, Parkin saved a young boy from drowning. Reports say the seven-year-old was submerged underwater for close to three minutes until Parkin, his swim coach, got him out of the water.

Parkin now stays active by participating in cycling, running, and swimming marathons for charitable purposes.

== Athletic career ==
The largest boost in Parkin's 15-year sporting career was set forth when he qualified for the South African national swimming team. From there, Parkin would make his first major mark in swimming history at the Midmar Mile, which is held in South Africa and is the "world's largest open-water swimming event". At age 17, he competed in his first Deaflympic games, taking seven medals in total (five gold, two silver). Three years later, Parkin competed as the only deaf swimmer in his first Olympic games. Unable to hear the crowd's standing ovation or the commentator's announcements of the final results, Parkin noticed moments after the 200-meter breaststroke that he had scored an Olympic silver medal.

Parkin, eventually claiming title as the most decorated sportsman in Deaflympics history, has been described as inspiring fellow athletes such as Roland Schoeman, who follow in the footsteps of Parkin's notoriety for an intense dedication to rigorous training regimens.

Beyond his Olympic and Deaflympic records, Parkin was also crowned World Deaf Sportsman of the Year in 1997, 2000, 2001, and 2005. Additional awards include CISS Sportsman of the Century in 2000, SA Schools' Sportsman of the Year in 2002, and Gold Presidential Awards across 2000, 2001, and 2002.

Parkin has also been known for his feats across championships of cycling and triathlons, winning first place in the 2005 World Deaf Cycling Championships’ 120km road race in California. Locally, Parkin has also been known to compete in miscellaneous sporting events such as the Dusi Canoe Marathon and the 94.7 Cycle Challenge.

Throughout his competitions in the Olympics, Deaflympics, World Cup and Pan Pacific Competitions, Parkin was driven by a desire to show the world that deaf athletes are just as capable as their hearing counterparts. Parkin aimed to be a powerful example of the opportunities available to the Deaf community.

=== Hearing aid ===
During a race, Parkin was reported to attempt to utilize a waterproof hearing aid while in the water. Afterward, he claimed that the crowd noise was highly distracting and that an absence of noise allowed him to focus on solely the race itself.

=== Additional athletic achievements ===
Beyond his career in swimming, Parkin has also been known to compete in triathlons and cycling events, even winning the 120km gold medal at the World Cycling Championship for the Deaf.

=== 2000 Sydney Olympic Games ===
Parkin competed in his first Olympic games in 2000 at the age of 20 and used sign language to communicate with his coach. About his trip to the Olympics, Parkin said "I am going to the Olympics to represent South Africa, but it's so vitally important for me to go, to show that the deaf can do anything. They can't hear, they can see everything. I would like to show the world that there's opportunities for the deaf."

== Philanthropy ==
Recently, Parkin has been honored by The Princess Charlene Foundation by being granted the position of Global Ambassador of The Deaf and Blind. Her Serene Highness, Princess Charlene, an accomplished philanthropist in her own right, chose Parkin because of his will to overcome any obstacle in his way. Using the resources granted to him in his position, Parkin has traveled the world and given talks about swimming safety. These talks include teaching children how to swim and how to avoid drowning. Some countries he has been to on behalf of the foundation are Russia, Pakistan, China, Australia and the Philippines.

Aside from his talks to children, Parkin has also taught classes on CPR, making him the only deaf CPR coach in South Africa. Parkin has also entered "1120 km Epic Challenge", a test of physical endurance, to fund raise for the Princess Charlene Foundation. Additional fundraisers Parkin has participated in include biking from Johannesburg to Midmar, running from Midmar Dam to the start of the Dusi Canoe Marathon, as well as the Dusi Canoe Marathon itself. His philanthropic endeavors have raised approximately R54 820,00 which equals to roughly $300,000. Doners to The Princess Charlene Foundation can be quoted, praising Parkin for his unshakable resolve as he raised money by participating in physically grueling challenges for the sake of the deaf community that he represents.

As of August 2024, Terrence Parkin was inducted into the Princess Charlene Foundation's Hall of fame due to his various philanthropic endeavors. Parkin also donated one of his Olympic silver medals to the hall of fame.

== Records and statistics ==
=== Holds the Deaf World Record ===
50m Swimming Pool

- 200m breaststroke (2:12.50)
- 200m Individual Medley (2:03.33)
- 400m Individual Medley (4:16.92)

25m Swimming Pool

- 400m Freestyle (3:55.68)
- 800m Freestyle (8:07.36)
- 100m Backstroke (58.31)
- 200m Backstroke (2:02.83)
- 200m Breaststroke (2:08.91)
- 200m Medley (1:58.64)
- 400m Medley (4:10.39)

Other significant stats (not new world records)

- 100m Freestyle (50.77) 21 Nov 2009
- 1500m Freestyle (15:22.28) 17 Oct 2009
- 200m Backstroke (2:00.60) 6 Dec 2003
- 200m Breaststroke (2:07.91) 19 Mar 2000
- 50m Butterfly (25.14) 21 Nov 2009
- 200m Medley (1:57.87) 2 Feb 2000

=== Holds the Deaflympice Record ===
50m Swimming Pool

- 100m breaststroke (1:03.51) 2009
- 200m breaststroke (2:16.32) 2009

=== Terence Parkin Best Time for Short Course (25 m) https://www.fina.org/athletes/1013888/terence-parkin ===
Event	Time	Name	Date	Meet	Location	Ref
50m Freestyle	23.65	Terence Parkin	17 October 2009	FINA/Arena Swimming World Cup 2009	Durban, South Africa	
100m Freestyle	50.77	Terence Parkin	21 November 2009	FINA/Arena Swimming World Cup 2009	Singapore, Singapore	
200m Freestyle	1:49.94	Terence Parkin	22 November 2009	FINA/Arena Swimming World Cup 2009	Singapore, Singapore	
400m Freestyle	3:55.68	Terence Parkin	25 September 2009	Seagulls SC Championships 2009	Durban, South Africa	
800m Freestyle	8:04.68	Terence Parkin	17 October 2009	FINA/Arena Swimming World Cup 2009	Durban, South Africa	
1500m Freestyle	15:22.28	Terence Parkin	17 October 2009	FINA/Arena Swimming World Cup 2009	Durban, South Africa	
50m Backstroke	26.91	Terence Parkin	17 October 2009	FINA/Arena Swimming World Cup 2009	Durban, South Africa	
100m Backstroke	58.11	Terence Parkin	2 October 2003	Seagulls Winter SC Championships 2003	Durban, South Africa	
200m Backstroke	2:00.60	Terence Parkin	6 December 2003	FINA Swimming World Cup 2003	Durban, South Africa	
50m Breaststroke	28.38	Terence Parkin	5 December 2003	FINA Swimming World Cup 2003	Durban, South Africa	
100m Breaststroke	1:00.56	Terence Parkin	22 November 2009	FINA/Arena Swimming World Cup 2009	Singapore, Singapore	
200m Breaststroke	2:07.91	Terence Parkin	19 March 2000	5th FINA World Swimming Championships 2000	Athens, Greece	
50m Butterfly	25.14	Terence Parkin	21 November 2009	FINA/Arena Swimming World Cup 2009	Singapore, Singapore	
100m Butterfly	55.48	Terence Parkin	17 October 2009	FINA/Arena Swimming World Cup 2009	Durban, South Africa	
200m Butterfly	2:02.08	Terence Parkin	5 December 2003	FINA Swimming World Cup 2003	Durban, South Africa	
100m Medley	57.11	Terence Parkin	4 December 2003	FINA Swimming World Cup 2003	Durban, South Africa	
200m Medley	1:57.87	Terence Parkin	2 February 2000	FINA Swimming World Cup 2000	Sheffield, Great Britain	
400m Medley	4:10.39	Terence Parkin	26 January 2002	FINA Swimming World Cup 2002	Berlin, Germany	

== Olympics & Deaflympics results ==
2000 Olympics
16 Sep 2000	H	Men's 4×100 metre freestyle relay	3:21.28	11th		AR
16 Sep 2000	H	Men's 100 metre breaststroke	1:03.11	28th	DWR	
17 Sept 2000	H	Men's 400 metre individual medley	4:18.14	8th	DWR	AR
17 Sep 2000	F	Men's 400 metre individual medley	4:16.92	5th	DWR	AR
19 Sep 2000	H	Men's 200 metre breaststroke	2:15.06	10th	DWR	
19 Sep 2000	SF	Men's 200 metre breaststroke	2:13.57	6th	DWR	
20 Sep 2000	H	Men's 200 metre individual medley	2:03.33	16th	DWR	
20 Sep 2000	F	Men's 200 metre breaststroke	2:12.50	2nd place, silver medalist(s)	List of deaf world records in swimmingDWR	AR
(DWR – Deaf World Record) (AF- African Records) (Finals – F) (Heat – H) (Semifinal – SF)
2004 Olympics
14 Aug 2004	H	Men's 100 metre breaststroke	1:03.05	24th	DWR	
17 Aug 2004	H	Men's 200 metre breaststroke	2:14.12	12th		
17 Aug 2004	SF	Men's 200 metre breaststroke	2:13.58	7th		
20 Aug 2004	H	Men's 4×100 metre medley relay	3:43.94	13th		
(DWR – Deaf World Record) (Finals – F) (Heat – H) (Semifinal – SF)
1997 Deaflympics
15 Jul 1997		Men's 200 metre Freestyle	1:56.06	1st place, gold medalist(s)	GR	DWR
15 Jul 1997		Men's 100 metre Breaststroke	1:05.51	1st place, gold medalist(s)	GR	DWR
16 Jul 1997		Men's 400 metre Individual Medley	4:35.86	1st place, gold medalist(s)	GR	DWR
17 Jul 1997		Men's 200 metre Backstroke	2:13.93	2nd place, silver medalist(s)		
18 Jul 1997		Men's 100 metre Freestyle	54.00	4th		
18 Jul 1997		Men's 200 metre Breaststroke	2:21.55	1st place, gold medalist(s)	GR	DWR
19 Jul 1997		Men's 100 metre Backstroke	1:01.96	2nd place, silver medalist(s)		
19 Jul 1997		Men's 50 metre Freestyle	24.93	4th		
20 Jul 1997		Men's 200 metre Individual Medley	2:09.61	1st place, gold medalist(s)	GR	DWR
(DWR – Deaf World Record) (GR – Deaflympics Record)
2001 Deaflympics
25 Jul 2001		Men's 200 metre Freestyle	1:54.21	1st place, gold medalist(s)	GR	DWR
25 Jul 2001		Men's 100 metre Breaststroke	1:05.13	1st place, gold medalist(s)	GR	
26 Jul 2001		Men's 400 metre Individual Medley	4:29.99	1st place, gold medalist(s)	GR	
26 Jul 2001		Men's 4×100 metre Freestyle Relay	3:51.88	4th		
28 Jul 2001		Men's 100 metre Freestyle	52.91	1st place, gold medalist(s)	GR	
28 Jul 2001		Men's 200 metre Breaststroke	2:20.65	1st place, gold medalist(s)	GR	
(DWR – Deaf World Record) (GR – Deaflympics Record)
2005 Deaflympics
8 Jan 2005		Men's 50 metre Breaststroke	29.36	1st place, gold medalist(s)	GR	DWR
8 Jan 2005		Men's 400 metre Freestyle	4:07.46	1st place, gold medalist(s)	GR	
9 Jan 2005		Men's 4×200 metre Freestyle Relay	8:03.03	1st place, gold medalist(s)	GR	DWR
9 Jan 2005		Men's 200 metre Individual Medley	2:11.46	1st place, gold medalist(s)		
10 Jan 2005		Men's 200 metre Breaststroke	2:27.37	1st place, gold medalist(s)		
10 Jan 2005		Men's 100 metre Freestyle	52.47	1st place, gold medalist(s)	GR	
12 Jan 2005		Men's 200 metre Freestyle	1:53.70	1st place, gold medalist(s)	GR	DWR
12 Jan 2005		Men's 4×100 metre Medley Relay	4:04.85	1st place, gold medalist(s)	GR	DWR
12 Jan 2005		Men's 400 metre Individual Medley	4:40.62	1st place, gold medalist(s)		
13 Jan 2005		Men's 200 metre Butterfly	2:05.23	1st place, gold medalist(s)	GR	DWR
14 Jan 2005		Men's 1500 metre Freestyle	16:20.60	1st place, gold medalist(s)	GR	DWR
14 Jan 2005		Men's 100 metre Breaststroke	1:04.87	1st place, gold medalist(s)	GR	
14 Jan 2005		Men's 4×100 metre Freestyle Relay	3:40.95	2nd place, silver medalist(s)		
(DWR – Deaf World Record) (GR – Deaflympics Record)
2009 Deaflympics
7 Sep 2009		Men's 50 metre Breaststroke	29.58	1st place, gold medalist(s)		
8 Sep 2009		Men's 200 metre Breaststroke	2:16.32	1st place, gold medalist(s)	GR	
9 Sep 2009		Men's 400 metre Individual Medley	4:29.56	1st place, gold medalist(s)	GR	
10 Sep 2009		Cycling Road individual Race 100km	2h17m41s	3rd place, bronze medalist(s)		
11 Sep 2009		Men's 100 metre Breaststroke	1:03.51	1st place, gold medalist(s)	GR	
11 Sep 2009		Men's 200 metre Freestyle	1:53.12	1st place, gold medalist(s)	GR	DWR
12 Sep 2009		Men's 200 metre Individual Medley	2:06.24	1st place, gold medalist(s)	GR	
13 Sep 2009		Men's 1500 metre Freestyle	16:08.56	1st place, gold medalist(s)	GR	DWR
(DWR – Deaf World Record) (GR – Deaflympics Record)
2013 Deaflympics (Cycling)
27 Jul 2013		1000m Sprint	13.94	33rd		
29 Jul 2013		38 km Individual Time Trial	57m06s	9th		
1 Aug 2013		22 km Cross-country	1h47m00s	14th		
31 Jul 2013		96 km Road Race	2h32m35s	19th		

Meet	Medals
1997 Summer Deaflympics	1st place, gold medalist(s) 2nd place, silver medalist(s)
1999 Pan Pacific Championships	3rd place, bronze medalist(s)
1999 All-Africa Games	1st place, gold medalist(s) 2nd place, silver medalist(s) 3rd place, bronze medalist(s)
2000 FINA Short Course World Championships	2nd place, silver medalist(s)
2000 FINA Swimming World Cup	1st place, gold medalist(s) 2nd place, silver medalist(s)
2000 Summer Olympics	2nd place, silver medalist(s)
2001 Summer Deaflympics	1st place, gold medalist(s)
2001 Goodwill Games	1st place, gold medalist(s)
2001 FINA Swimming World Cup	2nd place, silver medalist(s) 3rd place, bronze medalist(s)
2002 Commonwealth Games	2nd place, silver medalist(s)
2002 FINA Swimming World Cup	1st place, gold medalist(s) 3rd place, bronze medalist(s)
2003 FINA Swimming World Cup	1st place, gold medalist(s) 2nd place, silver medalist(s)
2003 FINA Swimming World Cup	1st place, gold medalist(s) 2nd place, silver medalist(s)
2005 Summer Deaflympics	1st place, gold medalist(s) 2nd place, silver medalist(s)
2005 FINA Swimming World Cup	2nd place, silver medalist(s)
World Deaf Cycling Championships	1st place, gold medalist(s) 2nd place, silver medalist(s)
2008 Tour de Formosa Cycling Road	1st place, gold medalist(s) 2nd place, silver medalist(s) 3rd place, bronze medalist(s)
2009 Summer Deaflympics	1st place, gold medalist(s) 3rd place, bronze medalist(s)
2009 FINA Swimming World Cup	3rd place, bronze medalist(s)

== See also ==
- Deaf people in the Olympics
- List of Commonwealth Games medalists in swimming (men)
- List of Olympic medalists in swimming (men)
