= Fiji at the Deaflympics =

- IPC code: FIJ
- NPC: Deaf Sports Association of Fiji
- Website: www.facebook.com/pages/Deaf-Sports-Association-of-Fiji/440354869381782
- Medals: Gold 0 Silver 0 Bronze 0 Total 0

Summer appearances
- 2005; 2009; 2013; 2017; 2021

Fiji has been participating at the Deaflympics since 2005.

Fiji has competed at the Summer Deaflympics on three occasions in 2005, 2009 and 2013.

== Medal tallies ==
=== Summer Deaflympics ===
Event	Gold	Silver	Bronze	Total
2005	0	0	0	0
2009	0	0	0	0
2013	0	0	0	0

== Athletes in the Summer Deaflympics ==
- 2005: Apenisa Matairavula, Makarita Miriama, Mesake Qionilase, Venaslo Tamanai, (Athletics), Wani Baniakau, Serupepeli Bukatavo, Michael Din, Mosese Kama, Apenisa Matairavula, Senetiki Nasave, Sireli Naserua, Alipate Qio, Serevi Rokotuibau, Josefa Sokovagone, Jone Temo, Epeli Vualili, Jeremaia Vueti (Volleyball)
- 2009: Koronawa Gukibau, Mosese Kama, Manasa Narita, Rupeni Naulumatua, Napoleon Ratu, Josefa Sokovagone, Epeli Vualili (Volleyball)
- 2013: Ratu Raravisa (Athletics), Vivienne Bale, Philip Wing (Table Tennis)

== See also ==
- Fiji at the Olympics
- Fiji at the Paralympics
