= Ibara (disambiguation) =

Ibara is a city in Okayama, Japan.

Ibara may also refer to:

== People ==
- Franchel Ibara (born 1989), Congolese soccer player
- Lucien Fils Ibara (born 1973), Congolese soccer player
- Prince Ibara (born 1996), Congolese soccer player
- Ibara Ryutaro, a competition record holder in deaf swimming; see List of World Deaf Swimming Championships records
- Ibara Saikaku (1642–1693), Japanese poet

=== Fictional characters ===
- Ibara, a fictional government minister from Dr. Stone; see List of Dr. Stone characters
- Ibara, a fictional character from Shikizakura
- Ibara-hime (Princess Ibara), a fictional character from Otogi-Jūshi Akazukin
- Ibara Junko, a fictional character from Megatokyo
- Ibara Mayaka, a fictional character from Hyouka: Forbidden Secrets
- Ibara Naruse, a fictional character from Coppelion
- Ibara Obami, a fictional character from Kakegurui; see List of Kakegurui – Compulsive Gambler characters
- Ibara Rinne, a fictional character from Pretty Rhythm: Rainbow Live; see List of Pretty Rhythm: Rainbow Live characters
- Ibara Shiozaki (塩崎 茨), a fictional character from My Hero Academia
- Ibara Saegusa (七 種茨), a fictional character from Ensemble Stars!.

== Places ==
- Ibara, Okrika, Rivers, Nigeria; a village, see List of villages in Rivers State
- Ibara, Sashiki, Nanjō, Okinawa, Japan; a neighbourhood
- Ibara Line, Japanese rail line
- Ibara Station, Ibara, Okayama, Japan; a train station

=== Fictional locations ===
- Ibara, an island outpost on the planet Veelox; a fictional location found in Pendragon: Journal of an Adventure through Time and Space

== Other uses ==
- Ibara (arcade game), a 2005 arcade game title
- Ibara Railway, a Japanese railway company

== See also ==
- H. ibara, a species of butterfly
- Ibarra, Ecuador
