= Tamara Foronda =

American volleyball player

Tamara Johanna Foronda
Personal information
- Nationality: American
- Born: September 25, 1984 (age 41) California, U.S.
- Education: Gallaudet University
- Occupation: Volleyball player

Sport
- Sport: Handball, Volleyball, Beach Volleyball
Medal record
Representing United States
Deaflympics
Silver medal – second place	Rome 2001	handball
Silver medal – second place	Taipei 2009	volleyball
Bronze medal – third place	Melbourne 2005	beach volleyball

Tamara Johanna Foronda (born September 25, 1984), often known as Tamara J. Foronda, is an American volleyball player who has also played beach volleyball and handball in addition to her sports career. She has represented United States at the Deaflympics on three occasions in three different sporting events. She graduated from the Gallaudet University.

== Career ==
Foronda competed at the 2001 Summer Deaflympics in the women's handball competition as a handball player. She was also a member of the US deaf handball team that won the silver medal in the 2001 Summer Deaflympics.

She went on to participate at the 2005 Summer Deaflympics as a beach volleyball player and was also part of the US deaf beach volleyball team, which won the bronze medal during the multi-sport event. In 2005, she was recognized as a recipient of the Widex Athlete of the Year Award for her sportsmanship and fair play at the 2005 Summer Deaflympics. Foronda also received a cash prize of US$5000 as the fair play award from WIDEX. She was nominated as a finalist for the 2005 Deaf Sportswoman of the Year, earning 18 points in the women's category. Notably, an article featuring a photo of her shooting action at the 2005 Summer Deaflympics was published in the May 2005 issue of Volleyball Magazine. Foronda also won the USA Deaf Sports Federation's Sportswoman of the Year award in 2005.

Foronda participated in her last Summer Deaflympic event in 2009 as a volleyball player and was a key member of the US deaf volleyball team that won the silver medal in the competition.
