= Linda Neumann =

German swimmer

Personal information
- Full name: Linda Elisa Neumann
- Nationality: Germany
- Born: March 17, 1993 (age 33)

Sport
- Sport: Swimming
Medal record
Representing Germany
Women's Swimming
Deaflympics
Silver medal – second place	Sofia 2013	400m freestyle
Bronze medal – third place	Sofia 2013	400m individual medley

Linda Elisa Neumann (born 17 March 1993) is a German deaf swimmer. She competed at the Deaflympics in 2009, 2013 and 2017 representing Germany. She currently holds the German deaf swimming record for the women's 400m freestyle event, which she set in 2014.

Neumann has won 2 medals in her Deaflympic career including a silver medal in the women's 400m freestyle event and a bronze medal in the women's 400m individual medley event as a part of the 2013 Summer Deaflympics.
