= List of World Deaf Swimming Championships records =

The World Deaf Championships records in swimming are the fastest ever performances of deaf athletes swum at any edition of the meet, which are recognised and ratified by the Comité International des Sports des Sourds and FINA.

All times are swum in a long-course (50m) pool. All records were set in finals unless noted otherwise.

== Men ==
Event	Time		Name	Nationality	Date	Meet	Location	Ref
50m freestyle	23.19		Illia Sultanov	Ukraine	19 August 2023	6th World Deaf Championships	Buenos Aires, Argentina	
100m freestyle	51.42	r, DWR	Marcus Titus	United States	9 August 2011	3rd World Deaf Championships	Coimbra, Portugal	
200m freestyle	1:53.40		Luca Germano	Italy	7 August 2011	3rd World Deaf Championships	Coimbra, Portugal	
400m freestyle	4:03.09		Luca Germano	Italy	13 August 2011	3rd World Deaf Championships	Coimbra, Portugal	
800m freestyle	8:27.85		Federico Tamborrino	Italy	17 August 2023	6th World Deaf Championships	Buenos Aires, Argentina	
1500m freestyle	16:08.92		Satoi Fujihara	Japan	31 August 2019	5th World Deaf Championships	São Paulo, Brazil	
50m backstroke	26.80		Lars Kochmann	Germany	26 August 2019	5th World Deaf Championships	São Paulo, Brazil	
100m backstroke	57.85		Lars Kochmann	Germany	28 August 2019	5th World Deaf Championships	São Paulo, Brazil	
200m backstroke	2:06.11		Vladyslav Kremliakov	Ukraine	15 August 2023	6th World Deaf Championships	Buenos Aires, Argentina	
50m breaststroke	27.79	DWR	Marcus Titus	United States	7 August 2011	3rd World Deaf Championships	Coimbra, Portugal	
100m breaststroke	1:00.59		Marcus Titus	United States	18 August 2015	4th World Deaf Championships	San Antonio, United States	
200m breaststroke	2:16.77		Marcus Titus	United States	8 August 2011	3rd World Deaf Championships	Coimbra, Portugal	
50m butterfly	25.17		Marcus Titus	United States	9 August 2011	3rd World Deaf Championships	Coimbra, Portugal	
100m butterfly	55.62		Ibara Ryutaro	Japan	18 August 2023	6th World Deaf Championships	Buenos Aires, Argentina	
200m butterfly	2:01.71	DWR	Luca Germano	Italy	8 August 2011	3rd World Deaf Championships	Coimbra, Portugal	
200m individual medley	2:05.40		Ibara Ryutaro	Japan	30 August 2019	5th World Deaf Championships	São Paulo, Brazil	
400m individual medley	4:30.04		Ibara Ryutaro	Japan	26 August 2019	5th World Deaf Championships	São Paulo, Brazil	
4×100m freestyle relay	3:28.63		Andrey Zhivaev; Ilyh Sarykin; Vitalii Obotin; Miron Denison	Russia	31 August 2019	5th World Deaf Championships	São Paulo, Brazil	
4×200m freestyle relay	7:42.91		Miron Denisov; Vitalii Obotin; Andrey Zhivaev; Filipp Torishnii	Russia	29 August 2019	5th World Deaf Championships	São Paulo, Brazil	
4×100m medley relay	3:50.90		Igor Zhuravlev; Martin Fomin; Ilya Sarykin; Miron Denisov	Russia	27 August 2019	5th World Deaf Championships	São Paulo, Brazil	

Legend: # – Record awaiting ratification by FINA; WR – World record;
Records not set in finals: h – heat; sf – semifinal; r – relay 1st leg; rh – relay heat 1st leg; b – B final; † – en route to final mark; tt – time trial

== Women ==
Event	Time		Name	Nationality	Date	Meet	Location	Ref
50m freestyle	26.29		Olga Kliuchnikova	Russia	27 August 2019	5th World Deaf Championships	São Paulo, Brazil	
100m freestyle	58.05		Ganna Lytvynenko	Ukraine	15 August 2007	2nd World Deaf Championships	Chinese Taipei	
200m freestyle	2:08.25		Carli Cronk	United States	19 August 2023	6th World Deaf Championships	Buenos Aires, Argentina	
400m freestyle	4:31.16		Carli Cronk	United States	14 August 2023	6th World Deaf Championships	Buenos Aires, Argentina	
800m freestyle	9:16.22		Rebecca Meyers	United States	11 August 2011	3rd World Deaf Championships	Coimbra, Portugal	
1500m freestyle	18:02.70		Carli Cronk	United States	16 August 2023	6th World Deaf Championships	Buenos Aires, Argentina	
50m backstroke	29.71		Olga Kliuchnikova	Russia	29 August 2019	5th World Deaf Championships	São Paulo, Brazil	
100m backstroke	1:04.93		Olga Kliuchnikova	Russia	31 August 2019	5th World Deaf Championships	São Paulo, Brazil	
200m backstroke	2:19.80		Olga Kliuchnikova	Russia	27 August 2019	5th World Deaf Championships	São Paulo, Brazil	
50m breaststroke	31.97	DWR	Mariia Rezhylo	Ukraine	28 August 2019	5th World Deaf Championships	São Paulo, Brazil	
100m breaststroke	1:11.53	DWR	Aksana Petrushenka	Belarus	20 August 2015	4th World Deaf Championships	San Antonio, United States	
200m breaststroke	2:35.65	DWR	Aksana Petrushenka	Belarus	8 August 2011	3rd World Deaf Championships	Coimbra, Portugal	
50m butterfly	27.48	DWR	Olga Kliuchnikova	Russia	26 August 2019	5th World Deaf Championships	São Paulo, Brazil	
100m butterfly	1:02.28		Carli Cronk	United States	14 August 2023	6th World Deaf Championships	Buenos Aires, Argentina	
200m butterfly	2:19.57		Carli Cronk	United States	17 August 2023	6th World Deaf Championships	Buenos Aires, Argentina	
200m individual medley	2:22.78		Aksana Petrushenka	Belarus	11 August 2011	3rd World Deaf Championships	Coimbra, Portugal	
400m individual medley	5:00.96	DWR	Polina Bilalova	Russia	29 August 2019	5th World Deaf Championships	São Paulo, Brazil	
4×100m freestyle relay	4:01.90		Anna Tovsta (1:01.51); Valeriia Sytnikova (59.93); Iryna Tereshchenko (1:01.01); Ganna Lytvynenko (59.45)	Ukraine	9 August 2011	3rd World Deaf Championships	Coimbra, Portugal	
4×200m freestyle relay	8:49.55		Peggy Liang (2:11.29); Kristin Ates (2:13.68); Samantha Elam (2:12.85); Rebecca Meyers (2:11.73)	United States	12 August 2011	3rd World Deaf Championships	Coimbra, Portugal	
4×100m medley relay	4:25.84		Olga Kliuchnikova; Kristina Shaniakhmetova; Polina Bilalova; Viktoria Terenteva	Russia	30 August 2019	5th World Deaf Championships	São Paulo, Brazil	

Legend: # – Record awaiting ratification by FINA; WR – World record;
Records not set in finals: h – heat; sf – semifinal; r – relay 1st leg; rh – relay heat 1st leg; b – B final; † – en route to final mark; tt – time trial

== Mixed Relay ==
Event	Time	Name	Nationality	Date	Meet	Location	Ref
4×100m freestyle relay	3:42.89	Vitalii Obotin; Mark Troshin; Maria Karpova; Olga Kluchnikova	Russia	28 August 2019	5th World Deaf Championships	São Paulo, Brazil	
4×100m medley relay	4:09.97	Igor Zhuravlev; Martin Fomin; Polina Bilalova; Victoria Terenteva	Russia	31 August 2019	5th World Deaf Championships	São Paulo, Brazil	

Legend: # – Record awaiting ratification by CISS, FINA;
Records not set in finals: h – heat
