= Ganna Lytvynenko =

Ukrainian swimmer (born 1970)

Hanna Lytvynenko
Personal information
- Full name: Hanna Ivanivna Lytvynenko
- National team: Ukraine
- Born: 22 December 1970 (age 55) Kiev, Ukrainian SSR, Soviet Union (now - Kyiv, Ukraine)

Sport
- Sport: Swimming
- Strokes: Freestyle
Medal record
Event	1st	2nd	3rd
Deaflympics	10	8	2
World Championships	4	2	2
European Championships	11	1	1
Total	25	11	5
Women's deaf swimming
Representing Ukraine
Deaflympics
Gold medal – first place	2001 Rome	50 m freestyle
Gold medal – first place	2001 Rome	100 m freestyle
Gold medal – first place	2001 Rome	200 m freestyle
Gold medal – first place	2005 Melbourne	50 m freestyle
Gold medal – first place	2005 Melbourne	100 m freestyle
Gold medal – first place	2005 Melbourne	200 m freestyle
Gold medal – first place	2009 Taipei	50 m freestyle
Gold medal – first place	2009 Taipei	100 m freestyle
Gold medal – first place	2009 Taipei	4 x 100 m freestyle relay
Gold medal – first place	2013 Sofia	100 m freestyle
Silver medal – second place	1993 Sofia	50 m freestyle
Silver medal – second place	1997 Copenhagen	100 m freestyle
Silver medal – second place	2001 Rome	100 m butterfly
Silver medal – second place	2009 Taipei	200 m freestyle
Silver medal – second place	2009 Taipei	4 x 200 m freestyle relay
Silver medal – second place	2013 Sofia	50 m freestyle
Silver medal – second place	2013 Sofia	4 x 100 m medley relay
Silver medal – second place	2013 Sofia	4 x 200 m freestyle relay
Bronze medal – third place	2009 Taipei	4 x 100 m medley relay
Bronze medal – third place	2013 Sofia	4 x 100 m freestyle relay
World Championships
Gold medal – first place	2007 Taipei	50 m freestyle
Gold medal – first place	2007 Taipei	100 m freestyle
Gold medal – first place	2007 Taipei	200 m freestyle
Gold medal – first place	2011 Coimbra	4 x 100 m freestyle relay
Silver medal – second place	2007 Taipei	4 x 100 m medley relay
Silver medal – second place	2011 Coimbra	100 m freestyle
Silver medal – second place	2011 Coimbra	4 x 100 m medley relay
Silver medal – second place	2011 Coimbra	4 x 200 m freestyle relay
Bronze medal – third place	2007 Taipei	4 x 100 m freestyle relay
Bronze medal – third place	2007 Taipei	4 x 200 m freestyle relay
European Championships
Gold medal – first place	1994 Budapest	50 m freestyle
Gold medal – first place	2002 Amsterdam	50 m freestyle
Gold medal – first place	2002 Amsterdam	100 m freestyle
Gold medal – first place	2006 Thessaloniki	50 m freestyle
Gold medal – first place	2006 Thessaloniki	100 m freestyle
Gold medal – first place	2006 Thessaloniki	200 m freestyle
Gold medal – first place	2010 Dortmund	50 m freestyle
Gold medal – first place	2010 Dortmund	100 m freestyle
Gold medal – first place	2010 Dortmund	4 x 100 m freestyle relay
Gold medal – first place	2010 Dortmund	4 x 200 m freestyle relay
Gold medal – first place	2010 Dortmund	4 x 100 m medley relay
Silver medal – second place	1994 Budapest	100 m freestyle
Bronze medal – third place	2002 Amsterdam	400 m freestyle

Hanna Ivanivna Lytvynenko (Ukrainian: Ганна Іванівна Литвиненко, also known as Ganna Lytvynenko, born 22 December 1970) is a Ukrainian deaf swimmer. She is 2002 and 2007 WIDEX Sportswoman of the Year finalist.

== Career ==
Lytvynenko began to swim in the age of 9 and debuted her professional career in the age of 11.

In 1980, Lytvynenko won a gold medal at the Ukrainian SSR deaf swimming championships. Three years later, she won a Soviet Union deaf swimming championships.

Since 1993, Lytvynenko was a member of Ukrainian national team. In that year, she made her Deaflympic debut in the 1993 Summer Deaflympics which was held in Sofia, where she claimed a silver medal in 50 metres freestyle.

In 1994, at the European Deaf Swimming Championships in Budapest Lytvynenko received a gold medal in 50 metres freestyle and a silver one in 100 metres freestyle.

In 1997, at the Summer Deaflympics in Copenhagen, Lytvynenko won a second silver medal in 100 metres freestyle. She also broke a world deaf record in 50 metres freestyle (28.05 seconds).

Four years later, at the 2001 Summer Deaflympics in Rome Lytvynenko received three gold medals in 50, 100 and 200 metres freestyle and a silver one in 100 metres butterfly. She again broke two world deaf records in 50 metres freestyle (28.02 and 27.78 seconds).

In 2002, Lytvynenko competed at the European Deaf Swimming Championships in Amsterdam, winning two gold medals in 50 and 100 metres freestyle and a bronze one in 400 metres freestyle. In that year, she was a WIDEX Sportswoman of the Year finalist.

At the 2005 Summer Deaflympics in Melbourne Lytvynenko she repeated her achievement of the previous Summer Deaflympics, winning three gold medals in 50, 100 and 200 metres freestyle. She also broke two world deaf records in 50 metres (27.39 seconds) and 100 metres (59.29 seconds) freestyle.

At the 2006 European Deaf Swimming Championships in Thessaloniki Lytvynenko received three gold medals in 50, 100 and 200 metres freestyle with a new world deaf record in 100 metres freestyle (58.90 seconds).

In 2007, Lytvynenko made her debut at the World Deaf Swimming Championships in Taipei, where she won three gold medals in 50, 100 and 200 metres freestyle, a silver one in 4 x 100 metres medley relay and bronze ones in 4 x 100 and 4 x 200 metres relay. At these World Championships she broke a new world deaf record in 100 metres freestyle (58.05 seconds). In that year, she was a WIDEX Sportswoman of the Year finalist.

Two years later, Lytvynenko competed at the 2009 Summer Deaflympics, where she won three gold medals in 50, 100 metres freestyle and 4 x 100 freestyle relay, two silver ones in 200 metres freestyle and 4 x 200 metres freestyle relay and a bronze one in 4 x 100 medley relay. She also broke three world deaf records in 50 metres (26.79 and 26.15 seconds) and 100 metres (57.29 seconds) freestyle.

In 2010, she competed at the European Deaf Swimming Championships in Dortmund, winning five gold medals in 50, 100 and 200 metres freestyle, 4 x 200 metres freestyle relay and 4 x 100 metres medley relay.

The following year, Lytvynenko won a gold medal in 4 x 100 metres freestyle relay and three silver ones in 100 metres freestyle, 4 x 200 metres freestyle relay and 4 x 100 medley relay at the World Deaf Swimming Championships in Coimbra.

At the 2013 Summer Deaflympics Lytvynenko won a gold medal in 100 metres freestyle, three silver ones in 50 metres freestyle, 4 x 100 medley relay and 4 x 200 freestyle relay and a bronze one in 4 x 100 freestyle relay.

After her last Deaflympics in 2013 she finished her swimming career. Lytvynenko is currently a swimming coach at the youth sports school "Chance".
