= Aksana Petrushenka =

Belarusian swimmer

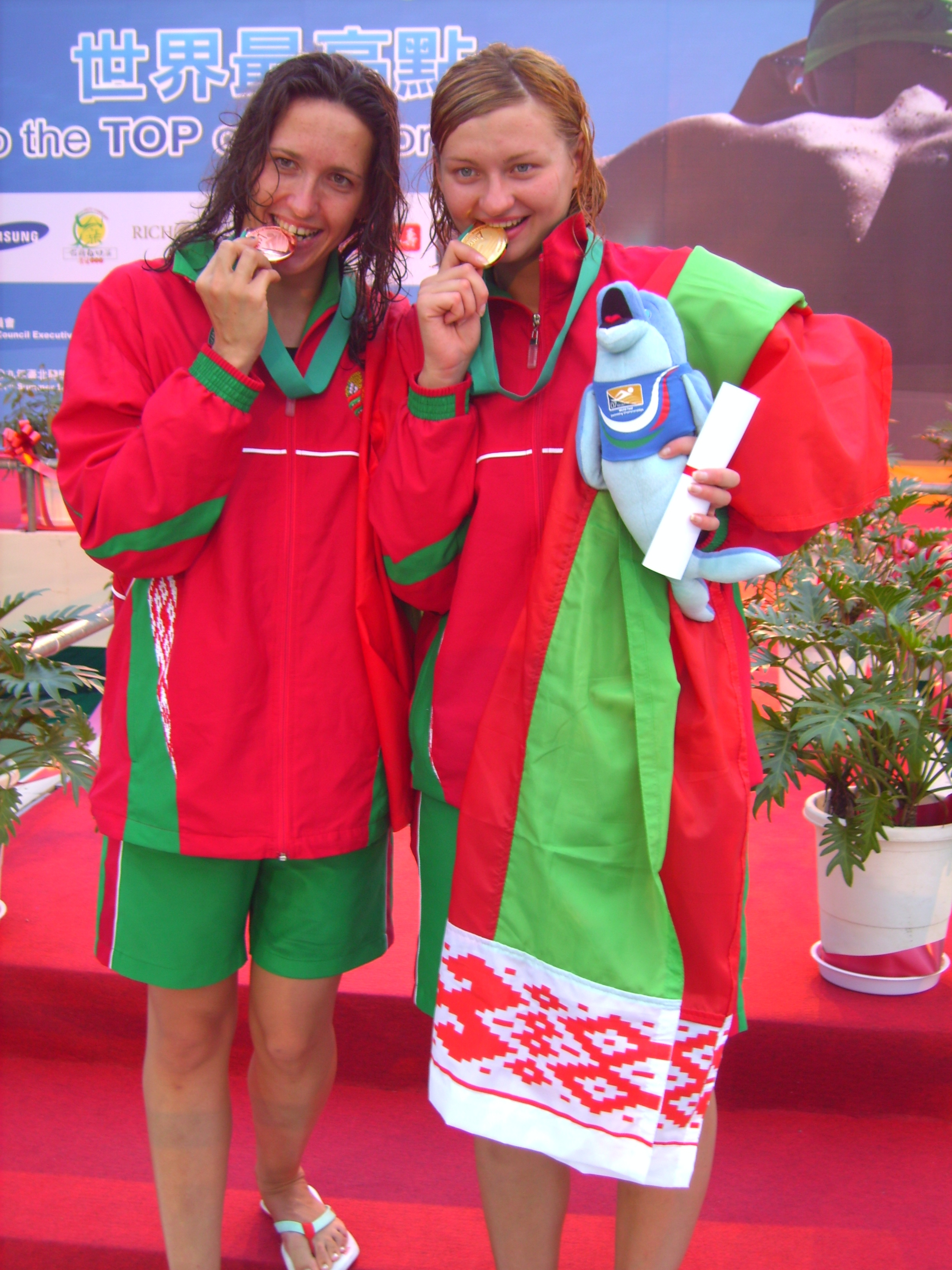
- Aksana Petrushenka (right) along with fellow Belarusian swimmer Natalia Deeva (left) posing with gold medals during the 2007 World Deaf Swimming Championships Award Ceremony of Women's 200 Breaststroke event

Personal information
- Nationality: Belarus
- Born: September 25, 1984 (age 42)

Sport
- Sport: Swimming
Medal record
Representing Belarus
Women's Swimming
Event / 1st / 2nd / 3rd; Deaflympics / 14 / 8 / 6
Deaflympics
| Gold medal – first place | Melbourne 2005 | 200m individual medley |
| Gold medal – first place | Taipei 2009 | 100m breaststroke |
| Gold medal – first place | Taipei 2009 | 200m breaststroke |
| Gold medal – first place | Taipei 2009 | 200m individual medley |
| Gold medal – first place | Taipei 2009 | 4x100m medley relay |
| Gold medal – first place | Sofia 2013 | 50m breaststroke |
| Gold medal – first place | Sofia 2013 | 4x100m freestyle relay |
| Gold medal – first place | Sofia 2013 | 50m freestyle |
| Gold medal – first place | Sofia 2013 | 200m breaststroke |
| Gold medal – first place | Sofia 2013 | 200m medley relay |
| Gold medal – first place | Sofia 2013 | 4x100m medley relay |
| Gold medal – first place | Samsun 2017 | 100m breaststroke |
| Gold medal – first place | Samsun 2017 | 200m breaststroke |
| Gold medal – first place | Samsun 2017 | 50m breaststroke |
| Silver medal – second place | Melbourne 2005 | 100m freestyle |
| Silver medal – second place | Melbourne 2005 | 4x100m freestyle relay |
| Silver medal – second place | Melbourne 2005 | 50m breaststroke |
| Silver medal – second place | Melbourne 2005 | 100m breaststroke |
| Silver medal – second place | Sofia 2013 | 50m breaststroke |
| Silver medal – second place | Taipei 2009 | 50m freestyle |
| Silver medal – second place | Samsun 2017 | 4×100m freestyle relay |
| Silver medal – second place | Samsun 2017 | 4×100 medley relay |
| Bronze medal – third place | Rome 2001 | 4x100m freestyle relay |
| Bronze medal – third place | Melbourne 2005 | 4x100m medley relay |
| Bronze medal – third place | Melbourne 2005 | 4x200m freestyle relay |
| Bronze medal – third place | Melbourne 2005 | 200m freestyle |
| Bronze medal – third place | Melbourne 2005 | 200m breaststroke |
| Bronze medal – third place | Taipei 2009 | 4x100m freestyle relay |

Aksana Petrushenka also spelt as Oksana Petrushenka (born 25 September 1984) is a Belarusian deaf swimmer who is also a current world record holder among deaf swimmers in women's 100m and 200m breaststroke. She has represented Belarus at the Deaflympics in five occasions in 2001, 2005, 2009, 2013 and 2017. She is considered to be the second most decorated woman in Deaflympics history with a record haul of 28 medals, which is second highest among women in Deaflympics after Cindy-Lu Bailey.

== Career ==
She made her Deaflympic debut at the 2001 Summer Deaflympics and claimed her first Deaflympic medal in the same multi-sport event which was a bronze in the women's 4 × 100 m freestyle relay. She claimed her first Deaflympic gold medal at the 2005 Summer Deaflympics in the women's 200m individual medley.

She was awarded the ICSD Deaf Sportswoman of the Year Award in 2009 by the International Committee of Sports for the Deaf for her medal success at the 2009 Summer Deaflympics where she bagged six medals including four gold medals. On 8 August 2011, she set a new world record as well as World Deaf Championship record in women's 200m breaststroke among deaf during the World Deaf Swimming Championships.

She also received the EDSO Sportswoman of the Year award in 2013 from the European Deaf Sports Organisation mainly for her performances at the 2013 Summer Deaflympics where she clinched seven medals including six gold medals.

On 11 August 2015, she broke her own deaf world record in women's 100m breaststroke during the 2015 World Deaf Swimming Championships. She also claimed three gold medals in the 2017 Summer Deaflympics.
