= Matt Klotz =

American swimmer

Personal information
- National team: United States
- Born: May 24, 1996 (age 30) Cameron Park, California, U.S.
- Height: 6 ft 2 in (188 cm)

Sport
- Sport: Swimming
- College team: LSU Tigers
Medal record
Men's swimming
Representing United States
Deaflympics
Gold medal – first place	Sofia 2013	100m backstroke
Gold medal – first place	Sofia 2013	200m backstroke
Gold medal – first place	Samsun 2017	50m backstroke
Gold medal – first place	Samsun 2017	100m backstroke
Gold medal – first place	Samsun 2017	200m backstroke
Gold medal – first place	Caxias do Sul 2022	50m freestyle
Gold medal – first place	Caxias do Sul 2022	50m backstroke
Gold medal – first place	Caxias do Sul 2022	100m backstroke
Silver medal – second place	Samsun 2017	50m butterfly
Silver medal – second place	Samsun 2017	50m freestyle
Silver medal – second place	Caxias do Sul 2022	100m freestyle
Silver medal – second place	Caxias do Sul 2022	200m backstroke
Bronze medal – third place	Sofia 2013	400m individual medley
Bronze medal – third place	Caxias do Sul 2022	50m breaststroke
Bronze medal – third place	Caxias do Sul 2022	50m butterfly
Bronze medal – third place	Caxias do Sul 2022	100m butterfly
Bronze medal – third place	Caxias do Sul 2022	4x200m freestyle relay butterfly

Matthew James Klotz (born May 24, 1996) is an American male deaf swimmer and reality television contestant. He has represented the United States at the Deaflympics and in other international events including the Deaf World Championships. He is a world record holder in swimming for deaf and is considered one of the finest deaf swimmers to represent USA after the retirements of Marcus Titus and Reed Gershwind. He made his Deaflympic debut at the 2013 Summer Deaflympics.

He became runner-up in the 25th edition of the American reality show Big Brother after appearing in the show as one of the houseguests.

== Biography ==
It is believed that his parents were unaware that their son was deaf until the age of 2. He is considered to be deaf and uses hearing aids. He holds dual citizenship in both the US and Hungary. In 2018, he insisted that he wanted to represent Hungary at the 2020 Summer Olympics instead of United States. However, he was unable to change his sporting citizenship from the US to Hungary by the time the 2020 Summer Olympics happened.

== Career ==
He rose to fame during the 2013 Summer Deaflympics held in Bulgaria, where he claimed two gold medals in the men's 100m backstroke and 200m backstroke events, alongside a bronze medal in the men's 400m individual medley event. He continued his Deaflympic career success with a medal haul of five, including three gold medals in 50m backstroke, 100m backstroke, and 200m backstroke events during the 2017 Summer Deaflympics.

He notably shattered two deaf world records during the 2018 US National Swimming Championship, including his own previous record of 26.26 seconds in the men's 50m backstroke event from the 2017 Summer Deaflympics. He managed to re-establish his own world record in 50y backstroke with a timing of 19.77 seconds and became first ever deaf swimmer to swim 50y backstroke within 20 seconds. He also broke the deaf world record in the men's 50m freestyle event, clocking 23.14 seconds and surpassing Marcus Titus' record of 23.34 seconds. He is also a national record holder in 200m freestyle, 500m freestyle, 100m backstroke and in 200m backstroke categories.

In December 2018, was awarded the ICSD Deaf Sportsman of the Year by International Committee of Sports for the Deaf for his outstanding performances at deaf sporting events including the world records that he set in both 50m backstroke and 50m freestyle events. He competed at the 2019 ICSD World Deaf Swimming Championships which will be held in São Paulo, Brazil. He took part at the 2021 Summer Deaflympics and claimed a record medal tally of nine including three gold medals in men's 50m freestyle, men's 50m backstroke and men's 100m backstroke events. He also clinched silver medals at the 2021 Deaflympics in men's 100m freestyle and men's 200m backstroke events. Furthermore, he secured four bronze medals during the 2021 Deaflympics in men's 50m butterfly, men's 100m butterfly, men's 50m breaststroke and men's 4 200m freestyle relay events.

On July 31, 2023, it was announced that Klotz would appear on the 25th season of Big Brother and become the first deaf/hard of hearing contestant in the show's history. He would later go on to win second place. He strongly indicated his desire to represent Hungary at the 2024 Summer Olympics instead of representing his country of birth, the United States. However he failed to qualify for the 2024 Summer Olympics.
