= Carli Cronk =

American swimmer (born 2006)

Personal information
- Full name: Carli Elizabeth Cronk
- National team: United States
- Born: 2006 (age 19–20) United States

Sport
- Country: United States
- Sport: Swimming
Medal record
Women's swimming
Representing United States
Event / 1st / 2nd / 3rd; Deaflympics / 19 / 1 / 1
Deaflympics
| Gold medal – first place | Caxias Do Sul 2021 | 1500m freestyle |
| Gold medal – first place | Caxias Do Sul 2021 | 200m butterfly |
| Gold medal – first place | Caxias Do Sul 2021 | 200m freestyle |
| Gold medal – first place | Caxias Do Sul 2021 | 400m individual medley |
| Gold medal – first place | Caxias Do Sul 2021 | 200m backstroke |
| Gold medal – first place | Caxias Do Sul 2021 | 400m freestyle |
| Gold medal – first place | Caxias Do Sul 2021 | mixed relay |
| Gold medal – first place | Caxias Do Sul 2021 | 4 × 100m medley relay |
| Gold medal – first place | Tokyo 2025 | 200m freestyle |
| Gold medal – first place | Tokyo 2025 | 400m freestyle |
| Gold medal – first place | Tokyo 2025 | 100m butterfly |
| Gold medal – first place | Tokyo 2025 | 200m butterfly |
| Gold medal – first place | Tokyo 2025 | 400m medley |
| Gold medal – first place | Tokyo 2025 | 4 × 100m medley mixed relay |
| Gold medal – first place | Tokyo 2025 | 4 × 100m freestyle mixed relay |
| Silver medal – second place | Tokyo 2025 | 50m butterfly |
| Bronze medal – third place | Tokyo 2025 | 4 × 100m medley relay |

Carli Elizabeth Cronk (born 2006) is an American deaf swimmer. In May 2022, she set the world Deaflympic record for having won the most number of gold medals by an athlete in a single edition of the Summer Deaflympics with a haul of 12 gold medals. She secured gold medals in women's 1500m freestyle, women's 200m butterfly, women's 200m freestyle, women's 200m and 400m individual medley, women's 200m backstroke, women's 400m freestyle, women's 4 × 200 m free relay, women's and mixed 4 × 100m medley relay, women's and mixed 4 × 100 m free relay events.

== Biography ==
Cronk was born with deafness and she relies heavily on hearing aids and lip reading. She attended Churchill High School.

== Career ==
She took part at the 2019 World Deaf Swimming Championships and claimed a solitary silver and two bronze medals in the competition. In February 2022, she claimed bronze medal in the women's 200m freestyle at the University Interscholastic League Class 6A state championships.

She made her Deaflympic debut representing United States at the 2021 Summer Deaflympics (held in May 2022) at the age of 16 and was one of the cadres of the thirteen member swimming contingent to represent America at the 2021 Summer Deaflympics. She won record 12 gold medals in her maiden appearance at the Deaflympics eventually surpassing the American records held by Jeff Float and Laura Ann Barber for claiming the most number of gold medals at any Deaflympics. She also teamed up with fellow swimmers Matthew Klotz, Brooke Thompson and Collin Davis to secure gold in mixed free relay category.

During the 2021 Summer Deaflympics, she set three world records in deaf swimming for women. On May 4, 2022, she set the new world record in women's 1500m freestyle event by clocking 17:33.90 seconds. On May 5, 2022, she surpassed the world record in women's 200m butterfly event with a timing of 2:18.40 seconds. On May 7, 2022, she broke the world record in women's 400m individual medley event by clocking 4:58.53 seconds.
