= Viola Scotto di Carlo =

Italian swimmer (born 2003)

Viola Scotto Di Carlo
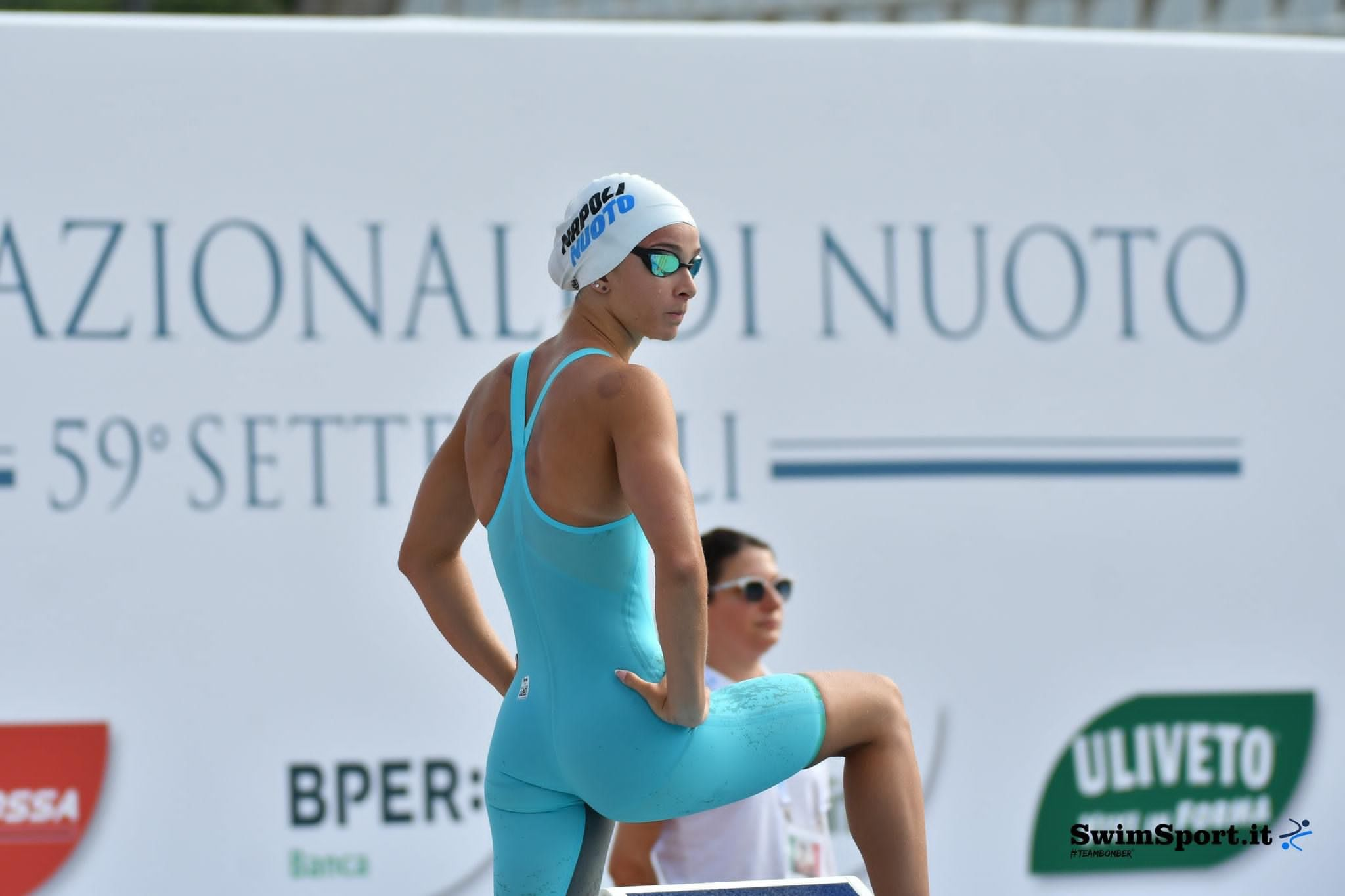

Personal information
- Nationality: Italian
- Born: 27 June 2003 (age 23)

Sport
- Sport: Swimming
Medal record
Women's swimming
Representing Italy
Mediterranean Games
Silver medal – second place	2022 Oran	50 m butterfly
Silver medal – second place	2026 Taranto	50 m butterfly
Bronze medal – third place	2022 Oran	4×100 m freestyle
World University Games
Silver medal – second place	2021 Chengdu	4×100 m freestyle
Bronze medal – third place	2021 Chengdu	50 m butterfly
Bronze medal – third place	2021 Chengdu	4×100 m medley
Bronze medal – third place	2021 Chengdu	4×100 m mixed medley
Bronze medal – third place	2025 Rhine-Ruhr	50 m butterfly
Bronze medal – third place	2025 Rhine-Ruhr	4×100 m freestyle
Bronze medal – third place	2025 Rhine-Ruhr	4×100 m medley
Deaflympics
Gold medal – first place	2025 Tokyo	50 m freestyle
Gold medal – first place	2025 Tokyo	50 m backstroke
Gold medal – first place	2025 Tokyo	50 m butterfly
Gold medal – first place	2025 Tokyo	4× 200 m freestyle
Silver medal – second place	2025 Tokyo	200 m freestyle
Silver medal – second place	2025 Tokyo	400 m freestyle
Silver medal – second place	2025 Tokyo	100 m butterfly
Silver medal – second place	2025 Tokyo	200 m butterfly
Bronze medal – third place	2025 Tokyo	4×100 m freestyle
Bronze medal – third place	2025 Tokyo	4×100 m mixed freestyle

Viola Scotto Di Carlo (born 27 June 2003) is an Italian competitive swimmer. She represented Italy at the 2024 Summer Olympics.
