= Ryutaro Ibara =

Japanese swimmer

Personal information
- Nationality: Japanese
- Born: 1994 (age 31–32) Edogawa Ward, Tokyo

Sport
- Country: Japan
- Sport: swimming
Medal record
Men's swimming
Representing Japan
Event / 1st / 2nd / 3rd; Summer Deaflympics / 8 / 11 / 5
Summer Deaflympics
Gold medal – first place	Taipei 2009	200m backstroke
Gold medal – first place	Caxias do Sul 2021	200m freestyle
Gold medal – first place	Caxias do Sul 2021	200m individual medley
Gold medal – first place	Caxias do Sul 2021	100m butterfly
Gold medal – first place	Caxias do Sul 2021	400m individual medley
Gold medal – first place	Tokyo 2025	200m freestyle
Gold medal – first place	Tokyo 2025	200m individual medley
Gold medal – first place	Tokyo 2025	400m individual medley
Silver medal – second place	Sofia 2013	400m individual medley
Silver medal – second place	Sofia 2013	200m individual medley
Silver medal – second place	Sofia 2013	400m individual medley
Silver medal – second place	Sofia 2013	50m backstroke
Silver medal – second place	Samsun 2017	200m individual medley
Silver medal – second place	Samsun 2017	4x100m medley relay
Silver medal – second place	Samsun 2017	4x200m freestyle relay
Silver medal – second place	Caxias do Sul 2021	4x100m freestyle relay
Silver medal – second place	Caxias do Sul 2021	50m butterfly
Silver medal – second place	Tokyo 2025	400m freestyle
Silver medal – second place	Tokyo 2025	100m butterfly
Silver medal – second place	Tokyo 2025	200m butterfly
Bronze medal – third place	Sofia 2013	100m backstroke
Bronze medal – third place	Sofia 2013	200m backstroke
Bronze medal – third place	Samsun 2017	400m individual medley
Bronze medal – third place	Samsun 2017	4x100m freestyle relay
Bronze medal – third place	Tokyo 2017	4x100m medley relay

Ryutaro Ibara (born 1994) is a Japanese deaf swimmer. He is regarded as one of the most decorated Deaflympic athletes from Japan with a medal tally of 19 at the Deaflympics.

== Biography ==
He was born in Edogawa Ward, Tokyo.

== Career ==
He completed his higher education at the Tokai University. He eventually joined SMBC Nikko Securities as an athlete employee.

He made his Deaflympic debut at the 2009 Summer Deaflympics, when he was still a high school student. At the 2009 Summer Deaflympics, he competed in the men's 50m freestyle, 50m backstroke, 50m butterfly, 100m backstroke, 200m backstroke, 4 × 100 m freestyle relay, 4 × 100 m medley relay and 4 × 200 m medley relay events. He claimed his maiden Deaflympic medal at his first Deaflympic appearance, when he secured a gold medal in the men's 200m backstroke event. He won the 200m backstroke event at 2009 Deaflympics after clocking 2 minutes and 13 seconds. In August 2011, he tied the deaf swimming world record in the men's 400m freestyle category at the 3rd World Deaf Swimming Championships.

He continued his medal success at the Deaflympics during his second Deaflympic appearance in 2013, when he clinched 3 silver medals and 2 bronze medals. At the 2013 Deaflympics, he secured silver medals in the men's 200m individual medley, 400m individual medley and 50m backstroke events, whereas he bagged bronze medals in the men's 100m backstroke and 200m backstroke events. At the 2017 Summer Deaflympics, he clinched silver medals in the men's 200m individual medley, 4 × 100 m medley relay and 4 × 200 m freestyle relay events. He also managed to take home two bronze medals after his participation in the 4 × 100 m freestyle relay and 400m individual medley events during 2017 Deaflympics.

In August 2019, he took part at the 5th World Deaf Swimming Championships and set deaf swimming world records in the men's 200m individual medley and 400m individual medley categories. In his fourth successive appearance at the Deaflympics in 2021, he won multiple gold medals in the men's swimming events and ended his long wait for a Deaflympic gold medal since the 2009 Summer Deaflympics. He claimed gold medals in the men's 200m freestyle, 200m individual medley, 100m butterfly and 400m individual medley events at the 2021 edition of the Summer Deaflympics. He also took home two silver medals, in addition to his gold medal collection during the 2021 Summer Deaflympics.

He initially announced his retirement from swimming after the 2021 Summer Deaflympics, but he withdrew the retirement decision after Tokyo had been officially announced as the host city of the 2025 Summer Deaflympics. The International Committee of Sports for the Deaf adjudged Ryutaro Ibara as the ICSD Sportsman of the Year 2022 following his medal achievements at the 2021 Summer Deaflympics.
