= Marcus Titus =

American swimmer (born 1986)

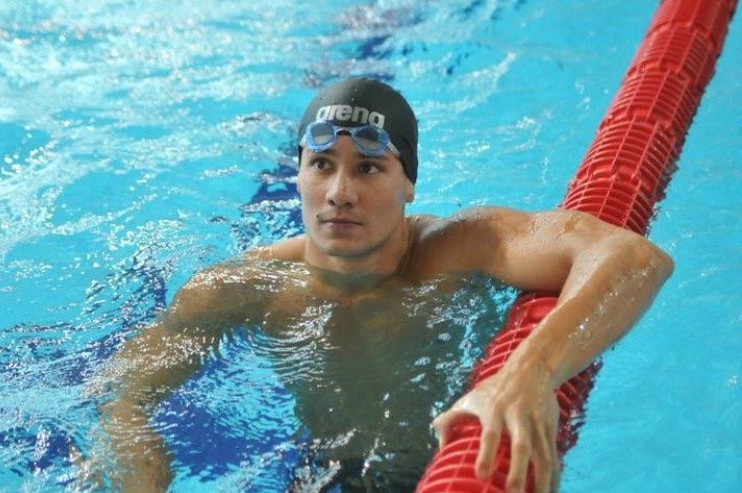
- Titus in 2016

Personal information
- Full name: Marcus James Titus
- Nickname: Marcus Aurelius
- National team: United States
- Born: May 20, 1986 (age 40) Tucson, Arizona, U.S.
- Height: 5 ft 11 in (180 cm)
- Weight: 187 lb (85 kg)

Sport
- Sport: Swimming
- Strokes: Breaststroke, Freestyle
- Club: Tucson Ford Dealers Aquatics (FORDAZ)
- Coach: Busch Frank
Medal record
Pan American Games
Silver medal – second place	2011 Guadalajara	4×100 m medley relay
Bronze medal – third place	2011 Guadalajara	100 m breaststroke

Marcus James Titus (born May 20, 1986) is a deaf American swimmer who has made it as far as eighth place in the 2012 Olympic Trials. Titus won a state championship at Flowing Wells High School and is a 12-time-All-American at Arizona, he was a major figure in the US’s 2008 NCAA championship team, and he was previously a coach for the 2013 Deaflympic team. He is also known for being a spokesperson for deaf and hard-hearing athletes in the swimming world.

Titus is the deaf world record holder in the 50-meter freestyle, 100-meter freestyle, 50-meter breaststroke, and 100-meter breaststroke, all of which he set records for at the World Deaf Championships. Titus's career highlights include finishing third in the 100-meter breaststroke at the 2009 ConocoPhillips National Championships, placing fourth in the same event the following year in 2010, and, lastly, placing third again the year after that in the 2011 ConocoPhillips National Championships.

In his later career, Titus tried out for the 2012 Olympic Trials, coached the 2013 Deaflympic team, and is planning on returning to compete in the 2016 Rio Olympic Trials.

== Early years ==
Marcus Titus was born on May 20, 1986, in Tucson, Arizona. Titus was born deaf. However, his parents, Mark and Mieko Titus, didn't discover this until the age of three. Titus can hear a close-up conversation at about fifty percent capacity when wearing a device in his right ear. His interpreter, Hans Ferguson, helps him communicate better at meets by using hand signals to inform him when to take his mark and begin the race. Titus attended a Deaf Institute until fourth grade, and then went to public school. It was here he found his love for swimming and has continued this dream of competitive swimming. He began swimming at the age of twelve for his high school team, Flowing Wells. There Titus earned four varsity letters in swimming and was named High School All-American as a senior. He participated in the 4x100 medley relay team, helping to lead his team to first place at the National Championships.

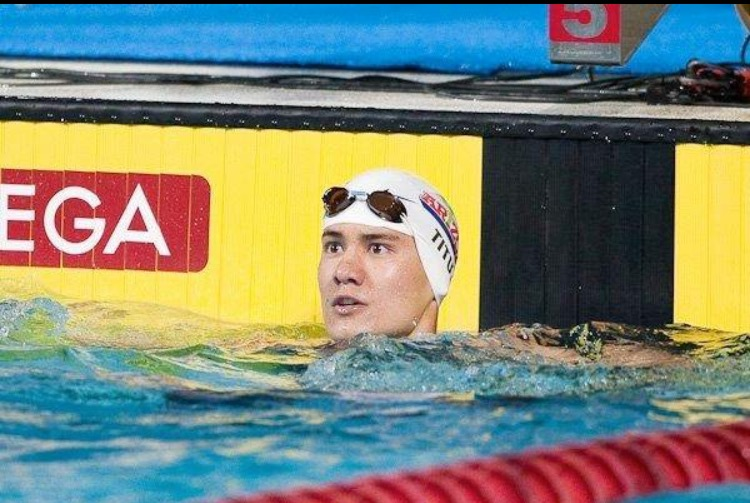
Swimmer Marcus Titus

Titus earned four varsity letters in swimming at Flowing Wells High School in Tucson, Arizona. He participated in the 4x100 medley relay team, helping to lead his team to first place at the National Championships, in which his split time was 1:04.14. At a Speedo Champion Series, Titus took first place in the 100 breaststroke with a time of 1:05.14. Titus was named High School All-American as a senior.

Titus attended the University of Arizona and got his degree in deaf studies/special education. His college swim coach nicknamed him Marcus Aurelius because his name sounded very Roman. Titus also gained the title of a multiple All-American in breaststroke and in medley relay events, placing second in the 2008 NCAAs.

== Swimming career ==
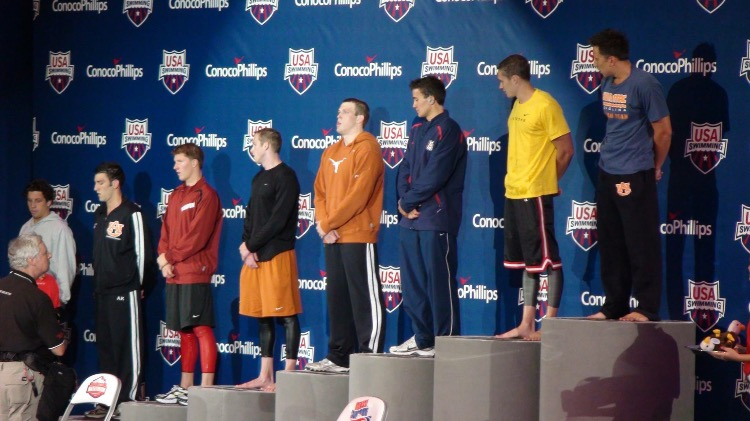
Marcus Titus at a Swimming Award Ceremony during the 2011 ConocoPhillips National Championships

Marcus Titus's swimming career began when he first decided to join his high school swim team at Flowing Wells. He continued swimming throughout all of high school career and eventually continued on with it throughout college when he attended the University of Arizona. He is the Arizona State University and University of Arizona 100 yard breaststroke record holder. With the help of his coach, Frank Busch, Titus made the USA National team three years in a row gaining him recognition. During the Pan American Games, Titus won his medal in the 100-meter breaststroke in Guadalajara, earning his first-ever medal in an international competition. This, along with all the other big events he has attended and placed well, such as NCAA's, US Open, and the Olympic trials, has helped to make him one of the most renowned deaf swimmers in the United States.

At Arizona State University in 2006, Titus acquired a personal best time of 54.28 in the 100m breast at the Pac-10 Championships, setting a new school record. He also finished 10th in the 200m breaststroke with a time of 2:00.58 and 6th in the 100m breaststroke in the 2005, and at the Texas Invitational with a time of 54.77. Titus also gained the title of a multiple All-American in breaststroke and in medley relay events, placing second in the 2008 NCAAs.

Titus originally attempted to make the USA Olympic team in the 2008 Olympic trials in Beijing but fell short. Hoping to make it in the 2012 Olympic trials, Titus competed in the Pan American Games, in Guadalajara, Mexico, to help prepare. He needed to make improvements in his stroke technique to allow for less drag. In the 2012 Olympic trials, Titus posted a time of 1:00:49 in breaststroke, coming in eighth place, just barely missing making the Olympic team by .79 of a second. From his first attempt at the Olympic trials in 2008, Titus shaved off 1.18 seconds off his time in the 2012 Olympic trials. . After this, Titus took a break from competitive swimming to coach the 2013 USA Deaflympics team.

Titus took a position as a coach for the 2013 USA Deaflympics in Sofia, Bulgaria. As coach, Titus led his team to two new world records and multiple American records and medals.

Titus now hopes to try again in 2016 Rio Olympic trials.

== Coaching ==
Titus took a year off from swimming to take a position as a swim coach for the USA team at the 2013 Deaflympics. Besides swimming, Titus hopes to begin a career in coaching swimmers. In 2013, there was a lot of controversy on whether or not Titus should be the head coach for the Deaflympics team. Titus was first nominated by Dale Parker, the Director of U.S. Deaf Swimming (USDS), for the job, but was turned down by the USA Deaf Sports Federation because he was still considered an active participant in swimming and therefore could not juggle both jobs. Parker continued to push for Titus, saying that U.S. Deaf Swimming’s "best candidate to lead the team is Marcus Titus" and arguing that Titus would only be entering in relays while coaching, making him able to take on the responsibilities. Still, USA Deaf Sports Federation still searched for a head coach with a "single role."

=== Influence in Swimming World ===
Other than through his success in swimming, he has also made a positive change for deaf swimmers in races and competitions. He has done this through his efforts in contacting the officials about allowing hand signals during races. After much work and effort put towards getting hand signals in the rule book, US swimming finally deems them mandatory. In a sport that is decided by only fractions of a second, this allows deaf swimmers to be able to do their best during competition without as many obstacles.

USA Swimming decided to allow hand signals at the U.S. Olympic trials, thanks to Titus and his fan base, to accommodate deaf swimmers. Titus, upon hearing USA Swimming would not allow hand signals to comply with international rules, talked to US Swimming through an attorney. When this didn't work, Titus set up a Facebook page to get fans to e-mail USA swimming officials. Before, they only used strobe lights, which is good for deaf and hearing-impaired swimmers to know when to start the race, but not any other cue. Titus took this as a form of discrimination against deaf and hearing-impaired swimmers. While other swimming organizations used hand signals to accommodate those who are hearing-impaired, USA Swimming did not. Titus, backed up by U.S. Deaf Swimming and USA Deaf Sports Federation, finally got USA Swimming to reverse this decision in July 2012 .

Without hand signals, deaf swimmers may face addition challenge. Deaf swimmers need these to hear the referee’ instructions to step up to the starting blocks, take their marks before starting, or even hear the buzzer to dive. In a sport where every millisecond is important, reliance on observing other swimmers for the start may affect performance.

== Awards ==
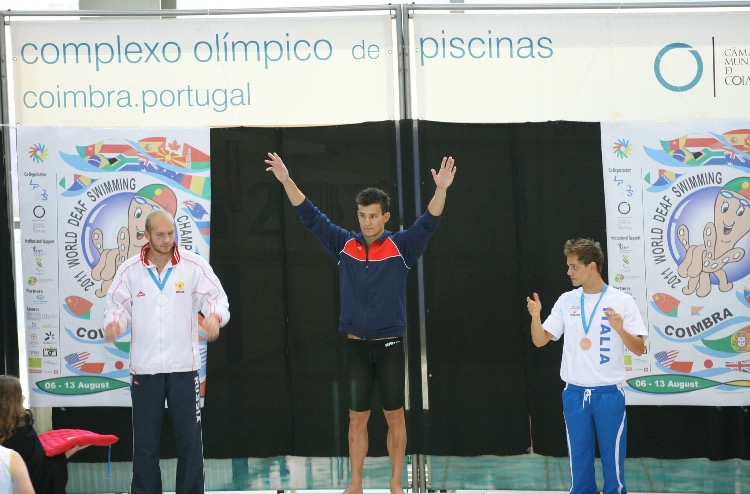
Marcus Titus at awards ceremony at World Deaf Swimming Championships in Portugal

Titus is a 100 breaststroke recorder holder at his university. He placed third in 100m breast at the 2009 ConocoPhillips National Championship as well as fourth in the same event the following year. The last year he competed he got third in the 100m breast at the 2011 ConocoPhillips National Championship. In the 2011 Deaflympics, Titus broke the world record by beating his own record. He was named Swimmer of the Meet when he won five individual gold medals as well as silver and bronze medal at the International Deaf Swimming Competition. Marcus Titus was also in the Mexico Pan American Games in 2011 and won a silver medal in 4x100 medley relay and a bronze medal in 100m breaststroke. In 2012, he almost made it into the Olympic Roster by eight tenths of a second in the 100 breast stroke.

The USDS Team took 19 Swimmers to World Deaf Swimming Championships in Coimbra, Portugal. The team brought back a total of 22 medals (11 Gold, 4 Silver, and 7 Bronze). The USDS (United States Deaf Swim) Team was named 2011 World Deaf Swimming Champions. Titus gained the title "Swimmer of the Meet" after winning five individual gold medals and one individual bronze at the 2011 World Deaf Championships in Portugal. He also won a silver medal and two bronze medals in the relay events. At this meet alone, Titus set deaf world records in the 50m breaststroke, 50m freestyle, and 100m freestyle.

Titus assisted as a coach in Deaflympics and helped the USA Deaflympic team win eighteen new American records and two new world records in the August 2013 Deaflympic Games in Sofia, Bulgaria. The team, made up of eleven swimmers, triumphed with two gold medals, a silver medal, and three bronze medals. The team also accomplished earning multiple personal best times and three American records with two world records.

Meet	Event	Place
2015 Pan American Games	100m Breast stroke (BR)	3 Final
2011 NCAA championships	100m BR; 100y; BR; 200y BR; 200y Medley Relay (MED-R)	4 Final; 11 Final; 5 Final; 6 Final
US Open 2010	400y MED-R; 100m BR	2 Final; 1 Final
2009 NCAAs	400m MED-R; 100y BR; 200y BR; 200y MED-R	7 Final; 15 Final; 12 Final (fn); 9 Final (fn)
TRIALS	400y MED-R; 100m BR; 100m BR	20 Final; 17 Final; 16 Final
2008 Swimvitational	200m BR; 100m BR	5 Final; 24 Final
NCAAs	200m BR; 100y BR; 200y BR; 200y MED-R	2 Final; 10 Final; 5 Final(fn); 5 Final (fn)
2007 Summer Nationals	200y MED-R; 50m Freestyle (FR)	
2007 US OPEN	200m BR; 100 BR	11 Final; 14 Final
2006 Summer NAtionals	200m BR; 400 MED-R	
Summer Nationals	100m BR; 400 MED-R	14 Final
