= 2005 Summer Deaflympics =

International sports event for deaf people

XX Summer Deaflympics
- Host city: Melbourne, Australia
- Motto: Melbourne in the World
- Nations: 63 countries
- Athletes: 2084 athletes
- Events: 147 in 14 sports
- Opening: 5 January 2005
- Closing: 16 January 2005
- Opened by: Marigold Southey
- Main venue: Olympic Park, Melbourne
- Website: 2005deaflympics.com

Summer

Winter

The 2005 Summer Deaflympics, officially known as the 20th Summer Deaflympics, is an international multi-sport event that was celebrated from 5 January to 16 January 2005 in Melbourne, Australia.

== Bidding process ==
A bid for the games was held on 9 March 1999 in Davos, Switzerland.

- Melbourne, Australia - 59
- Košice, Slovakia - 33

== Venues ==
The games were held at eleven different venues.

- Olympic Park - Athletics (track and field), Football, Opening and closing ceremonies
- Melbourne Sports and Aquatic Centre - Badminton, Basketball, Handball, Aquatics (Swimming, Water polo), Table tennis, Volleyball (Indoor), Wrestling
- Ballarat City Oval and Victoria Park - Athletics (Marathon)
- Ballarat - Cycling (1000m Sprint Event, 50 km Individual Point Race, 35 km Time Trial), Orienteering
- Buninyong - Cycling (100 km Road Race)
- Green Gully Reserve - Football
- Kingston Heath Reserve - Football
- Melbourne International Shooting Centre - Shooting
- Boroondara Tennis Centre - Tennis
- Sunshine AMF Bowling Centre - Bowling
- St Kilda Beach - Volleyball (Beach)

== Sports ==
The various sports offered at the 2005 Summer Deaflympics were held in 17 disciplines, including 11 individual sports and 6 team sports:

=== Individual sports ===
- Athletics (44)
- Badminton (6)
- Bowling
- Cycling
- Orienteering
- Shooting
- Swimming
- Table tennis
- Tennis
- Freestyle wrestling (7)
- Greco-Roman wrestling (6)

=== Team sports ===
- Basketball
- Beach volleyball
- Football
- Handball
- Volleyball
- Water polo

== Medal tally ==
* Host nation (Australia)

2005 Summer Deaflympics medal table
Rank	NOC	Gold	Silver	Bronze	Total
1	Ukraine (UKR)	21	17	14	52
2	Russia (RUS)	13	17	26	56
3	South Africa (RSA)	13	4	2	19
4	United States (USA)	9	12	12	33
5	Chinese Taipei (TPE)	9	4	3	16
6	Iran (IRI)	8	6	5	19
7	South Korea (KOR)	7	5	2	14
8	Germany (GER)	6	15	17	38
9	China (CHN)	5	8	4	17
10	Great Britain (GBR)	5	6	6	17
11	Belarus (BLR)	4	8	7	19
12	Sweden (SWE)	4	6	7	17
13	Australia (AUS)*	4	6	3	13
14	Ireland (IRL)	4	5	2	11
15	Italy (ITA)	4	4	7	15
16	Cuba (CUB)	4	2	2	8
17	Poland (POL)	4	1	0	5
18	Japan (JPN)	3	7	1	11
19	Lithuania (LTU)	3	1	4	8
20	India (IND)	3	1	3	7
21	Czech Republic (CZE)	3	1	2	6
22	Estonia (EST)	3	0	2	5
23	Turkey (TUR)	2	5	3	10
24	Kenya (KEN)	1	1	3	5
25	France (FRA)	1	1	1	3
26	Netherlands (NED)	1	0	1	2
26	Serbia and Montenegro (SCG)	1	0	1	2
28	Croatia (CRO)	1	0	0	1
28	Greece (GRE)	1	0	0	1
28	Norway (NOR)	1	0	0	1
28	Portugal (POR)	1	0	0	1
28	Venezuela (VEN)	1	0	0	1
33	Switzerland (SUI)	0	3	2	5
34	Hungary (HUN)	0	1	0	1
34	Slovenia (SLO)	0	1	0	1
34	Spain (ESP)	0	1	0	1
34	Thailand (THA)	0	1	0	1
38	Malaysia (MAS)	0	0	2	2
39	Belgium (BEL)	0	0	1	1
39	Canada (CAN)	0	0	1	1
39	Kazakhstan (KAZ)	0	0	1	1
39	Latvia (LAT)	0	0	1	1
39	Mongolia (MGL)	0	0	1	1
39	Romania (ROM)	0	0	1	1
Totals (44 entries)		150	150	150	450

== See also ==
- 1956 Summer Olympics
- 2006 Commonwealth Games

Preceded by 2001 XIX; Rome, Italy	2005; XX; Melbourne, Australia	Succeeded by 2009 XXI; Taipei, Chinese Taipei
