= 2009 Summer Deaflympics =

21st Summer Deaflympics

21st Summer Deaflympics
- Host city: Taipei, Taiwan
- Motto: Power in me! (English) 無聲的力量! (Traditional Chinese, lit. The Silent Power!)
- Nations: 77
- Athletes: 2,457 (3,354 including staff members)
- Events: 177 in 17 sports (20 disciplines)
- Opening: September 5, 2009
- Closing: September 15, 2009
- Opened by: President Ma Ying-Jeou
- Main venue: Taipei Stadium

Summer

Winter

The 2009 Summer Deaflympics (Chinese: 2009年夏季聽障奧林匹克運動會; pinyin: 2009 Nián Xiàjì tīngzhàng àolínpǐkè yùndònghuì), officially known as the 21st Summer Deaflympics was an international multi-sport event from 5 to 15 September 2009 in Taipei, Taiwan (Republic of China). It was the third Summer Deaflympics to be held in the Asia-Pacific region.

== Bidding process ==
The Chinese Taipei Sport Association for the Deaf expressed its intention to bid for the 2009 Summer Deaflympics following its participation at the 2001 Summer Deaflympics in Rome. Athens, Greece, the host city of the 2004 Summer Olympics and the 2004 Summer Paralympics, was also bidding for the hosting rights.

On November 24, 2002, ICSD President John Lovett arrived in Taipei, and visited all recommended venues and facilities during the one-week stay. The Chinese Taipei Sport Association for the Deaf gave Mr. Lovett multimedia presentations and made arrangements for him to meet with President Chen Shui-bian, Chinese Taipei Olympic Committee Chairman Huang Ta-chou, and other officials.

Taipei was chosen to host the 21st Summer Deaflympics in a vote held at the 38th ICSD session, finishing ahead of Athens, Greece. Below was the vote count that occurred on February 28, 2003, in Sundsvall, Sweden:

2009 Summer Deaflympics Bidding Results
City	National Olympic Committee	Round 1
(Taiwan) Taipei	Chinese Taipei Deaf Sports Federation	52
(Greece) Athens	Hellenic Sports Federation of the Deaf	32

== Preparation ==
Preparation for the Games started in 2005, with an estimated total budget of NT$4.6 billion for the required infrastructure. The demolition and reconstruction of the Taipei Municipal Stadium for the Games alone costed around NT$423 million. The funding was provided by the Taipei City Government and the Sports Affairs Council. The main stadium Taipei Stadium was completed on June 15, 2009, and was certified as a Class 1 Athletics Facility by the IAAF. Besides the ceremonies and athletics, the football finals were also held at the Taipei Stadium.

=== Volunteers ===
According to the Organising Committee's estimates, based on a 2:1 ratio of athletes to volunteers, the Games required approximately 3,000 volunteers. The volunteers were grouped into 3 categories: regular, foreign language and sign language volunteers, all must accept 120 hours training, including basic, work-specific and sign language training. The Taipei Deaflympics have received over 8,000 volunteer applications.

=== Deaflympics Arts Month ===
The Organising Committee has designated August 2009 as the "Taipei Deaflympics Arts Month", during which famous artists and art groups are invited to perform at the Taipei Arena, such as A-mei, Blue Man Group, Dynamic Yunnan, and Minghuayuan. The "Taipei International Deaf Culture Fair" was also held, with a series of exhibitions and activities that promoted understanding of the Deaf culture.

== Marketing ==
The banyan leaf and azalea flower worn by the mascots are Taipei's official tree and flower.

=== Emblem ===
The emblem comes from the shape of the Chinese character for north (Chinese: 北; pinyin: běi; Wade–Giles: pei^{3}), representing the host city Taipei (Chinese: 臺北; pinyin: Táiběi; Wade–Giles: Tʻai²-pei³), with an ear representing the Deaflympics, and a figure as the main body representing the athletes. The design uses the blue, white and red color scheme of the national flag and simple, flowing calligraphic lines, evoking the "image of running man". It symbolizes the courageous spirits of the athletes as they excel and meet the challenges as well as the vitality of Taiwan.

=== Motto ===
The 2009 Summer Deaflympics motto is "Power in me!". The Chinese version is "無聲的力量" (literally, "The Power of Silence").

=== Mascots ===
The Games' mascots are two Taipei tree frogs (one male and one female). The mascots have their arms wide open, in a welcoming pose that looks like the Chinese character "北", which represents the host city Taipei.

A mascot naming contest was held by the Organising Committee. The names chosen are "Peace" for the male frog mascot and "Love" for the female frog mascot.

=== Theme song ===
The theme song is "Dreams You Can Hear" (Chinese: 聽得見的夢想), performed by A-mei.

=== Corporate sponsorship ===
Sponsors of the 2009 Summer Deaflympics
Official Partners
- 7-Eleven
- China Airlines
- Chunghwa Telecom
- Delta Electronics
- Formosa Petrochemical
- Giant Bicycles
- Luxgen
- MetLife
- PepsiCo (Quaker Oats Company)
- PX Mart
- Samsung Electronics
Partners
- Nike, Inc.
- Phoenix Television
- Rotary International
Official Sponsors
- Coca-Cola
- Fubon Financial Holding
- Secom
- Victor
Corporate Sponsors
- 3M
- Chia Te Bakery
- Pacific Sogo
- Starbucks
- Sunkey Technologies (Nulife)
- Taiwan Power Company
- Taiwan Taxi
- Taiwan Tobacco and Liquor Corporation (Taiwan Beer)
- TWTC International Trade Building
- White Sugar Cane Healthy Shabu Shabu House
- Wintec
Sponsors
- 360 Digital Media
- Core Pacific City
- Formosa Blue Way Jean
- HeimaVista
- Importek
- Matthew Beaux Art
- PSA Charitable Foundation
- Rich Jade

== Sports ==
The various sports offered at the 2009 Summer Deaflympics were held in 20 disciplines, including 15 individual sports and 5 team sports: Judo, karate, and taekwondo were recognized as new summer disciplines in the Deaflympics sports competition program.

=== Individual sports ===
- Athletics (43)
- Badminton (6)
- Bowling (10)
- Cycling (4)
- Judo (10)
- Karate (5)
- Orienteering (8)
- Shooting (10)
- Swimming (38)
- Table tennis (7)
- Taekwondo (7)
- Tennis (5)
- Wrestling
  - Freestyle (7)
  - Greco-Roman (7)

=== Team sports ===
- Basketball (2)
- Beach volleyball (2)
- Football (2)
- Handball (1)
- Volleyball (2)
- Water polo (1)

== Venues ==
The Games were held in 22 venues, most of which located in Taipei City and Taipei County (now New Taipei City). Some events were held in Taoyuan County and Hsinchu County, namely swimming and water polo in Hsinchu County Swimming Plaza, shooting in Taoyuan County Gongxi Shooting Range, and tennis (backup venue for rain) in Taoyuan campus of National Taiwan Sport University.

- Opening/Closing Ceremonies: Taipei Stadium
- Athletics: Taipei Stadium, Zhongzheng Senior High School (Backup Venue), Yangming Senior High School (Backup Venue)
- Marathon: Northern Coast Highway
- Badminton: Taipei Gymnasium
- Basketball: Taipei Gymnasium
- Beach volleyball: Pacific Green Bay
- Bowling: Xinqiaofu Bowling Center
- Cycling, Road: Northern Coast Highway (Road Race), Taipei City Hall Plaza (Points Race, Time Trial)
- Football: Taipei Stadium (Final), Yingfeng Riverside Sport Park (Preliminary)
- Handball: Chenggong Senior High School
- Judo: Taiwan Police College
- Karate: Nangang Sports Center
- Orienteering: Yangmingshan National Park
- Shooting: Gongxi Shooting Range
- Swimming: Hsinchu County Swimming Plaza
- Table tennis: Taipei Arena
- Taekwondo: National Taipei University of Education
- Tennis: Rainbow Riverside Sport Park, National Taiwan Sport University (Backup Venue for Rain)
- Volleyball: National Taiwan University, Xinzhuang Stadium
- Water polo: Hsinchu County Swimming Plaza
- Wrestling, Freestyle: Chinese Culture University
- Wrestling, Greco-Roman: Chinese Culture University

== Participating Deaf Sports Federations ==
80 Deaf Sports Federations have registered with ICSD:

- Argentina (57)
- Armenia (5)
- Australia (34)
- Austria (25)
- Azerbaijan (4)
- Belarus (46)
- Belgium (11)
- Belize (5)
- Bolivia (2)
- Brazil (17)
- Bulgaria (23)
- Canada (25)
- Chile (2)
- China (100)
- Colombia (21)
- Croatia (36)
- Cuba (3)
- Cyprus (8)
- Czech Republic (19)
- Denmark (61)
- Estonia (25)
- Fiji (18)
- Finland (23)
- France (64)
- Germany (184)
- Ghana (48)
- Greece (70)
- Hong Kong (47)
- Hungary (26)
- India (29)
- Indonesia (17)
- Iran (68)
- Ireland (47)
- Israel (23)
- Italy (85)
- Japan (226)
- Kazakhstan (63)
- Kenya (35)
- South Korea (86)
- Kyrgyzstan (15)
- Latvia (5)
- Lithuania (54)
- Macau (3)
- Macedonia (6)
- Malaysia (7)
- Malta (3)
- Mexico (5)
- Moldova (2)
- Mongolia (19)
- Netherlands (19)
- New Zealand (8)
- Nigeria (51)
- Norway (9)
- Pakistan (13)
- Peru (2)
- Philippines (7)
- Poland (50)
- Portugal (22)
- Puerto Rico (3)
- Russia (284)
- Saudi Arabia (13)
- Serbia (15)
- Seychelles (3)
- Singapore (10)
- Slovakia (10)
- Slovenia (19)
- South Africa (41)
- Spain (47)
- Sweden (43)
- Switzerland (20)
- Chinese Taipei (173) (host)
- Thailand (45)
- Turkey (111)
- Ukraine (179)
- United Arab Emirates (12)
- United Kingdom (92)
- United States (167)
- Uzbekistan (18)
- Venezuela (54)
- Yemen (7)

== Opening ceremony ==
The Organising Committee of the 21st Summer Deaflympics recruited acclaimed Taiwanese playwright and theatre director Dr. Stan Lai as the Games' Art Director, and to orchestrate the opening and closing ceremonies.

According to Stan Lai, ceremony general director, the opening of the Deaflympics will be a "memorable event that will call forth the beauty of the human heart and reach out to the deaf community." It will be divided into 12 acts, including a performance titled "Impossible Dream" by renowned Taiwanese model Patina Lin. Completely covered in body paint, Lin will float across a 50-meter projection screen to create the illusion of a goddess walking through air and water. She will also perform along with children from schools for the hearing-impaired, using sign language to express the message of "Power in Me," Lai said.

World-renowned deaf percussionist Evelyn Glennie has been invited to perform at the opening ceremony, as well as the local drumming group U-Theatre, and more than 80 children from schools for the hearing-impaired in Taipei and Taichung cities, according to Lai.

The team from the People's Republic of China did not attend the opening ceremony. Neither side has officially given the reason, although most news sites are attributing it to the Dalai Lama's recent trip to Taiwan. The People's Republic of China had previously not attended the opening of the World Games which was held in Kaohsiung earlier in the year. Nonetheless, China has sent 63 hearing impaired dancers from the Mainland China to perform the "1,000 hand Bodhisattva" at the ceremony.

== Closing ceremony ==
In a creative move due a lack of time, a banquet where 12 typical Taiwanese dishes were served at 350 tables dominated the closing ceremony for the 11-day event in Taipei. The parades, fireworks and arts performances usually seen at such events were also present, but played a secondary role. The menu for the banquet included peanuts from Yunlin County, beef noodles, pineapple cakes, highland tea, and mango shaved ice, accompanied by pearl milk tea and vinegar-based fruit drinks. Some of the foods had been seen at the September 5th opening in a plastic and cloth version during a show representing the best of Taiwanese cuisine and culture. While the athletes tucked into the local delicacies, the 14,000 members of the public were able to exchange their tickets for food valued at NT$200 per person.

Performances including Taiwanese opera from the famous Ming Hwa Yuan troupe, lion dances, drums, and some songs performances, from Aaron Kwok, a pop star from Hong Kong. He said with passion, "I witnessed a successful closing ceremony tonight. Just like I've said during the performance, the Deaflympics touches our heart and Taipei has touched the world." A movie was also presented depicting the athletic highlights of the 2009 Summer Deaflympics.

At the end, the flag was passed on to the Greek capital of Athens, the current host of the 2013 Summer Deaflympics. The fourth Deaflympics in the Asia-Pacific region will also be preserved in history as the best ever for host Chinese Taipei, which won 11 gold medals, 11 silvers and 11 bronzes. The country placed fifth for the number of medals won, with Russia coming first after collecting 29 golds, 40 silvers and 28 bronzes. Ukraine came second, South Korea third, and the People's Republic of China fourth.

Chinese Taipei's strongest performances were on show in bowling, table tennis, and taekwondo, the Korean martial art that has also brought success to Taipei athletes at Olympic Games. One Taipei athlete alone, Chang Yao-chien, collected four golds in women's bowling. Nevertheless, the country still fell narrowly short of its self-set goal of 12 gold medals, which officials blamed on the limited source of talent available.

On the political side of the sporting event, the People's Republic of China announced earlier it would be present for the closing ceremony, after having missed the opening, widely thought to have been planned that way to avoid the presence of President Ma Ying-jeou. The team's deputy leader, Zhao Sujing, told reporters that the 78 Chinese participants had to come together in Beijing from all parts of China first, and that problems with airline ticketing had caused them to miss earlier flights to Taipei. However, more than ten athletes were to be present in Taiwan to participate in the closing ceremony. The People's Republic of China won 12 golds, nine silver and 17 bronze medals, or double its amount at the Melbourne Deaflympics four years ago. Praising the organization, International Committee of Sports for the Deaf President Donalda Ammons used sign language to say "the Taipei Deaflympics were the best ever."

She received the keys to Taipei and the honorary citizenship of the city from the hands of Mayor of Taipei Hau Lung-pin. He bestowed similar honors on other ICSD officials, including executive member and China team leader Yang Yang, the first-ever Chinese citizen to receive honorary citizenship in Taipei.

Overall, most regarded the ceremony as a success. The only "unwelcome intrusion to an otherwise perfect ending was the deportation of a Spanish athlete for alleged sexual harassment of a volunteer."

== Medal tally ==
* Host nation (Chinese Taipei)

2009 Summer Deaflympics medal table
Rank	NOC	Gold	Silver	Bronze	Total
1	Russia (RUS)	29	41	29	99
2	Ukraine (UKR)	20	22	25	67
3	South Korea (KOR)	14	13	7	34
4	China (CHN)	12	9	17	38
5	Chinese Taipei (TPE)	11	11	12	34
6	Belarus (BLR)	10	6	7	23
7	United States (USA)	10	5	7	22
8	South Africa (RSA)	8	2	2	12
9	Japan (JPN)	5	6	9	20
10	Sweden (SWE)	5	2	3	10
11	Turkey (TUR)	4	6	8	18
12	Italy (ITA)	4	5	5	14
13	France (FRA)	4	2	6	12
14	Estonia (EST)	4	2	2	8
15	Kenya (KEN)	4	2	1	7
16	Germany (GER)	3	8	12	23
17	Iran (IRI)	3	5	5	13
18	Australia (AUS)	3	2	1	6
19	Venezuela (VEN)	3	1	2	6
20	Lithuania (LTU)	2	4	7	13
21	Latvia (LAT)	2	3	0	5
22	Hungary (HUN)	2	0	3	5
23	Cuba (CUB)	2	0	2	4
23	Portugal (POR)	2	0	2	4
25	Norway (NOR)	2	0	0	2
26	Great Britain (GBR)	1	4	5	10
27	Poland (POL)	1	2	1	4
28	Bulgaria (BUL)	1	1	3	5
29	Mongolia (MGL)	1	0	3	4
30	Switzerland (SUI)	1	0	2	3
31	New Zealand (NZL)	1	0	1	2
31	Puerto Rico (PUR)	1	0	1	2
33	Croatia (CRO)	1	0	0	1
33	Finland (FIN)	1	0	0	1
33	Netherlands (NED)	1	0	0	1
36	Greece (GRE)	0	2	3	5
37	Canada (CAN)	0	2	0	2
37	Nigeria (NGR)	0	2	0	2
39	Ireland (IRL)	0	1	1	2
39	Malaysia (MAS)	0	1	1	2
39	Serbia (SRB)	0	1	1	2
42	Czech Republic (CZE)	0	1	0	1
42	Slovakia (SVK)	0	1	0	1
42	Spain (ESP)	0	1	0	1
45	Argentina (ARG)	0	0	2	2
45	Austria (AUT)	0	0	2	2
47	Brazil (BRA)	0	0	1	1
47	Denmark (DEN)	0	0	1	1
47	Hong Kong (HKG)	0	0	1	1
47	India (IND)	0	0	1	1
47	Kazakhstan (KAZ)	0	0	1	1
47	Kyrgyzstan (KGZ)	0	0	1	1
47	Mexico (MEX)	0	0	1	1
47	Saudi Arabia (KSA)	0	0	1	1
47	Uzbekistan (UZB)	0	0	1	1
Totals (55 entries)		178	176	209	563

== Calendar ==
In the following calendar for the 2009 Summer Deaflympics, each blue box represents an event competition. The yellow boxes represent days during which medal-awarding finals for a sport are held. The number in each yellow box represents the number of finals that are contested on that day.

●	Opening ceremony	Event competitions	Event finals	●	Closing ceremony

September 2009	4th Fri	5th Sat	6th Sun	7th Mon	8th Tue	9th Wed	10th Thu	11th Fri	12th Sat	13th Sun	14th Mon	15th Tue	Events
Ceremonies		●										●	—N/a
Athletics				2	9	7		5	9	9	4		43
Badminton					1						5		6
Basketball											2		2
Beach Volleyball											2		2
Bowling					2	2		4			2		10
Cycling Road			1		1		1		1				4
Football											1	1	2
Handball									1				1
Judo					4	4	2						10
Karate				2	3								5
Orienteering					2	2		2		2			8
Shooting			1	1	1	1	1	2	1	1	1		10
Swimming				6	6	7		7	5	7			38
Table Tennis						2		1	2		2		7
Taekwondo			2	2	2	1							7
Tennis								1	2	2			5
Volleyball										2			2
Water Polo										1			1
Wrestling				4	3		4	3					14
Total	0	0	5	17	34	26	8	25	21	24	19	1	177

== See also ==
- List of sporting events in Taiwan

Preceded by 2005 XX; Melbourne	Summer Deaflympics; XXI; Taipei	Succeeded by 2013 XXII; Sofia/Füssen
