= List of deaf people =

Notable Deaf people are typically defined as those who have profound hearing loss in both ears as a result of either acquired or congenital hearing loss. Such people may be associated with Deaf culture. Deafness (little to no hearing) is distinguished from partial hearing loss or damage (such as tinnitus), which is less severe impairment in one or both sides. The definition of deafness varies across countries, cultures, and time, though the World Health Organization classes profound hearing loss as the failure to hear a sound of 90 decibels or louder in a hearing test.

In addition to those with profound hearing loss, people without profound hearing loss may also identify as Deaf, often where the person is active within a Deaf community and for whom sign language is their primary language. Those who have mostly lived as a hearing person and acquire deafness briefly, due to a temporary illness or shortly before death, for example, are not typically classed as culturally Deaf.

== Deaf educators and organizers ==
- Ferdinand Berthier, French intellectual, published several articles, first Deaf person to receive the French Legion of Honour, founder of world's first Deaf organization
- Julia Brace (1807–1884), early American DeafBlind student at the Hartford School for the Deaf
- Laura Bridgman, (1829–1889), American, first DeafBlind student of Dr. Samuel Howe at the Perkins School for the Blind
- Teresa de Cartagena, Spanish conversa nun and mystic author of the 15th century who became Deaf in later life. The first mystic author in Spanish.
- Laurent Clerc (1785–1869), student and teacher (1798–1816) at the Paris Deaf school of the Abbé de l'Épée; accompanied Thomas Gallaudet to America to teach deaf children. Co-founded the first Deaf school in North America in 1817 in Hartford, Connecticut.
- Alice Cogswell, the first Deaf student at American School for the Deaf.
- Robert R. Davila, the ninth president of Gallaudet University
- Pierre Desloges (1742–?), French Deaf writer and bookbinder, first known Deaf person to publish a book
- Gilbert Eastman (1934–2016), American educator, actor, playwright, author, and television host
- Jane Fernandes, the first Deaf woman to serve as president of an American college or university at Guilford College (2014-2021) in Greensboro, NC and the first Deaf woman to head a school for the Deaf Hawaii School for the Deaf and Blind (1990-1995) Currently president of Antioch College in Yellow Springs, Ohio
- Andrew Foster, (1925–1987), American educator, the first Black Deaf person to earn a bachelor's degree from Gallaudet College, Christian missionary to Africa
- T. Alan Hurwitz, the tenth president of Gallaudet University and former Vice President of National Technical Institute for the Deaf
- Casar Jacobson, Norwegian-Canadian first-ever deaf winner of Miss Canada (2013), a disability rights activist and the UN Woman Youth Champion.
- I. King Jordan, the first Deaf president (eighth overall) of Gallaudet University
- Liisa Kauppinen (born 1939), Finnish human rights activist, former president of the World Federation of the Deaf
- Helen Keller, American Deafblind writer, lecturer, and actress
- Dorothy Miles, Deaf poet and activist
- Lawrence R. Newman, Deaf educator and activist, and served two terms as President of the National Association of the Deaf
- Michael Ndurumo, a Deaf educator from Kenya, the third deaf person from Africa to be awarded a PhD
- Marie Jean Philip, a teacher and leading international advocate for the right to sign language
- George Veditz, the former president of the National Association of the Deaf, and one of the first people to film sign language
- Isaac Muhumuza, Ugandan Deaf disability inclusion advocate, youth researcher, and educator focusing on the rights of Deaf and hard-of-hearing persons in Africa.

== Actors ==
- Shelley Beattie, American actress and bodybuilder
- Sean Berdy, actor and comedian
- Linda Bove, actress, known particularly for the role of Linda the Librarian on the children's television program Sesame Street
- Deanne Bray, actress who played the lead role on Sue Thomas: F.B.Eye
- Millie Bobby Brown, an actress from Stranger Things, totally deaf in one ear
- James Cavalry, American actor
- Stephen Colbert, actor, comedian, and talk show host, totally deaf in his right ear.
- Aryana Engineer, actress
- Lou Ferrigno, American actor and bodybuilder
- Phyllis Frelich, American actress, Best Actress in a Broadway play: Children of a Lesser God 1980
- Russell Harvard, actor whose first language is American Sign Language
- Bob Hiltermann, actor, writer, director, and musician
- Emilio Insolera, Italian actor and director of Sign Gene
- Troy Kotsur (Best Supporting Actor) for his role in "CODA"
- Ryan Lane, actor and model
- Gabriella Leon, English actress
- Marlee Matlin, first Deaf person to win an Academy Award (Best Actress) for her role in Children of a Lesser God
- Leslie Nielsen, Canadian-American comedic actor who was legally deaf
- Audree Norton, American actress and educator, one of the founding members of the National Theatre of the Deaf
- Lauren Ridloff, an American actress, played the role of Connie (a Deaf character) in the ninth season of The Walking Dead. In Eternals, released in 2021, she played the Deaf superhero Makkari.
- Sandra Mae Frank, American actress, played the role of Dr. Elizabeth Wilder in the forth & fifth season of New Amsterdam
- Emerson Romero, Cuban-American silent film actor, developed the first technique to caption sound films
- Terrylene Sacchetti, actress
- Howie Seago, actor and director
- Millicent Simmonds, Deaf actress
- Shoshannah Stern, actress in Jericho and Weeds whose first language is American Sign Language
- Alexandria Wailes, Deaf actress, dancer, and educator
- Bruce Willis, American actor, producer, and singer, 70% deaf in his left ear

== Artists ==
- Chuck Baird, (1947–2012), American painter and performer, one of the founding members of the De'Via Deaf art movement
- Bernard Bragg, performer, writer, director, poet, and artist
- John Brewster Jr. (1766–1854) portraitist and miniaturist in Connecticut, Massachusetts and Maine in the Federalist period in America
- Edward Caledon Bruce (1825-1900), American painter, author, and publisher
- John Carlin (1813-1891), American painter
- Thomas Davidson, RA an English painter specializing in historical naval scenes (1842–1919)
- Isabelle Jane Foulkes (1970–2001) Anglo-Welsh artist, textile designer and disability campaigner; designed the Welsh fingerspelling alphabet
- Walter Geikie, Scottish painter
- Francisco Goya (1746-1828) Spanish painter, became deaf at age 47.
- David Hockney (b. 1937), British painter
- Regina Olson Hughes, American Illustrator
- Jan (born 1939) Spanish comic artist. Deaf since age 6.
- Betty G. Miller, American artist
- Maurycy Minkowski, deaf Polish Jewish artist (1881/2–1930)
- Juan Fernández Navarrete, Spanish Mannerist painter (1526–79)
- Albert Newsam (1809–1864) lithographer, and student of Catlin
- Will J. Quinlan, American artist, etcher, painter
- Slava Raškaj (1877–1906), Croatian painter
- Granville Redmond, American painter, actor
- Alfred Thomson, an English artist and Olympic Gold Medalist (1894–1979)
- Douglas Tilden, American sculptor
- Frederick LaMonto, American sculptor, artist. (1921-1981)

== Musicians ==
- Ailís Ní Ríain, Irish composer
- Ludwig van Beethoven, German composer and pianist, who acquired almost complete deafness by age 44.
- William Boyce, a British composer who acquired deafness in his late 40s
- Sean Forbes, American musician, songwriter, and rapper
- TL Forsberg, American avant-garde rock singer who identifies as deaf
- Evelyn Glennie, Scottish percussionist, won Grammy for Best Musician in a Recording 1989: Bartok's Sonata for Two Pianos and Percussion
- Mandy Harvey, American jazz singer and a finalist of America's Got Talent (season 12)
- Geraldine Lawhorn, musician, actress, instructor and first Deafblind African-American person to earn a college degree
- Signmark, Finnish rap artist
- Bedřich Smetana, Czech composer who became completely deaf at age 50
- Mariko Takamura, Deaf Japanese musician
- Jeshurun Vincent, Malaysian, traveling musician, author, and inspirational speaker who gained recognition for his global musical journey despite being partially deaf.
- Big Ocean, first hard of hearing South Korean boy band

== Scientists ==
- Guillaume Amontons, French inventor and physicist
- Annie Jump Cannon, Harvard astronomer recognized for her work in stellar classification
- Thomas Edison, American businessperson and inventor
- John Goodricke, (1764–1786), English astronomer
- Olaf Hassel, Norwegian astronomer
- Nansie S. Sharpless, American biochemist
- Henrietta Swan Leavitt, American astronomer
- Konstantin Tsiolkovsky, Russian astronomer

== Sports ==
- Cecilia Hanhikoski, Finnish snowboarder and futsal player
- Ashley Fiolek, American motocross racer and stunt actress
- Yehuda Gruenfeld, Israeli chess grandmaster
- Matt Hammill, American mixed martial arts fighter
- Gerry Hughes, British sailor
- Jim Kyte, Canadian hockey player
- Rebecca Macree, British squash player
- Robert Marchand, American masters cyclist
- Caleb McDuff, British Racing Driver
- Mike Murphy, American athletic trainer
- Kitty O'Neil, American race driver and stunt actress
- Jodie Ounsley, British Rugby Union player
- Aimee Walker Pond, American gymnast
- Jock Porter, British motorcycle racer
- Marie Roethlisberger, American gymnast
- Lana Skeledžija, Croatian sport shooter
- Melanie Stabel, German sport shooter
- Joe Swail, Northern Irish snooker player
- Laurentia Tan, Singaporean Paralympic equestrian
- Tone Tangen Myrvoll, Norwegian runner, skier, and orienteer
- Margareta Trnková-Hanne, Czech sprinter and tennis player
- Ildikó Újlaky-Rejtő, Hungarian fencer and Olympic champion
- Boris Verlinsky, Ukrainian-Russian chess master
- Melinda Vernon, Australian distance runner, triathlete and swimmer
- Heidi Zimmer, American mountaineer

=== American football ===
- Albert Berg, American football player, coach, and writer
- Derrick Coleman, American fullback and Super Bowl champion
- Gilbert O. Erickson, American college football player and photographer
- Bonnie Sloan, American defensive tackle and first deaf person drafted to the National Football League
- Kenny Walker, American gridiron player and first deaf player in the Canadian Football League
- Blaise Winter, American coach and former defensive end in the NFL

=== Association football ===
- Eunate Arraiza, Spanish defender/midfielder
- Cliff Bastin, English forward for Arsenal
- Jozo Bogdanović, Croatian forward
- Stan Burton, English winger
- Memnos Costi, English footballer and television presenter
- Damir Desnica, Croatian forward
- Matthew Eby, American defender/midfielder
- Thomas Elliott, British forward
- Albert Gardner, English midfielder
- Danielle Gibbons, English goalkeeper
- Andy Greig, Scottish goalkeeper
- Stefan Markolf, German defender
- Athiel Mbaha, Namibian goalkeeper and international at the Africa Cup of Nations
- Simon Ollert, German forward
- John Tosswill, English forward

=== Athletics ===
- Nele Alder-Baerens, German distance runner
- Natasha Bacchus, Canadian sprinter
- Dean Barton-Smith, Australian decathlete
- Edie Boyer, American discus thrower
- Suslaidy Girat, Cuban sprinter and jumper
- Emilija Manninen, Estonian hurdler
- Marie-Paule Miller, French heptathlete
- Amy-Lea Mills, Australian javelin thrower
- Dawn Moncrieffe, Canadian middle-distance runner
- Trude Raad, Norwegian thrower
- Ruth Taubert Seeger, American sprinter and jumper
- Evgenii Shvetcov, Russian Paralympic runner
- Vyacheslav Skomorokhov, Ukrainian-Soviet hurdler
- Gerhard Sperling, East German racewalker
- Beryl Wamira, Kenyan sprinter
- Rita Windbrake, German runner

=== Baseball ===
- Michael Cuddyer, American outfielder in MLB during 2001–2015; two-time MLB All-Star
- Dummy Deegan, American pitcher for the New York Giants in 1901
- Ed Dundon, American pitcher and first deaf player in MLB, in 1883–1884
- Tyson Gillies, Canadian outfielder and Pan American Games gold medalist
- Dummy Hoy, American center fielder and most accomplished deaf player in MLB, during 1888–1902
- Yuya Ishii, Japanese pitcher in Nippon Professional Baseball
- Dummy Leitner, American pitcher in MLB during 1901–1902
- Curtis Pride, American outfielder in MLB during 1993–2006; college baseball coach
- Dick Sipek, American outfielder for the Cincinnati Reds in 1945
- Dummy Stephenson, American outfielder for the Philadelphia Phillies in 1892
- Dummy Taylor, American pitcher in MLB during 1901–1908

=== Basketball ===
- Lance Allred, American forward and first legally-deaf NBA player
- Buffalo Silents, a 1920s American all-deaf team
- Tamika Catchings, American small forward, 2012 WNBA champion and four-time Olympic gold medallist
- Wissam Constantin, Lebanese forward and first deaf player in the Lebanese Basketball League
- Cecilia Ferm, Swedish international player
- Emma Meesseman, Belgian player in the WNBA
- Ronda Jo Miller, American player and first deaf woman to try out for the WNBA
- Miha Zupan, Slovenian power forward

=== Cricket ===
- Anjan Bhattacharjee, Indian first-class bowler for Bihar
- Lance Cairns, New Zealand all-rounder and international test player
- John Hodgkins, English first-class all-rounder for Nottinghamshire
- Charlie McLeod, Australian all-rounder and international test player
- Imran Sheikh, former captain of the deaf India national team
- Baba Sidhaye, Indian first-class all-rounder and first national-level deaf-mute player
- Umesh Valjee, former captain of the deaf England national team

=== Swimming ===
- Carli Cronk, American swimmer, Deaflympic Champion winning 12 gold in a single Games, and deaf world record holder
- Cindy-Lu Bailey, Australian swimmer and 29-time Deaflympic medalist
- Peggy de Villiers, South African swimmer and Deaflympian
- Natalia Deeva, Belarusian swimmer and four-time Deaflympic champion
- Gertrude Ederle, American Olympic medalist and the first woman to swim the English channel
- Jeff Float, American swimmer and Olympic and world champion
- Reed Gershwind, American swimmer and 30-time Deaflympic medalist
- Danielle Joyce, British swimmer and two-time Deaflympic champion
- Matthew Klotz, American swimmer and deaf world record holder
- Cornell Loubser, South African swimmer and Deaflympic medalist
- Jill Diana Lovett, British swimmer and Deaflympian
- Rebecca Meyers, American swimmer and visually-impaired Paralympic champion
- Linda Neumann, German swimmer and Deaflympic medalist
- Terence Parkin, South African swimmer and Olympic and world medalist
- Alexandra Polivanchuk, Swedish swimmer and Deaf world record holder
- Anna Polivanchuk, Swedish swimmer and Deaf world record holder, sister of Alexandra
- Taranath Narayan Shenoy, Indian Deafblind open water swimmer and swimmer of the English channel

=== Tennis ===
- Vidisha Baliyan, Indian tennis player and beauty pageant contestant
- Emily Hangstefer, American tennis player and Deaflympian
- Jafreen Shaik, Indian tennis player and Deaflympian
- Mario Kargl, Austrian tennis player and former Deaf world champion
- Lee Duck-hee, South Korean tennis player and twice competitor on the ATP Challenger Tour
- Gábor Máthé, Hungarian champion and Deaflympic champion
- Angela Mortimer, British tennis player and multiple Grand Slam winner
- Barbara Oddone, Italian tennis player and multiple Deaflympic champion
- Prithvi Sekhar, Indian tennis player and Deaflympian

=== Winter sports ===
- Jenny Berrigan, American snowboarder
- Brenda Davidson, Canadian curler
- Emma Logan, Canadian curler
- Jakub Nosek, Czech bobsledder
- Margarita Noskova, Russian snowboarder
- Anna Surmilina, Russian snowboarder
- Jack Ulrich, Canadian ice hockey player
- Lauren Weibert, American snowboarder

== Writers ==
- Rashida Abedi, Pakistani-British autobiographical writer
- Kashaf Alvi, Pakistani writer
- Kathleen L. Brockway, author, historian, and deaf rights' activist
- John Lee Clark, American deafblind poet
- Willy Conley, playwright, actor, photographer
- Agatha Tiegel Hanson, American writer
- Eugen Relgis, Romanian humanist writer and political activist
- Michael Chorost, writer and technologist who wrote on his experience of cochlear implants
- Angeline Fuller Fischer, American writer
- Harold MacGrath, American author
- Pierre de Ronsard, French poet
- Laura C. Redden Searing,(1893–1923), Civil war journalist, biographer, and poet
- Louise Stern, writer and artist
- Ted Supalla, researcher and professor
- Clayton Valli, Deaf linguist and ASL poet
- David Wright, South African-born British poet
- Judith Wright, Australian poet

== Other occupations ==
- Dimitra Arapoglou, a Deaf member of the Greek parliament, from 2007 to 2009
- Alice of Battenberg, a German Princess in the 19th and 20th century
- Marla Berkowitz, ASL interpreter; as of 2020, the only Deaf ASL interpreter in the US state of Ohio
- Earnest Elmo Calkins, a Deaf American advertising executive who pioneered the use of art in advertising
- Nyle DiMarco, season 22 Dancing with the Stars champion and 2015 winner of America's Next Top Model
- Haben Girma, first Deafblind graduate of Harvard Law School
- Claudia L. Gordon, lawyer
- Olof Hanson, architect
- Helen Heckman, dancer
- Henrietta Howard, Countess of Suffolk
- Juliette Gordon Low, founder of the Girl Scouts of the USA who became completely deaf age 17.
- Charlotte Lamberton, dancer
- Mojo Mathers (b. 1966), New Zealand politician
- Florence Lewis May, American textile curator
- Roger Demosthenes O'Kelly (b. 1880), Deafblind black lawyer, Yale alumnus
- Dame Kathleen Ollerenshaw (b. 1912), British mathematician and politician
- François d'Orléans, Prince of Joinville, French prince and naval commander
- Opu Daeng Risaju, Indonesian independence activist.
- Andrew Phillips, lawyer
- Rikki Poynter, Deaf YouTuber and activist.
- Punk Chef, celebrity Deaf chef from the UK
- Elizabeth Steel, the earliest record of a deaf person in Australia
- Sue Thomas, first Deaf person to work as an undercover investigator doing lip-reading of suspects for the Federal Bureau of Investigation
- Heather Whitestone, first Deaf woman to win the title of Miss America
- Nellie Zabel Willhite, pilot
- Mabel Hubbard Bell, wife of telephone inventor Alexander Graham Bell

== Fictional characters ==
- Connie, a Deaf character that fights zombies in AMC's The Walking Dead series.
- Echo, a Deaf Native American martial artist from Marvel Comics.
- Drury Lane, a Deaf detective written by Ellery Queen.
- Jade Lovall, a partially deaf nurse in the BBC medical drama Casualty.
- Gabriella, a Deaf mermaid and one of Ariel's friends in The Little Mermaid.
- Hawkeye (Clint Barton), a Deaf archer from marvel comics.
- Maxine "Max" Coleman, a Deaf girl and Esther's adoptive younger sister in 2009 horror film Orphan.
- Hearthstone, a deaf elf and one of Magnus's friends from Rick Riordan's Magnus Chase and the Gods of Asgard.
- Regan Abbott, a Deaf daughter of Evelyn & Lee Abbott in 2018 horror film A Quiet Place.
- Jia Andrews, a Deaf girl in 2021 film Godzilla vs. Kong.
- Makkari, an Eternal with superhuman speed in the 2021 film Eternals.

== See also ==
- List of deaf firsts
