= Eby =

Eby or EBY could refer to:

== Places ==
- Eby, Indiana, a town
- Eby, West Virginia

== People ==
=== Given name or nickname ===
- Eby Friedman (born 1957), American electrical engineer and academic
- Eby J. Jose (born 1972), Indian journalist and human rights activist
- Edhie Yudhoyono (born 1980), Indonesian politician

=== Surname ===
- Benjamin Eby (1785–1853), Canadian minister and community leader
- Betsy Eby (born 1967), American painter
- Brooke Eby (born 1988), American businesswoman
- Byron Eby (1904–1990), American football player
- David Eby (born 1976), 37th Premier of British Columbia
- Earl Eby (1894–1970), American athlete
- Guy Eby (1918–2021), American pilot
- Kerr Eby (1889–1946), Canadian illustrator
- Martin K. Eby Jr., American businessman
- Matthew Eby (born 1984), American soccer player
- Moray Eby (1877–1958), American football player

== Other uses ==
- Eby-Brown, American company
- Eby Shoe Corporation buildings
