= Markolf =

Markolf (also spelled as Markolf, Markulf, Marculf or Markholf) is a German given name and surname, literally "march-wulf". Notable people with the name include:

- Marculf (died 558), abbot of Nantus
- Markholf, archbishop of Mainz 1141–1142
- Markolf Niemz (born 1964), German physicist and author
- Stefan Markolf (born 1984), German footballer
- Marcolf, a character in the medieval narrative Solomon and Marcolf

== See also ==
- Markolf.pl, a Polish video game magazine website
