= PFG =

PFG may refer to:

- A PFG - Bulgaria's top-level football league ("A" Professional Football Group); B PFG is the second-level league
- Performance Fishing Gear, a Columbia Sportswear product line
- Performance Food Group, an American Fortune 100 company and food distributor
- Peterson Field Guide - a book series
- Petroleum Facilities Guard - a Libyan oil company and militia
- Principal Financial Group - a publicly traded corporation based in Des Moines, Iowa, USA
- Provident Financial Group - a British sub-prime lender, also described as a "doorstep lender", based in Bradford, England
