= Trnka =

Trnka (feminine Trnková) is a Czech habitational surname, meaning a person who lived by a blackthorn bush, or trnka in Czech. "Trinka" is its Americanized form. Notable people with the surname include:

- Andrea Trnková (born 2004), Czech ice hockey player
- Dobroslav Trnka (1963–2023), Slovak lawyer
- Jaroslav Trnka (born 1983), Czech physicist, one of the authors who introduced amplituhedron
- Jiří Trnka (1912–1969), Czech puppet maker
- Jiří Trnka (footballer) (1926–2005), Czech football player
- Johann Trnka (died 1950), Austrian murderer
- Margareta Trnková-Hanne (born 1976), Czech athlete
- Pavel Trnka (born 1976), Czech ice hockey player
- Věra Trnková (1934–2018), Czech mathematician
- Veronika Trnková (born 1995), Czech volleyball player
- Wenzel Trnka (1739–1791), Bohemian physician
