= Charles Thompson Memorial Hall =

- U.S. National Register of Historic Places
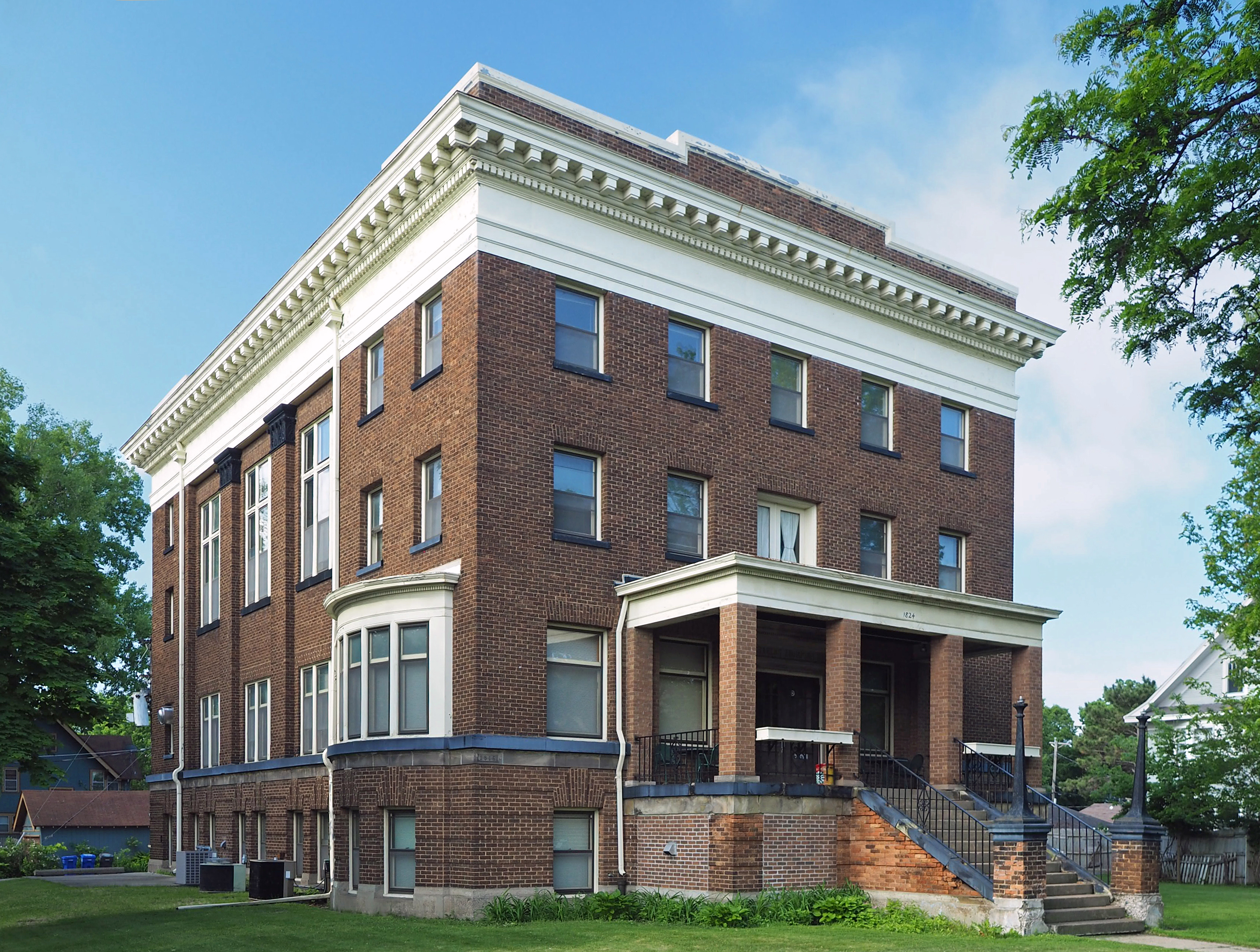
- Charles Thompson Memorial Hall viewed from the northeast

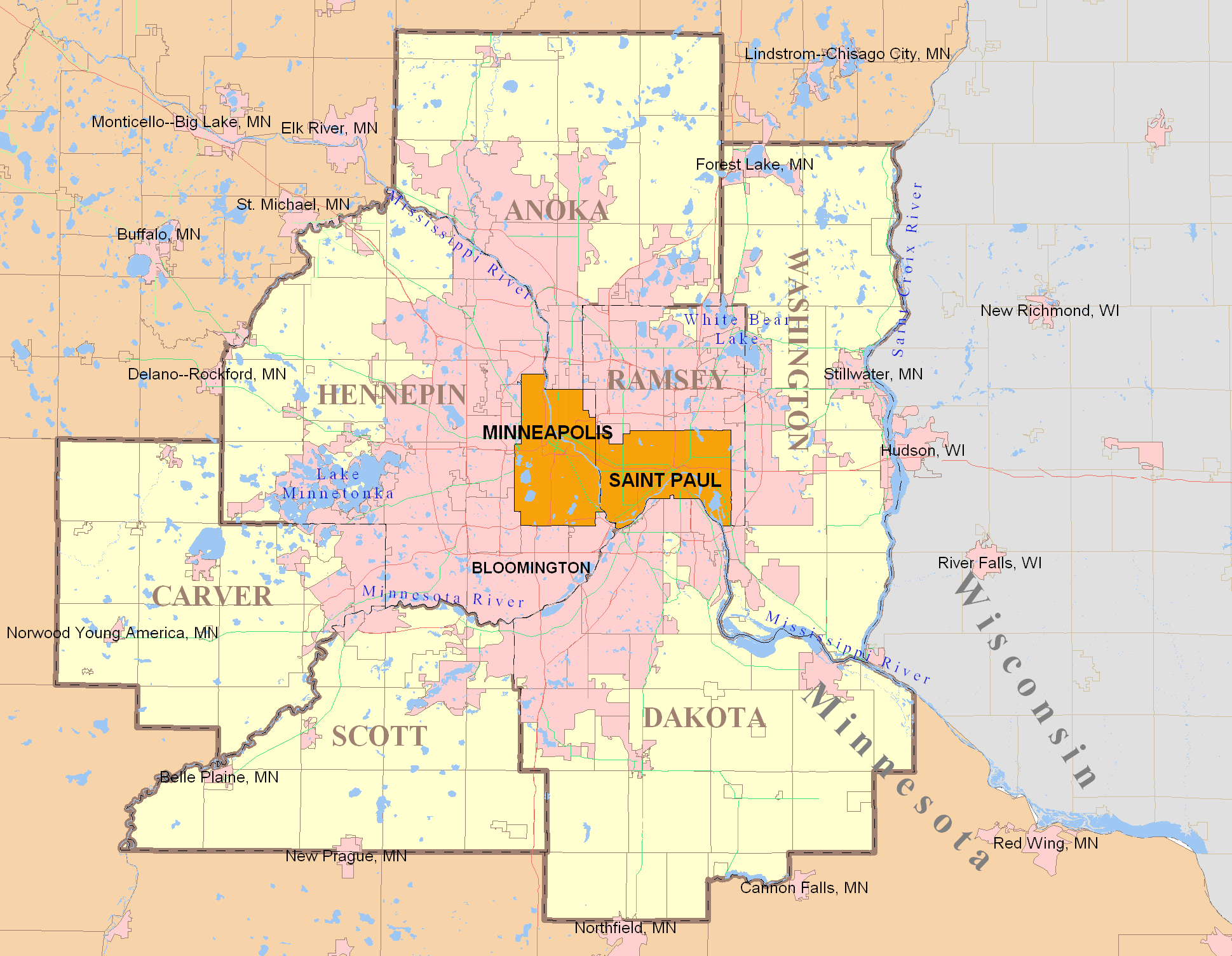
- Location within Minneapolis–Saint Paul Location within Minnesota Location within the United States
- Location: 1824 Marshall Avenue, Saint Paul, Minnesota
- Coordinates: 44°56′53″N 93°10′39″W
- Area: 0.46 acres (0.19 ha)
- Built: 1916
- Architect: Olof Hanson
- Architectural style: Neoclassical
- NRHP reference No.: 11000949
- Added to NRHP: December 22, 2011

Charles Thompson Memorial Hall is a historic clubhouse of Deaf culture in Saint Paul, Minnesota, United States. Built in 1916, it was the first social club in the nation designed exclusively for the deaf.

Charles Thompson Memorial Hall was listed on the National Register of Historic Places in 2011 for its state-level significance in the themes of architecture and social history. It was nominated for being a hub of social and advocacy activity credited with helping foster Minnesota as a preferred location among deaf people.

== Origin ==
Charles Thompson Memorial Hall's origins can be traced back to the Fourth Convention of the Minnesota Association of the Deaf at the Minnesota Institute for Deaf (Deaf and Deafblind), now the Minnesota State Academy for the Deaf, in Faribault, Minnesota in 1896. It was there that Charles Thompson, the son of a wealthy Saint Paul banker, met and fell in love with Margaret Brooks, the daughter of Scottish immigrants to rural Minnesota. Soon after, they married and set up permanent residence in Saint Paul, with a lake home in Alexandria, Minnesota.

The Thompsons owned several properties in and around the Twin Cities that they made available for deaf and hard-of-hearing Minnesotans to meet, camp, or eat together. Their home in Alexandria on Lake Darling became a frequent gathering for many deaf campers that they built permanent cabins on the property.

Charles Thompson died in 1915. Margaret Thompson decided to honor his legacy by using her inherited wealth to hire Olof Hanson, a well-known architect who was himself deaf, to specially design a clubhouse for Minnesota's deaf community. In the early twentieth century, few meeting and event spaces in Minnesota were designed to be accessible to the state's deaf, deafblind, and hard-of-hearing community. At the dedication ceremony in 1916, Margaret laid the cornerstone before a crowd of 500 people. She also announced that she would be placing the building and a $45,000 trust fund (equivalent to $1,331,422 in 2025) in the hands of a board of trustees. By doing so she ensured that the club would always remain free to use for all of the deaf people of Minnesota, regardless of religious or political affiliation.

== Description ==
Along with a large assembly hall, the building featured a bowling alley, a social hall, a maplewood dance floor, and a children's play area. It was outfitted with large windows and ceilings to maximize lighting so that American Sign Language (ASL) signs could be seen clearly and easily. On some nights, new films with closed captioning would be projected onto a curtain on a stage.

== History ==
The Minnesota Association of the Deaf has frequently taken advantage of the space since 1917 to hold their biennial conventions. In 1957, the Memorial Hall began circulating its official newsletter, The Thompson Hall Newsletter, which became the Minnesota Deaf Newsletter in 2002. Along with event listings and other news about the social space, the newsletter offered updates on the Minnesota State Academy for the Deaf in Faribault, the local deaf sports teams, the Minnesota Association of the Deaf, and other news or updates of importance for the deaf, deafblind, and hard-of-hearing community.

The clubhouse has reached several historical milestones in the 21st century. The Charles Thompson Memorial Hall was added to the National Register of Historic Places in 2011, and members celebrated the 100th anniversary of their prized social club in 2016. Members have struggled at times to maintain their space, to keep it accessible to all, and to attract younger members. Despite these difficulties, the Charles Thompson Memorial Hall still stands as a testament to over a century of the collective labors of deaf, deafblind, and hard-of-hearing Minnesotans.

== Gallery ==
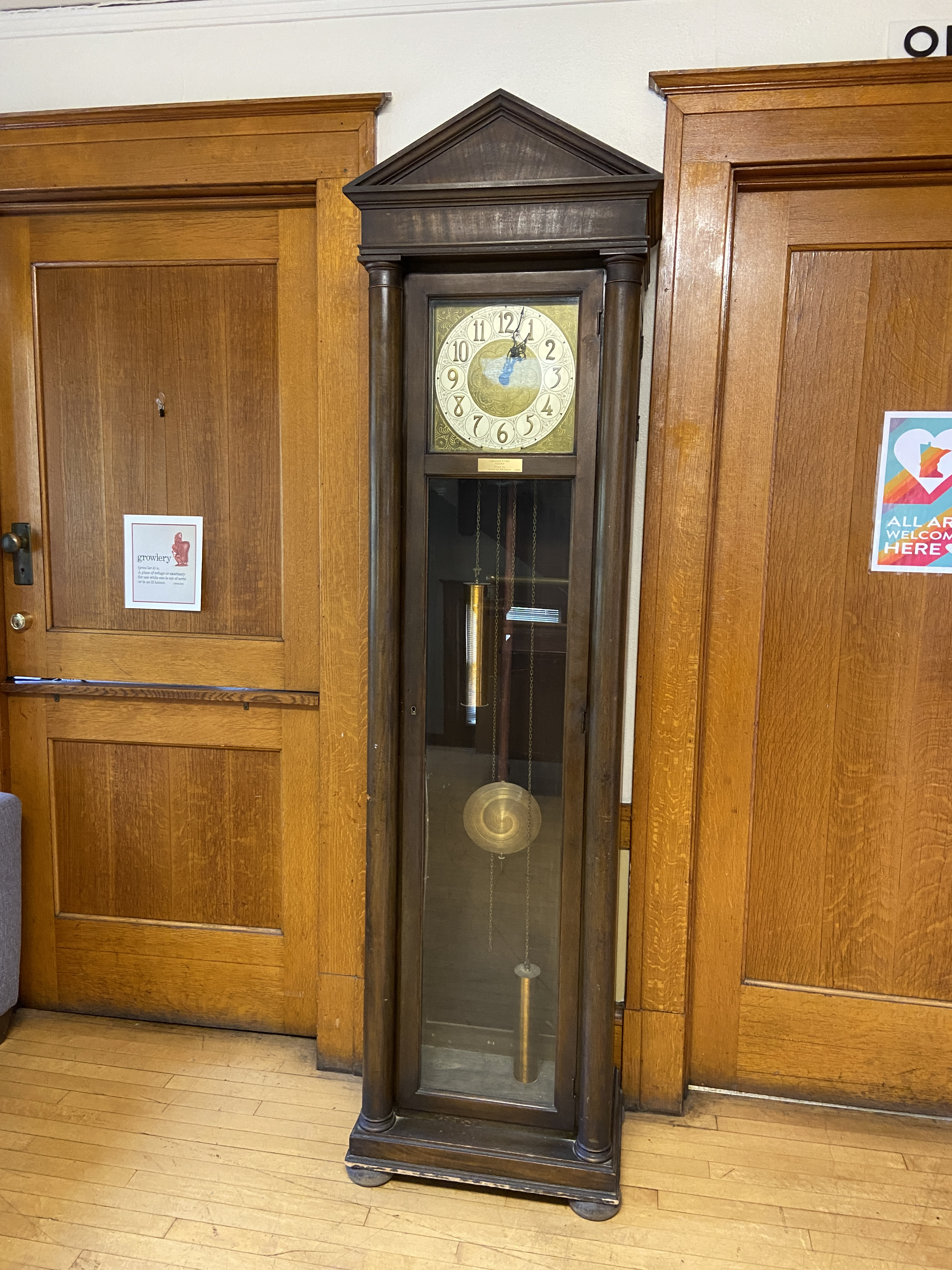
Grandfather clock

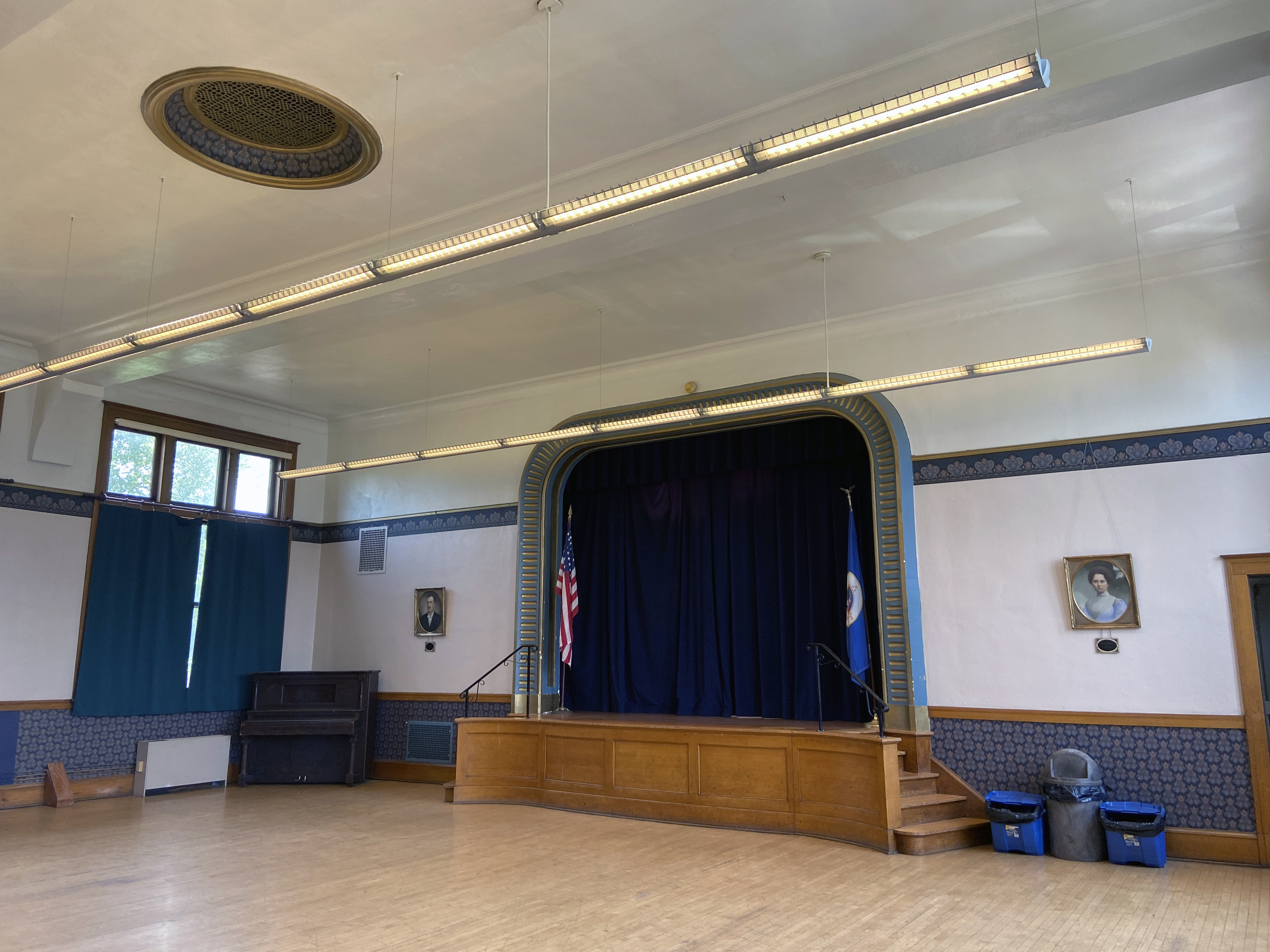
Auditorium

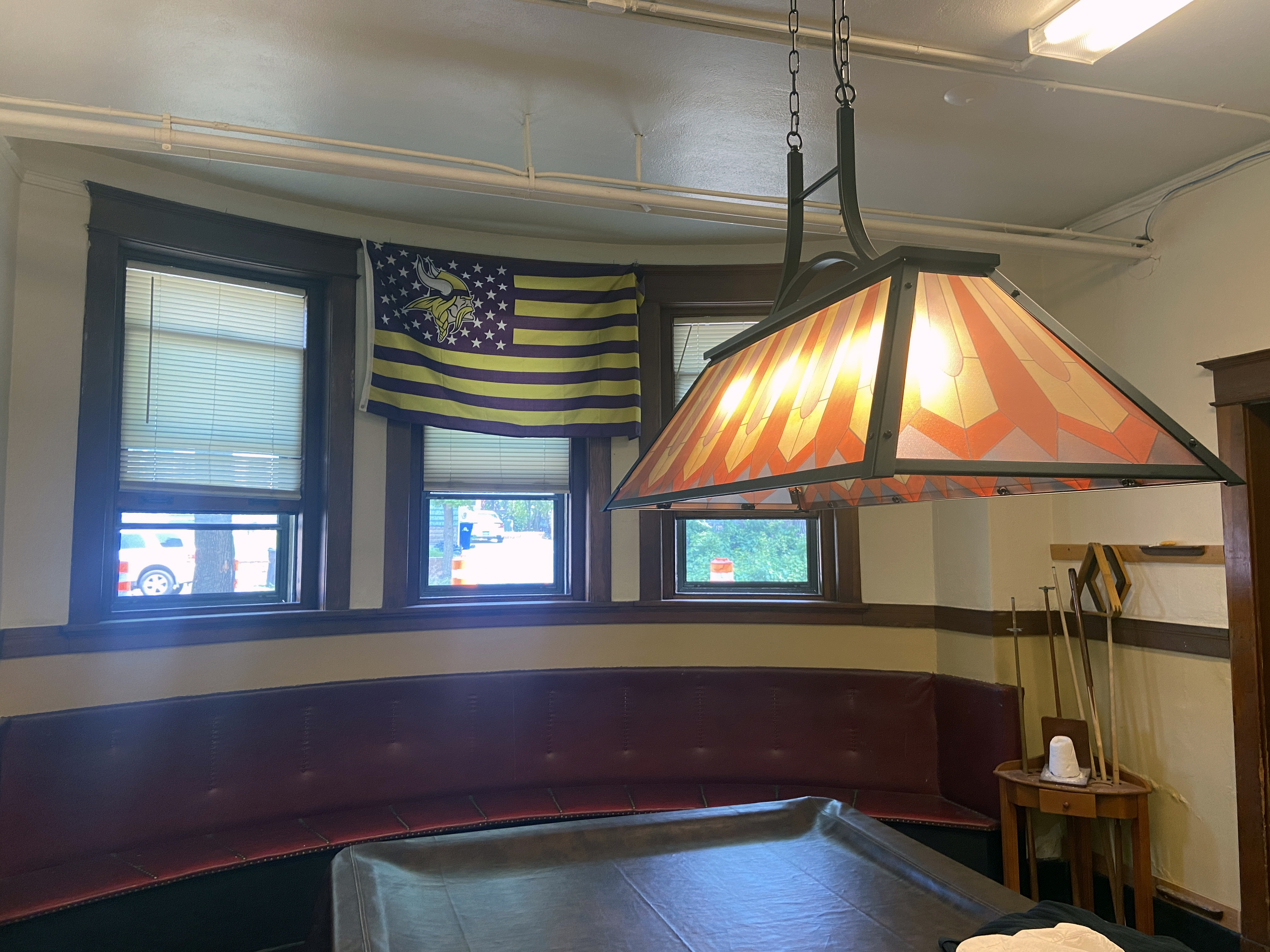
Pool table

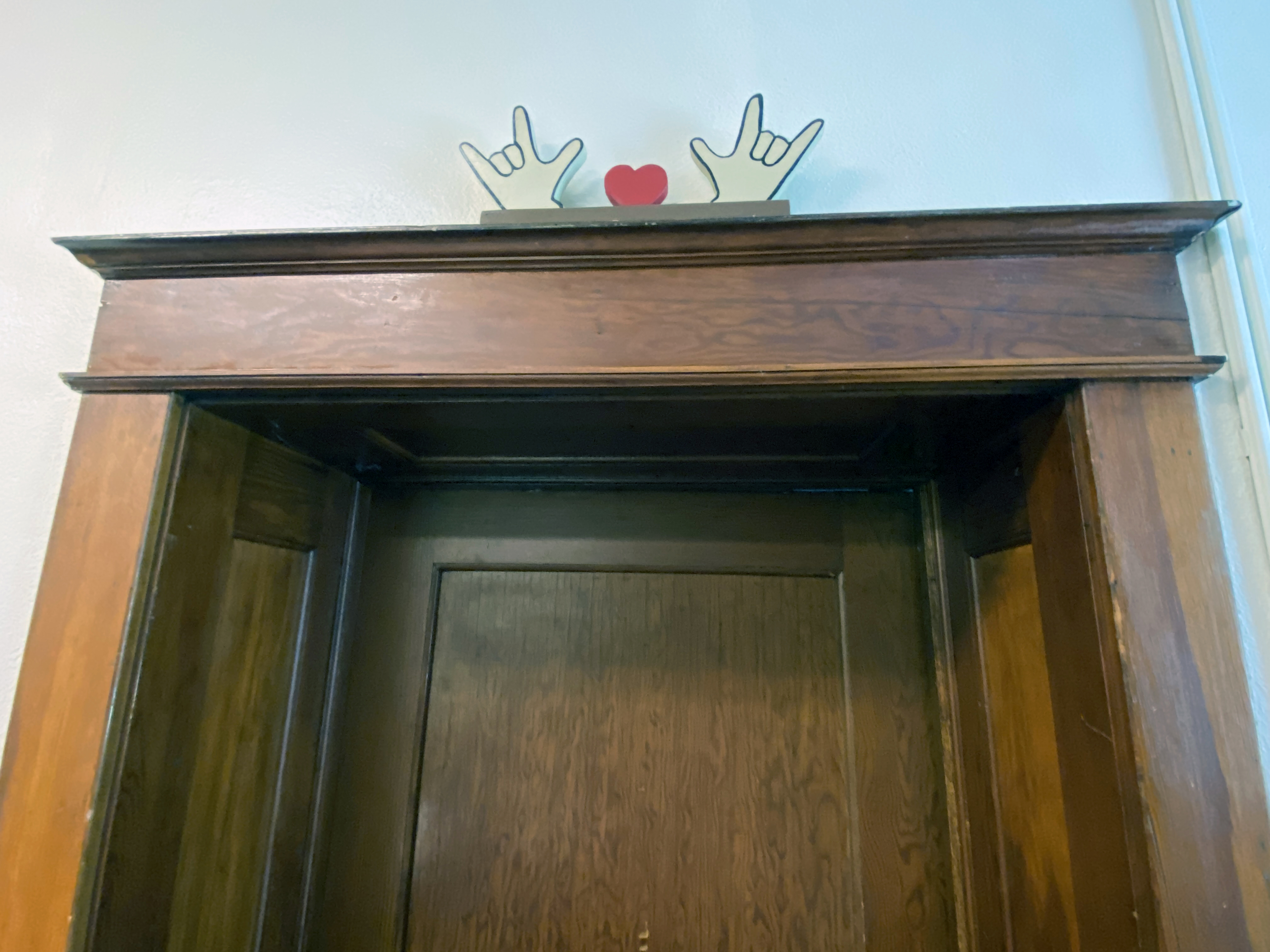
Interior doorway with signing art

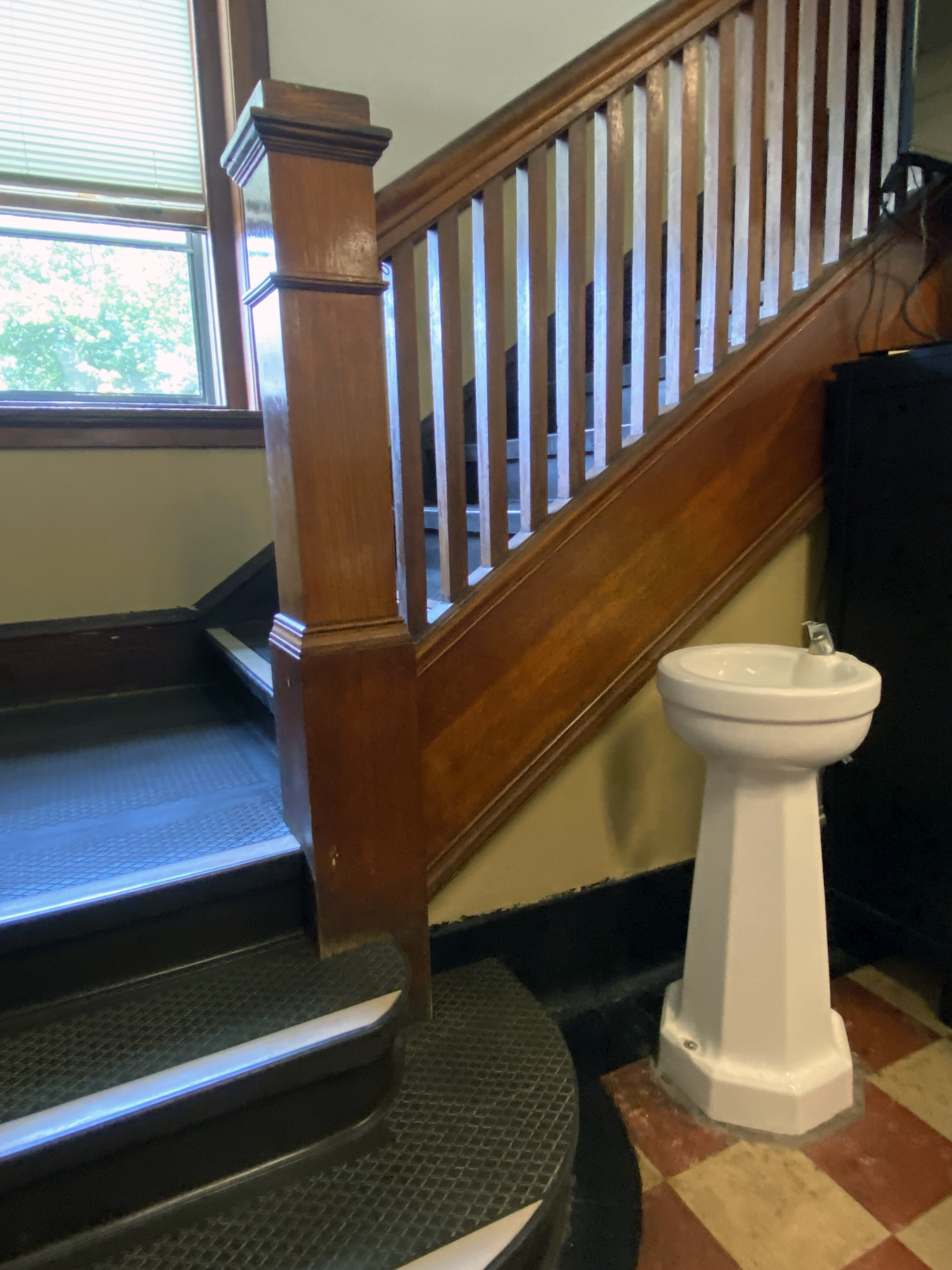
Stairwell and water fountain

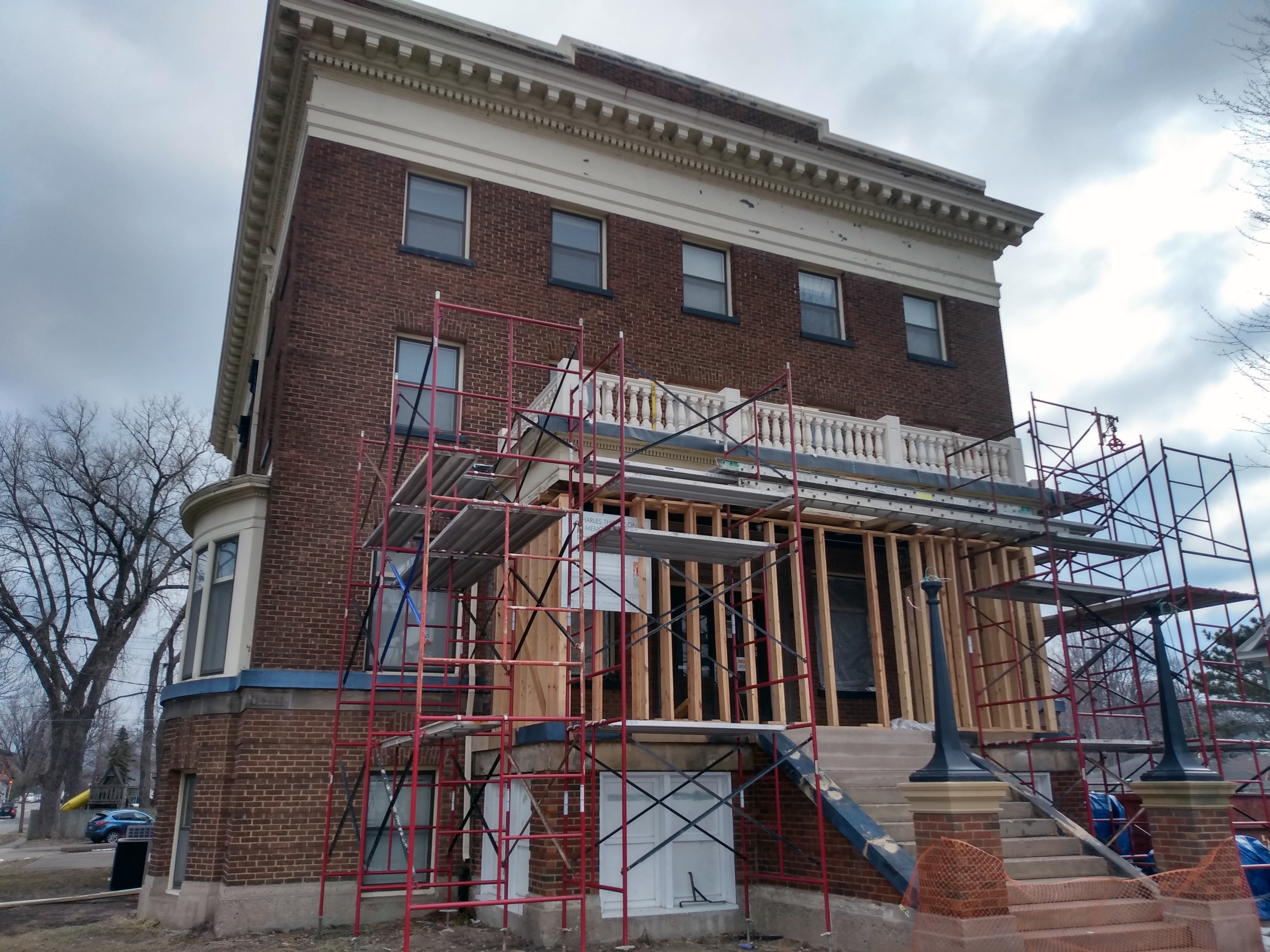
Porch restoration in 2024

== See also ==
- National Register of Historic Places listings in Ramsey County, Minnesota
