= Simon Ollert =

German footballer

Personal information
- Full name: Simon Ollert
- Date of birth: 14 April 1997 (age 29)
- Place of birth: Germany
- Height: 1.82 m (6 ft 0 in)
- Position: Centre-forward

Team information
- Current team: FC Penzberg
- Number: 36

Youth career
- –2012: JFG Ammertal
- 2012–2015: SpVgg Unterhaching
- 2015–2016: FC Ingolstadt

Senior career*
Years	Team	Apps	(Gls)
2014–2015	SpVgg Unterhaching	7	(0)
2016–2017	FC Ingolstadt II	6	(1)
2017–2018	FC Memmingen	11	(0)
2017–2018	FC Memmingen II	13	(3)
2018–2019	SV Pullach	13	(1)
2019–2020	FC Pinzgau Saalfelden	0	(0)
2020–2021	SSV Pfeffenhausen	0	(0)
2022–	FC Penzberg	0	(0)
- * Club domestic league appearances and goals as of 03:32, 10 November 2018 (UTC)

Simon Ollert (born 14 April 1997) is a German footballer who plays as a centre-forward and coach for FC Penzberg.

== Career ==
Ollert made his professional debut for SpVgg Unterhaching in the 3. Liga on 16 September 2014, coming on as a substitute in the 72nd minute for Pascal Köpke in the 1–3 home loss against Arminia Bielefeld.

== Personal life ==
Ollert was born deaf, and wears hearing aids when playing football. He is the second hearing impaired professional footballer in Germany, after Stefan Markolf for Mainz 05.
