= Fjälkinge Church =

- Fjälkinge kyrka
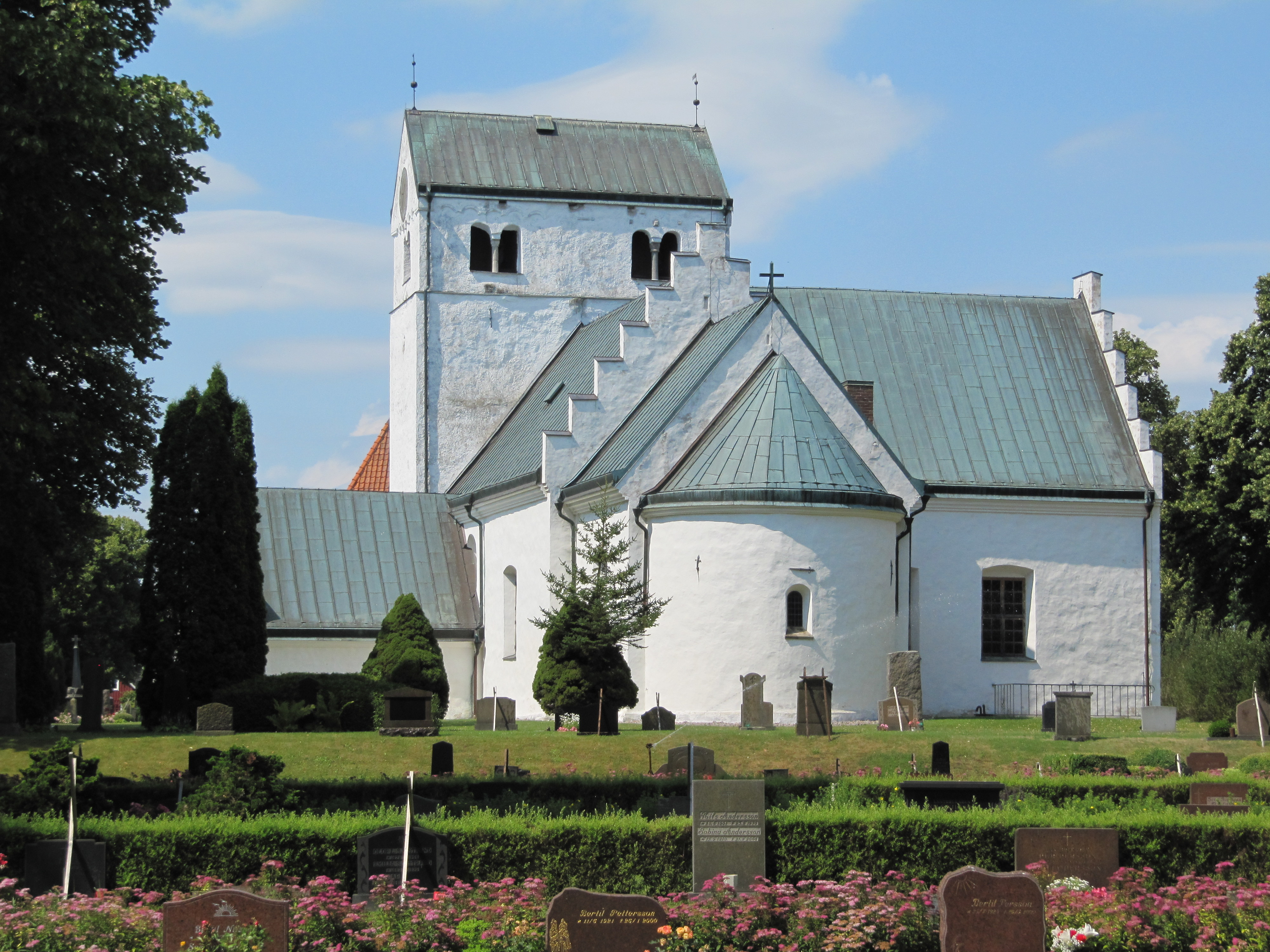
- Fjälkinge Church

- 56°02′15″N 14°16′40″E
- Country: Sweden
- Denomination: Church of Sweden

Administration
- Diocese: Lund

Fjälkinge Church (Swedish: Fjälkinge kyrka) is a medieval church in Fjälkinge, in the province of Skåne, Sweden. Much of the church dates from the 12th century, with additions made later in the Middle Ages. It contains medieval murals which were discovered and restored in 1967. Fjälkinge Church belongs to the Diocese of Lund.

== History and architecture ==
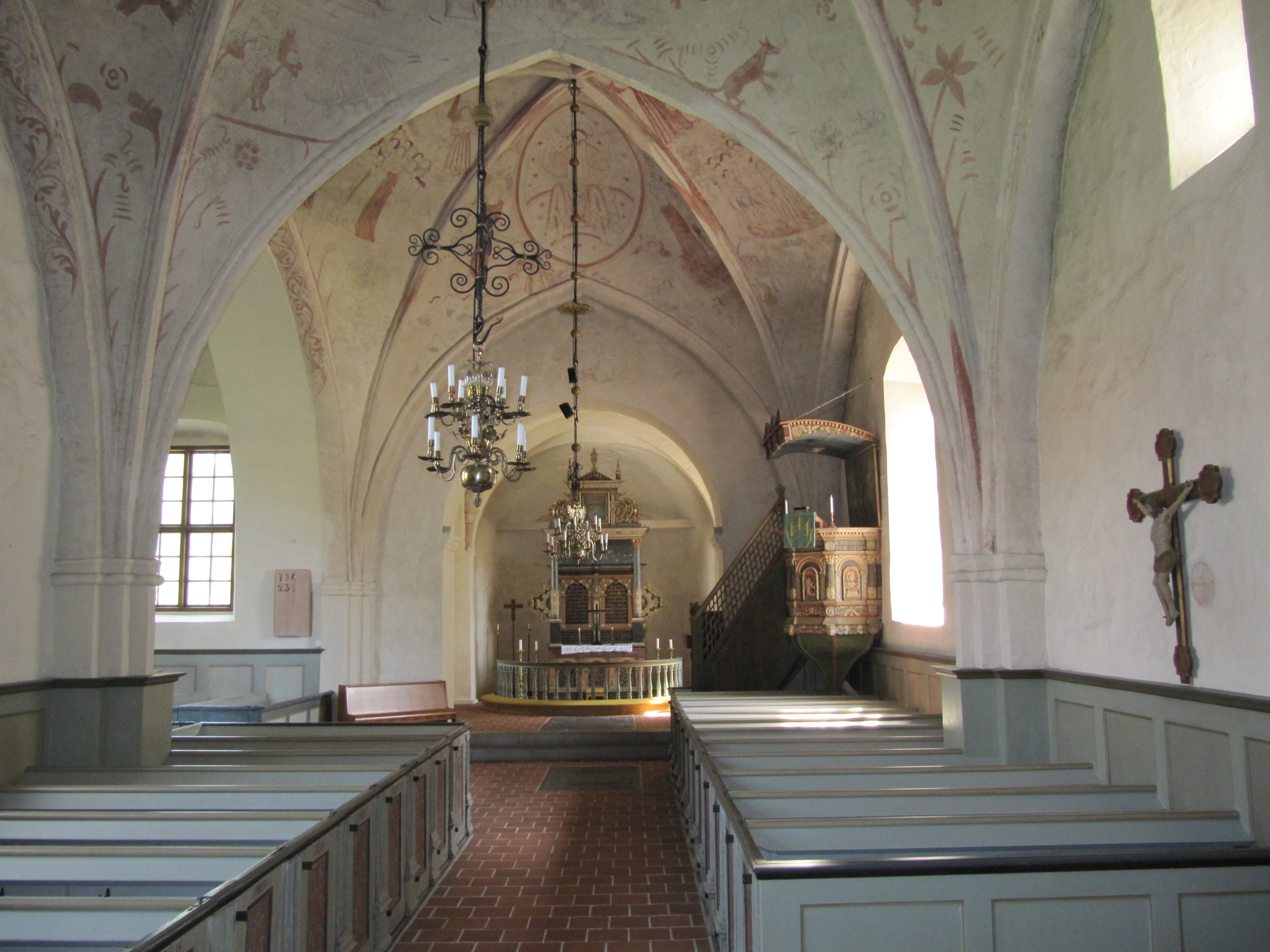
Interior view towards the choir with murals visible

The church was built during the 12th century and preceded by a wooden church built c. 1130 – 1140. The typically broad, Romanesque western tower, the nave, choir and apse all date from the construction period; the tower was built first and possibly as much as fifty years earlier than the rest of the church. The tower has been attributed to one of the master stonemasons working on the construction of Lund Cathedral, Carl stenmästare or possibly the master stonemason responsible for lading the construction at Färlöv Church. The layout of its ground floor suggest that it may have served as a private chapel for a local lord.

The church has been rebuilt and expanded in stages. During the middle of the 13th century, the present vault of the choir was constructed. During the late Middle Ages, church porches were probably constructed both in front of the northern and the southern entrances to the church; only the one in front of the southern entrance is preserved. A northern transept was added in 1763, and a thorough restoration of the church carried out in 1832.

On the cemetery at some distance from the church itself stands another medieval building, probably originally a residential building, which for a long time served as a lychgate.

== Murals ==
During a restoration of the church in 1967, medieval murals were discovered under layers of whitewash on the vaults of the church. They were made c. 1475-1500 by an otherwise unknown artist, occasionally referred to as the Fjälkinge Master. After their discovery, other murals in Skåne have been attributed to this workshop. Other sources however claim that they are by the painter Nils Håkansson, an artist who made the paintings in Vittskövle Church, among others. The paintings depict scenes from the Bible. On the western vault, the creation and the fall of man are depicted, while on the eastern vault the Last Judgment is depicted. The style of the pictures has been described as "naïve".

== Furnishings ==
The oldest item in the church is the Romanesque baptismal font, dating from the 12th century and decorated with imaginary beasts. The altarpiece is from 1604, and the pulpit likewise dates from the beginning of the 17th century.
