= Fjälkinge =

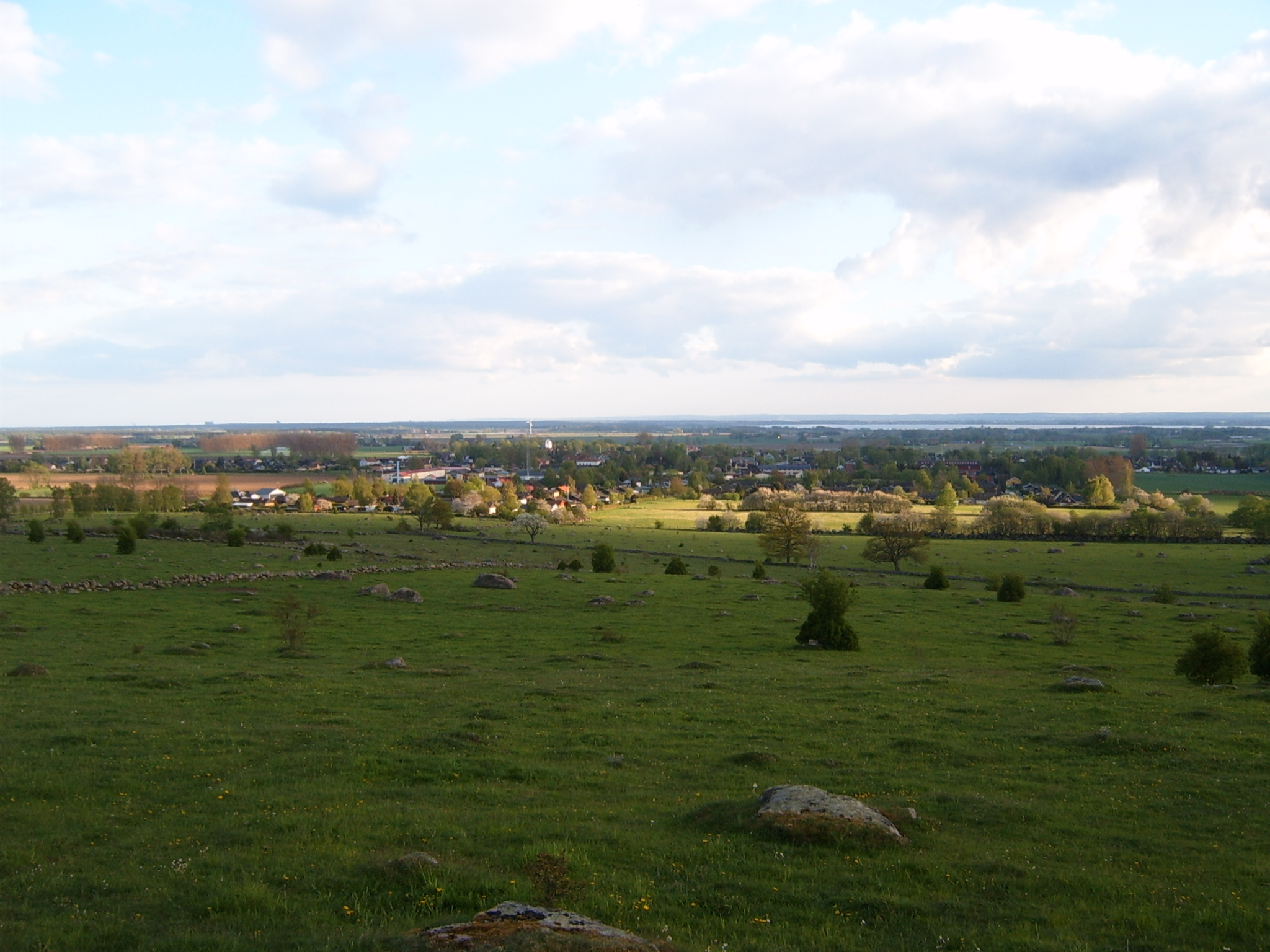

- Location within Skåne Location within Sweden
- Coordinates: 56°03′N 14°17′E
- Country: Sweden
- Province: Skåne
- County: Skåne County
- Municipality: Kristianstad Municipality

Area
  - Total: 1.35 km^{2} (0.52 sq mi)

Population (28 August 2025)
  - Total: 1,900
  - Density: 1,254/km^{2} (3,250/sq mi)
- Time zone: UTC+1 (CET)
  - Summer (DST): UTC+2 (CEST)

Fjälkinge is a locality situated in Kristianstad Municipality, Skåne County, Sweden with 1,690 inhabitants in 2010.

The etymology of the name indicates that the name originally may have meant "steep hill".

Fjälkinge Church is a well-preserved Romanesque church with late medieval frescos.

Olof Hanson, an American architect, was born in Fjälkinge in 1862. His family immigrated to Willmar, Minnesota in 1875.
