= Core-Mark =

American wholesale supply chain services company

Core-Mark Holding Company, Inc.
- Company type: Subsidiary
- Traded as: Nasdaq: CORE
- Founded: 1888; 137 years ago in San Francisco
- Founders: Glaser Brothers
- Headquarters: Westlake, Texas, U.S.
- Area served: North America
- Key people: Chris Hobson (CEO and president)
- Revenue: US$10.281 billion
- Total assets: US$1.029 billion
- Number of employees: 8,413 (2017)
- Parent: Performance Food Group
- Website: core-mark.com

Core-Mark Holding Company, Inc. distributes fresh, chilled and frozen merchandise mainly to convenience stores in the United States. It also provides associated business services such as category management and management of promotions.

== History ==
Core-Mark was started in San Francisco in 1888 by the Glaser brothers. After multi-generational ownership, the Glaser family sold the company to David Gillespie in 1974, who took the company public by listing on the Toronto Stock Exchange with Gerald Pickman COO and Jerry Goldman CFO in 1984. By late 1987, private equity firms were an integral part of the ownership and the company went private in 1989. Core-Mark remained private until June 2002 when it was sold to Fleming Companies, Inc. Less than one year later, in April 2003, Fleming filed for bankruptcy, taking Core-Mark with them. By August 2004, Core-Mark had emerged from the Fleming bankruptcy under the direction of President and CEO J. Michael Walsh. The company went public again in 2005 and was listed on the NASDAQ stock exchange. Walsh remained the CEO until his retirement in January 2013. His successor, Thomas B. Perkins, led the Company until his retirement in June 2018. Scott E. McPherson was appointed the CEO following the retirement of Perkins.

Core-Mark was a marketer of food products to the convenience retail industry in North America. In 2021, when Core-Mark was acquired by Performance Food Group, Core-Mark served 44,000 customer locations in the U.S. and Canada and operated 32 distribution centers with headquarters in Westlake, TX and 8,100 employees throughout North America. Core-Mark serviced convenience retailers including traditional convenience stores as well as grocery stores, big box retailers, drug stores, liquor and specialty stores, and other stores that carry convenience products.
