= DeafSpace =

Architectural approach

DeafSpace is an approach to architecture that is primarily informed by the unique ways in which deaf people live and inhabit space. The design concept can be applied to public and domestic spaces. Buildings, classrooms, hallways, furniture, and other spatial arrangements and technologies can be designed to suit people with hearing impairments and their way of being. Not to be confused with Universal design as it embodies much of Deaf culture as well as providing visual access in its designs.

The modern concept of deaf space utilizes the five principal concepts: sensory reach, space and proximity, mobility and proximity, light and color, and acoustics. It accounts for the visual and hearing abilities of the deaf person while also taking into consideration the visual sign language that they communicate in.

== Modern design ==
The DeafSpace Program was established by architect Hansel Bauman, hbhm architects, when he was commissioned in 2005 by Gallaudet University, the world's first and only university for the deaf. The concept was originally thought to be “visu-centric", generally about visual orientation. However, Hansel Bauman considers the term as an incomplete depiction of the design concept when it validates the expression of identity, eases mobility, and enhances the overall well being of being deaf. Bauman designed his spaces to increase deaf people's access to express sign language and maximize their hearing assistive devices' potential.

"It's a creative, cultural, experimental way of being in the world that has many benefits that we are just now starting to uncover, certainly in the world of architecture." - Hansel Bauman

Currently Bauman is heading the design of DeafSpaces in Gallaudet University. He has designed two buildings from scratch and renovated the living spaces of its dormitories. The first of the buildings, Sorenson Language and Communications Center (SLCC), houses the university's audiology booths and its labs for visual language and learning, a center focused on hearing and the linguistics department. The science classrooms in Gallaudet utilizes unique octagon shaped lab tables with the intention to position the students to view both the teacher and the experiments at the same time.

== Historical adaptations ==
=== Deaf door knocker ===
In the 1877, deaf people would utilize a "deaf door knocker" which involves pulling a knob connected to a heavy lead box, releasing it to make a very loud thud that can be felt across the floor. Gallaudet University's College Hall, originally a boys dormitory, utilized this knocker outside of each boys' room. Today, only one surviving model can be found outside the President's office.

In the 1890s, Olof Hanson, an alumnus thought to be the nation's first deaf architect, designed 54 homes, businesses, churches, and schools. His designs includes the Dawes House on Gallaudet campus, the North Dakota, Mississippi, and Illinois Schools for the Deaf. His designs is considered as the precursor to the DeafSpace principals of open spaces and natural light as his buildings were designed to facilitate visual communication.

=== Adaptations in use ===
People with hearing impairments have found many ways to adapt their living spaces to suit and increase access to their abilities. The adaptations range from electronic to renovations. There have been adaptations of switching the doorbell to blinking lights to alert the occupants of someone at the front door. Renovations involving the removal of walls that obstruct the view from the living room to the second room.

Some adaptations are legally required under the Americans with Disabilities Act which mandates equal access to a fire alarm system in areas that are public. It would require replacing the usual fire alarm with one that has a strobe light.

In educational spaces multiple schools for the deaf have found various ways to adapt their spaces to maximize their efficiency in teaching students with hearing disabilities. The most common adaptation is the seating arrangement in classrooms. Instead of having rows of desks, they are arranged in either a u-shape or circular in order to maximize each student's visual connection to each other. Some schools have installed additional light switches on the presenter's side of the room for the teacher to flick the lights to alert and attract students attention. Others have designed their buildings to have vibration sensitive floors to allow foot tapping to be felt across the room.
