= Kathleen L. Brockway =

American author, historian and deaf rights activist

Kathleen L. "Kat" Brockway is an American author, historian, and deaf rights activist.

== Early life and education ==
Brockway was born in Washington, D.C. Brockway, who is deaf, was adopted. Her family, who did not previously know American Sign Language (ASL), learned ASL Gallaudet University in order to teach Kathleen at home.

Brockway graduated from the Model Secondary School for the Deaf. She later attended Gallaudet University and graduated with a bachelor's degree at the University of Phoenix. In 2022, Brockway graduated with a Master of Arts degree degree in Cultural Sustainability at Goucher College.

Brockway is a doctoral student at Lamar University studying in Deaf Studies with the Department of Deaf Studies and Deaf Education

== Career and advocacy ==
Brockway served as chair of the National Association of the Deaf's Deaf Culture and History section from 2014 to 2017. From 2017 to 2018, she was Deaf History Researcher for the ASL Rose Company, a company that provides deaf-centered educational resources. Brockway worked with the Deaf Cultural Digital Library.

Brockway wrote an introductory booklet for the Shenandoah County Historic Society in honor of their 250th anniversary. The published 28-page booklet was released on March 26, 2022, entitled The Lost Shared Signing Community of Lantz Mills and Shenandoah County, Virginia.

Brockway coordinated a plan with the Lantz Mills booklet in honor of the Shenandoah County's 250th anniversary celebration of deaf awareness month, which was hosted by the Library of Virginia and Shenandoah County Public Library and released a pop-up traveling display about Lantz Mill on September 8, 2022.

In April 2026, Brockway published "Bridging Two Counties: Deaf Lives in a Shared Signing Community," on pages 4–6 in Rocktown History, a publication of the Harrisonburg-Rockingham Historical Society. The issue also identifies Brockway as a doctoral student at Lamar University in Beaumont, Texas, as well as a Deaf historian and author. The article was based on a presentation she gave to the society on January 15, 2026; a recording of the presentation is available on YouTube.

== Publications ==
Brockway worked as a consultant to the Virginia's Deaf Culture Digital Library project to identify a variety of contemporary and historical references to Deaf historical sites throughout the state of Virginia. The map is viewable here.

Brockway has written two books; Baltimore's Deaf Heritage (2014), and Detroit's Deaf Heritage (2016). She was the first deaf author published by Arcadia Publishing as part of their Images of America series.

== Awards ==
Brockway was inducted into the Susan Daniels Disability Mentoring Hall of Fame in 2016. She was awarded the John H. Adamson Excellence in Presentation for publishing her research on the Lantz Mill Deaf Village.
