= Olof Hanson (architect) =

American architect (1862–1933)

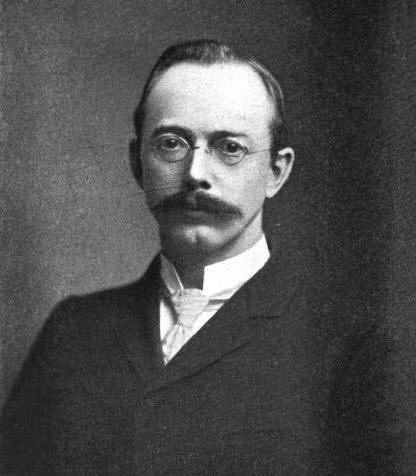
- Born: Olof Hanson; September 10, 1862; Fjälkinge, Sweden
- Died: September 8, 1933 (aged 70) (United States) Seattle, Washington, USA
- Occupation: first Deaf American architect.

Olof Hanson (September 10, 1862 – September 8, 1933) was a Deaf Swedish American architect.

== Background ==
Olof Hanson was born in Fjälkinge, Skåne County, Sweden. His father was a well-to-do farmer, county official, and railroad director. In 1874, the family had made arrangements to go to America, where a farm had been purchased. But his father was taken sick and died, and the trip was postponed till the following year, when they came to the United States and settled near Willmar, Minnesota. Olof lost his hearing two weeks after coming to the country.

Before becoming deaf he attended public schools in Sweden. In 1878, he entered the Minnesota School for the Deaf at Faribault, and graduated in 1881. Then he entered Gallaudet College at Washington and graduated in 1886 at the head of the second largest class in the history of the college up to that time.

== Career ==
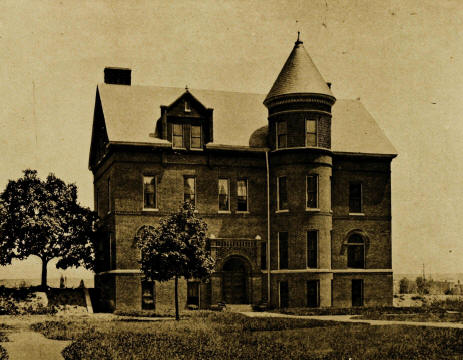
Boys dormitory building designed by Olof Hanson

After graduating he entered the office of Hodgson & Son, architects, Minneapolis, and remained with this firm in their Minneapolis and Omaha offices until 1889, when he made a trip to Europe for professional study. About ten months were spent abroad, during which he visited England, Scotland, France, Italy, Switzerland, Germany, Denmark, Sweden and Norway. Returning in 1890, he secured a position with Wilson Bros. & Co., Philadelphia, who were then making plans for the new Pennsylvania School for the Deaf at Mt. Airy, and for nearly a year he was engaged on the plans for these extensive buildings.

In 1891, he returned to Minnesota and worked at his profession in Duluth and Minneapolis. For about two years he taught in the school for the deaf at Faribault. But, being resolved to follow his chosen profession of architecture, he opened an office in Faribault, where he was engaged in business on his own account for about three years. Among the buildings erected from his plans are: The North Dakota School for the Deaf; a boys' dormitory building at the Kendall school, Washington, D. C.; one building for the State School for Feeble-minded at Faribault; residences for Dr. J. L. Noyes, Faribault, for Mr. J. C. Howard, Duluth, and half a dozen others in Faribault and elsewhere; also six brick stores and business blocks in Faribault and other places; and a hotel for the Orinoco company in Venezuela. He engaged on a public school building for the city of Faribault, which was won in competition with about twenty architects.

Hanson also designed Charles Thompson Memorial Hall in Saint Paul, Minnesota. The hall has wide hallways which allows signers to see each other and communicate more clearly, an early example of DeafSpace.

Hanson's papers were donated to the University Archives of Gallaudet University. Some of his papers are also located at the Rice County Historical Society, Faribault, Minnesota. There is also some other archival information on Hanson at the Northwest Architectural Archives, University of Minnesota. The University of Washington, Department of Special Collections, has material on Hanson related to his work in the UW Department of Buildings and Grounds.

Hanson served as President of the National Association of the Deaf of the United States (NAD) from 1910 to 1913.

== Personal life ==
Olof Hanson married Agatha Tiegel whom he had met at the Minnesota Institute for the Deaf, where she was a deaf teacher. Agatha Tiegel was the first female graduate of Gallaudet University's full program, with a B.A. in 1893. Together they were the parents of three daughters: Marion F. (born c. 1901 in MN), Alice C. (born c. 1905 in WA) and Helen (born c. 1907 in WA).

== See also ==
- List of American architects

== Other sources ==
- Anderson, Dennis; Dietz, Duane; Ochsner, Jeffrey, Karl Shaping Seattle Architecture (University of Washington Press. 1994)

== Biographical information ==
- Biographical information was quoted from the public domain book: Representative Deaf Persons of the United States of America (ed. by James E. Gallager, 1898, pp. 109–112)

Cultural offices
| Preceded by George Veditz | President of the National Association of the Deaf (United States); 1910-1913 | Succeeded by Jay C. Howard |
