= Eby Friedman =

American engineer

Eby G. Friedman
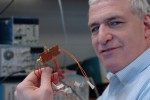
- Friedman in 2008
- Born: 10 August 1957 (age 69); Jersey City, New Jersey
- Education: Lafayette College; University of California, Irvine
- Awards: IEEE Fellow; IEEE CAS Charles A. Desoer Technical Achievement Award; Fulbright Scholar; University of California, Irvine Engineering Hall of Fame; IEEE CAS Mac Van Valkenburg Award; National Academy of Inventors (NAI)
- Scientific career
- Fields: Electrical and Computer Engineering
- Workplaces: University of Rochester; Technion – Israel Institute of Technology; Hughes Aircraft Company
- Doctoral advisor: James H. Mulligan, Jr.
- Website: www.ece.rochester.edu/~friedman

Eby G. Friedman is an electrical engineer, and Distinguished Professor of Electrical and Computer Engineering at the University of Rochester. Friedman is also a visiting professor at the Technion - Israel Institute of Technology. He is a Senior Fulbright Fellow and a Fellow of the IEEE.

== Early life and education ==
Born in Jersey City, New Jersey, in 1957, he earned an electrical engineering baccalaureate degree from Lafayette College in 1979, a master's degree (1981) and a doctoral degree (1989) from the University of California, Irvine, also in electrical engineering. Friedman graduated from Henry Snyder High School in Jersey City, New Jersey in 1975. Friedman married his wife Laurie in 1984, and they have two sons.

== Career ==
Friedman's research interests include integrated circuits, VLSI design and analysis, clock synchronization, power delivery, 3-D integration, superconductive single flux quantum circuits, and mixed-signal circuits.

His career began in the Netherlands in 1978, working at Philips Gloeilampen Fabreiken on designing bipolar differential amplifiers. From 1979 to 1991 he worked at Hughes Aircraft Company, developing a large variety of integrated circuits for US military and commercial applications. He joined the Electrical and Computer Engineering faculty at the University of Rochester in 1991.

Friedman became a Fellow of the IEEE in 2000 and a Fulbright Scholar (at the Technion in Israel) in 2001. He received the 2005 William H. Riker University Award for Graduate Teaching at the University of Rochester. In 2012 he became a Distinguished Lecturer of the IEEE CAS Society, and in 2013, he was awarded the Charles A. Desoer Technical Achievement Award. In October 2015, he was inducted into the University of California, Irvine, Engineering Hall of Fame. He received the IEEE CAS Mac Van Valkenburg award in 2018. He was appointed National Sun Yat-sen University Honorary Chair Professor in 2019. He received the University of Rochester Hajim Lifetime Achievement Award in 2024. Friedman was elected in 2024 as a Fellow in the National Academy of Inventors.

=== Service ===
==== Editing ====
Friedman is a member of the editorial board of the Journal of Low Power Electronics and Applications. He is a past editor-in-chief and chair of the steering committee for the IEEE Transactions on Very Large Scale Integration (VLSI) Systems, past editor-in-chief of the Microelectronics Journal, as well as past regional editor of the Journal of Circuits, Systems and Computers. He formerly served as a member of several editorial boards: Analog Integrated Circuits and Signal Processing, Journal of VLSI Signal Processing,, Proceedings of the IEEE and IEEE Transactions on Circuits and Systems II: Analog and Digital Signal Processing.

==== Committee work ====
Friedman has served multiple IEEE societies and committees: Circuits and Systems (CAS) Society Board of Governors and CAS liaison to the Solid-State Circuits Society (SSCS); past chair of the VLSI Systems and Applications Circuits and Systems Society Technical Committee; and past chair of the Electron Devices Chapter of the Rochester Section.

==== Selected workshops and conferences ====
He was General/Program/Technical Co-chair, for the 1997 International Workshop on Clock Distribution Networks. He has also chaired the following IEEE events: the 2000 Workshop on Signal Processing Systems, the 2003 and 2004 IEEE International Workshop on System-on-Chip for Real-Time Applications, technical program chair of the 2004 IEEE International Conference on Electronics, Circuits, and Systems, the 2006 IEEE International Symposium on Circuits and Systems, and the 2007 IEEE International Symposium on Networks on Chip (NoC).

== Publications and patents ==
Friedman has published more than 600 papers and is co-inventor of 29 patents.

=== Books ===
- Clock Distribution Networks in VLSI Circuits and Systems (IEEE Press, 1995)
- High Performance Clock Distribution Networks (Kluwer Academic Publishers, 1997)
- Analog Design Issues in Digital VLSI Circuits and Systems (Kluwer Academic Publishers, 1997)
- Timing Optimization through Clock Skew Scheduling (Kluwer Academic Publishers, 2000 and Springer Science+Business Media 2009), first and second edition
- On-Chip Inductance in High Speed Integrated Circuits (Kluwer Academic Publishers, 2001)
- Power Distribution Networks in High Speed Integrated Circuits (Kluwer Academic Publishers, 2004)
- Multi-Voltage CMOS Circuit Design (John Wiley & Sons Press, 2006)
- Power Distribution Networks with On-Chip Decoupling Capacitors (Springer Verlag, 2008 and 2011), first and second edition
- Three-Dimensional Integrated Circuit Design (Morgan Kaufmann, 2009 and 2017), first and second edition
- High Performance Integrated Circuit Design (McGraw-Hill Publishers, 2012)
- On-Chip Power Delivery and Management (Springer, 2016)
- Single Flux Quantum Integrated Circuit Design (Springer, 2022 and 2024), first and second edition
- Graphs in VLSI (Springer, 2023)

=== Selected articles ===
- I. Vaisband, B. Price, S. Kose, Y. Kolla, E. G. Friedman, and J. Fischer, "Distributed LDO Regulators in a 28 nm Power Delivery System," Analog Integrated Circuits and Signal Processing, Volume 83, Issue 3, pp. 295 – 309, 2015.
- I. Vaisband and E. G. Friedman, "Energy Efficient Clustering of On-Chip Power Delivery Systems," Integration, the VLSI Journal, Volume 48, pp. 1 – 9, 2015.
- S. Kvatinsky, N. Wald, G. Satat, E. G. Friedman, A. Kolodny, and U. C. Weiser, "Memristor-Based Material Implication (IMPLY) Logic: Design Principles and Methodologies," IEEE Transactions on Very Large Scale Integration (VLSI) Systems, Vol. 22, No. 10, pp. 2054–2066, October 2014.
- A. Shapiro and E. G. Friedman, "MOS Current Mode Logic Near Threshold Circuits," Journal on Low Power Electronics and Applications, Volume 4, pp. 138 – 152, 2014.
- R. Patel, E. Ipek, and E. G. Friedman, "2T - 1R STT-MRAM Memory Cells for Enhanced Sense Margin and On/Off Current Ratio," Microelectronics Journal, Volume 45, Issue 2, pp. 133 – 143, February 2014.
- S. Kvatinsky, Y. H. Nacson, Y. Etsion, E. G. Friedman, A. Kolodny, and U. C. Weiser, "Memristor-Based Multithreading," IEEE Computer Architecture Letters, Vol. 13, No. 1, pp. 41 – 44, January–June 2014.
- Friedman, Eby G. "Clock distribution networks in synchronous digital integrated circuits." Proceedings of the IEEE 89.5 (2001): 665–692.
- Ismail, Yehea, and Eby G. Friedman. "Effects of inductance on the propagation delay and repeater insertion in VLSI circuits." Very Large Scale Integration (VLSI) Systems, IEEE Transactions on 8.2 (2000): 195–206.
- Ismail, Yehea, Eby G. Friedman, and Jose L. Neves. "Figures of merit to characterize the importance of on-chip inductance." Very Large Scale Integration (VLSI) Systems, IEEE Transactions on 7.4 (1999): 442–449.
- Hauryla, Mikhail, et al. "On-chip optical interconnect roadmap: challenges and critical directions." Selected Topics in Quantum Electronics, IEEE Journal of12.6 (2006): 1699–1705.
