= Marie-Paule Miller =

French athletics competitor

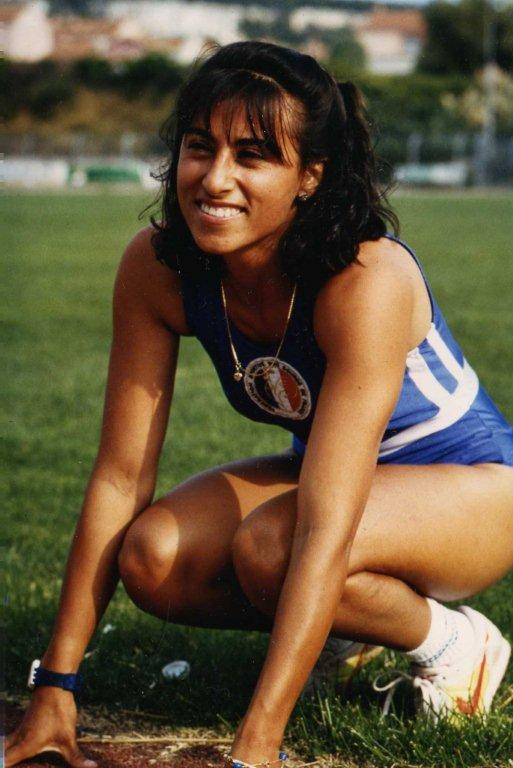
- Miller in 1993

Personal information
- Nationality: French
- Born: April 7, 1968 (age 58) Salon-de-Provence, France
- Years active: 1989–1996
- Height: 1.61 m (5 ft 3 in)
- Weight: 53 kg (117 lb)

Sport
- Country: France
- Coached by: Jean-Philippe Torro
Medal record
Representing France
Deaflympics
Gold medal – first place	Sofia 1993	Heptathlon

Marie-Paule Miller (born 7 April 1968) is a former French female deaf sprinter and heptathlete. She made her Deaflympic debut at the 1993 Summer Deaflympics which was also her only appearance in the Deaflympics event.

In the 1993 Summer Deaflympics, she took part in the women's 200m and women's heptathlon events representing France at the Deaflympics in her only opportunity to represent the nation at a multi-sport event. She claimed gold medal in the women's heptathlon event as a part of the 1993 Summer Deaflympics with an aggregate points of 3910, which also ended up as the only medal that was claimed by her in her Deaflympic career.
