= Markolf.pl =

Polish video game website

- Available in: Polish
- Founder: Marek Matuła
- Chairperson: Tadeusz Wawszczak
- Commercial: Yes
- Registration: Optional
- Launched: 2001

Markolf.pl is a Polish website which specialises in Polish video game magazines. The service has been operating since 2001.

== History ==
Markolf was created in 2001, being the first Polish website to deal with the topic of full versions of games added to video game magazines. The times of the website's splendour came in the first years of its operation, when it was one of the most popular Polish video game sites. Thanks to its reputation, the portal cooperated informally with journalists or representatives of video game magazines (such as CD-Action, Play, or Click!), who gave their input on the site's discussion forum or organised so-called leaks on it. In 2008, Markolf started cooperation with the Gaminator.pl portal belonging to Filmweb. Since 2011, the website has been cooperating with Gram.pl as part of the Collective Programme.

The importance of the service was steadily diminishing with the decline in the popularity of the video game press. Tentative attempts to expand the website's operations (e.g. by aggregating promotions from digital distribution) did not bring about much result.
