= Performance Food Group =

American food distribution company

Performance Food Group Company
- Company type: Public
- Traded as: NYSE: PFGC; S&P 400 component
- Founded: 1885; 141 years ago
- Founder: Robert Sledd
- Headquarters: Richmond, Virginia, U.S.
- Key people: George Holm (chairman, president & CEO); James Hope (EVP & CFO)
- Products: Prepackaged meals and frozen foods, fresh produce
- Services: Foodservice distributor
- Revenue: ▲US$63.298 billion (2025)
- Operating income: ▼US$816 million (2025)
- Net income: ▼US$340 million (2025)
- Total assets: ▲US$17.881 billion (2025)
- Total equity: ▲US$4.472 billion (2025)
- Number of employees: 43,000 (2025)
- Website: www.pfgc.com

Performance Food Group Company (PFG) is an American food service distributor. It is the third-largest food service distributor in the U.S., after Sysco and US Foods. The company supplies 250,000 products to 300,000 locations including independent restaurants, chain restaurants, healthcare, hospitality, and educational institutions. It has 155 distribution centers.

It has three divisions: Foodservice, which distributes food products to restaurants (53% of 2025 revenues); Convenience, which distributes food products to convenience and grocery stores (39% of 2025 revenues); and Specialty, which distributes candy, snacks, and beverages (8% of 2025 revenues).

The company is ranked 80th on the Fortune 500 and 1129th on the Forbes Global 2000.

== History ==
The company traces its roots to a business founded by James Capers in 1885 in Richmond, Virginia. It later became Pocahontas Foods.

The company became Performance Food Group in 1987.

In 2008, the company was acquired by investment funds managed by Wellspring Capital Management and Blackstone Inc. for $1.3 billion and it was merged with Vistar and Roma Foods.

In October 2015, the company became a public company via an initial public offering.

In May 2017, Blackstone sold its remaining stake in the company.

=== Acquisitions ===
#	Year	Company	Description	Ref(s).
1	July 2001	Springfield Foodservice Corp.	Price was $85 million	
2	April 2019	Eby-Brown		
3	July 2019	Reinhart Foodservice	Price was $2 billion; seller was Reyes Holdings	
4	September 2021	Core-Mark	Price was $2.5 billion	
5	October 2024	Cheney Brothers	Price was $2.1 billion in cash	
