= Eby, West Virginia =

Unincorporated community in West Virginia, United States

Eby
- Unincorporated community
- Location within the state of West Virginia Eby (the United States)
- Coordinates: 39°19′08″N 79°53′57″W
- Country: United States
- State: West Virginia
- County: Taylor
- Elevation: 1,404 ft (428 m)
- Time zone: UTC-5 (Eastern (EST))
  - Summer (DST): UTC-4 (EDT)
- GNIS ID: 1549666

Eby is an unincorporated community in Taylor County, West Virginia, United States.
