= Martin K. Eby Jr. =

Martin K. Eby Jr. was Chairman of the Board of The Eby Corporation (a commercial general contractor holding company), Wichita, Kansas, from April 1979 until his retirement in July 2004. Mr. Eby was also President and Chief Executive Officer of The Eby Corporation from June 1967 to December 1997.
