= Markolf Niemz =

German biophysicist and author (born 1964)

Markolf H. Niemz
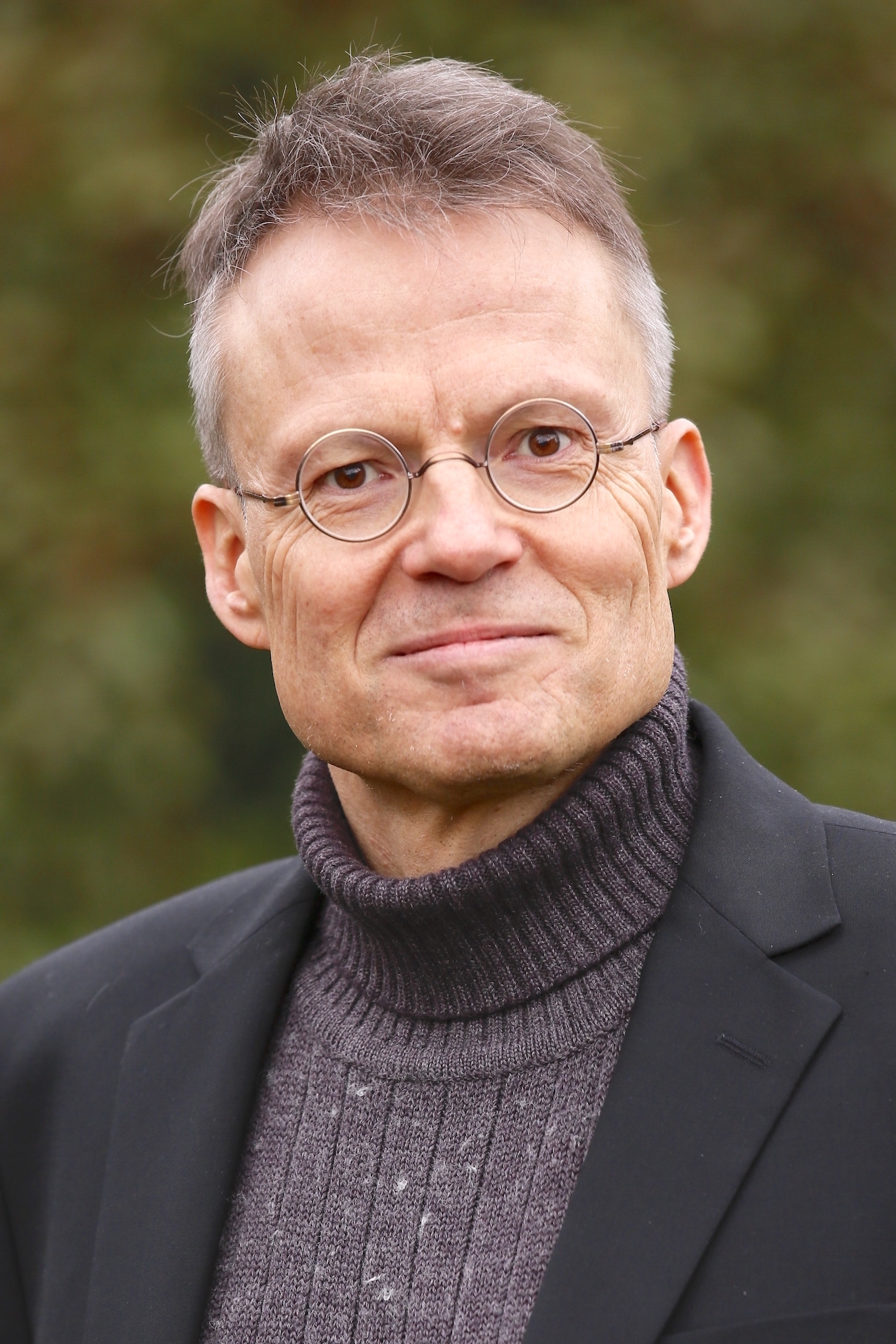
- Markolf H. Niemz, PhD (2019)
- Known for: Physics & Philosophy, Laser–Tissue Interactions
- Awards: Karl-Freudenberg-Prize (1995), Research Fellow at Harvard Medical School (1995)
- Scientific career
- Fields: Physics, Bioengineering, Biophysics
- Workplaces: Heidelberg University, Germany
- Website: https://www.markolfniemz.de/en

Markolf H. Niemz (born 1964 in Hofheim am Taunus) is a German physicist, biophysicist, and author. He is a full professor at Heidelberg University.

== Biography and Work ==
Markolf Niemz studied physics at Frankfurt University and Heidelberg University, and bioengineering at the University of California, San Diego. In 1992, he received his PhD with a thesis on the construction of a pulse compressed Nd:YLF laser to study the plasma-induced ablation of tissue. In 1995, he was a Research Fellow at Harvard Medical School with a grant from the German Research Foundation.

Niemz worked as head of the Optical Spectroscopy department at the Fraunhofer Institute for Physical Measurement Techniques (IPM) in Freiburg until 1999. In 2000, he has been appointed the Chair of Medical Engineering/Biomedical Engineering at Heidelberg University, settled as a full professor at the Medical Faculty of Mannheim. Since then, Niemz has been director of the Mannheim Biomedical Engineering Laboratories (MABEL), a joint venture of Heidelberg University and the Mannheim University of Applied Sciences. His research focuses on light and matter, biosignals, and the foundations of physics. He was the first scientist worldwide to apply ultrashort laser pulses to dentistry for a pain-free treatment of caries.

== Philosophical and Religious Thoughts ==
Niemz also addresses a new branch of mortality research, the so-called near-death experiences. With his scientific novel Lucy mit c (Books on Demand, 2005), he became well known to a wide audience for comparing near-death experiences with effects in Albert Einstein's theory of relativity. Niemz comes up with a new, physical explanation of near-death experiences: The so-called "searchlight effect" makes us perceive a dark tunnel with a bright light at the other end. Light itself is cosmic memory and provides the life review that is frequently reported by the dying.

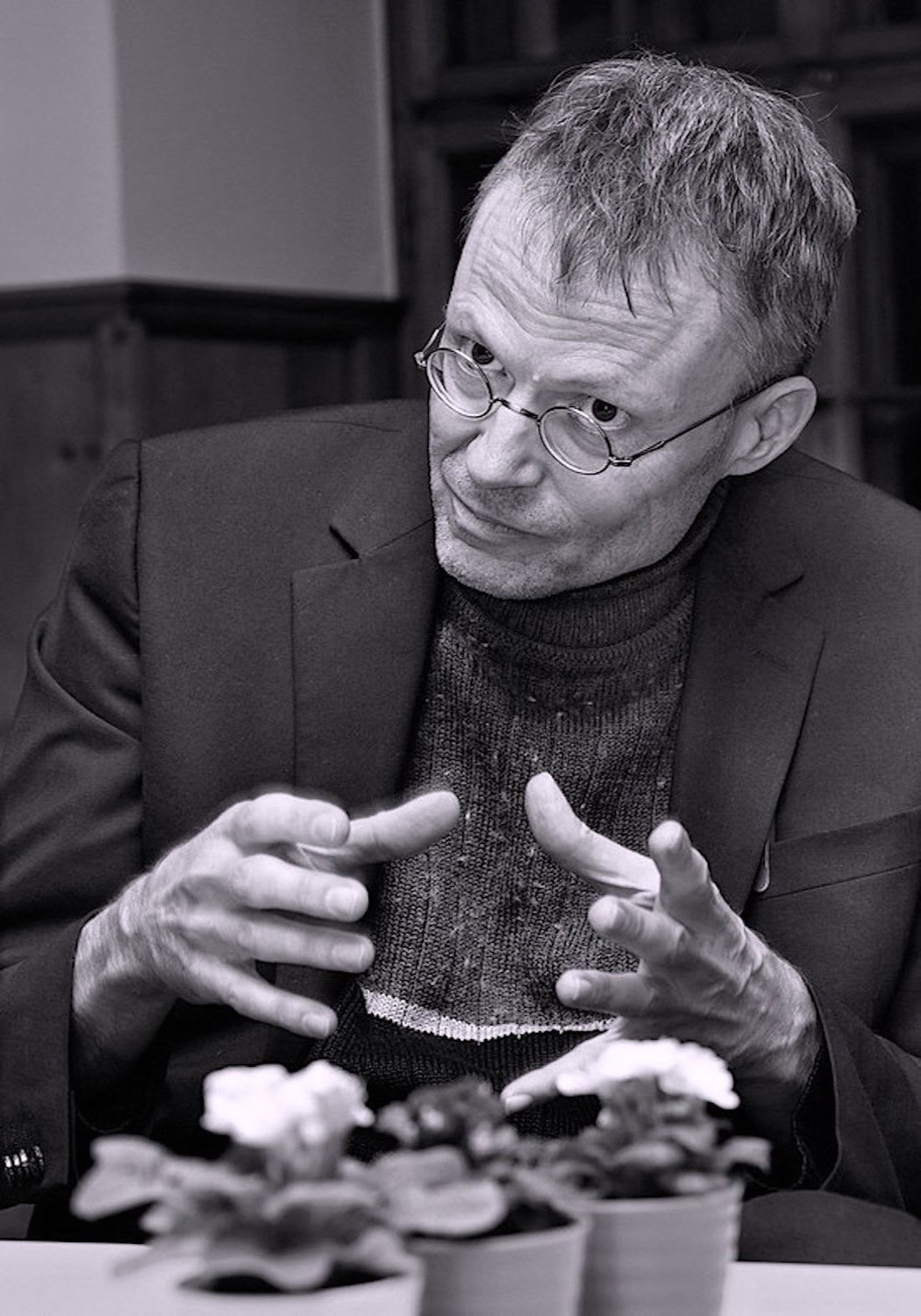
Markolf Niemz after a reading in Davos, Switzerland (2017)

Niemz' novel Lucy mit c was the first self-published book ever to appear on the German non-fiction bestseller list Gong. Lucy im Licht (Droemer, 2007), the second volume of his Lucy trilogy, and Bin ich, wenn ich nicht mehr bin? (Kreuz, 2011) also turned into German bestsellers. With the royalties of his Lucy trilogy, Niemz founded the charitable and non-profit foundation Stiftung Lucys Kinder. The foundation is committed to ensuring that children from the poorest countries in this world also have access to love and understanding.

In his book Seeing Our World Through Different Eyes (Wipf & Stock, 2020), Niemz invites us to understand the world through the Eastern concept of Advaita (in English: non-duality). Many terms that we conceive as opposing (space and time, being and becoming, chicken and egg, creator and creation) would actually be two sides of the same coin. In his book Wie geht leben? (Allegria, 2021), Niemz goes even one step further and solves the duality. He replaces nouns with verb forms. Viruses, bacteria, and cancer cells would primarily be processes rather than objects: an informing ("vir-ing"), an acting ("bacteri-ing"), and a miscommunicating ("cancer-ing"). Niemz even conceives us human beings and God as verb forms. By doing so, he closely follows Alfred North Whitehead and his philosophy of organism.

== Awards ==
- Karl-Freudenberg-Prize of the Heidelberg Academy of Sciences in 1995 for his work on "laser–tissue interactions".
- Research Fellow at Harvard Medical School in 1995 with a grant from the German Research Foundation.
- Scholarship holder of the Studienstiftung des Deutschen Volkes 1987–1992.

== Publications ==
- Laser–Tissue Interactions – Fundamentals and Applications. Springer, Berlin Heidelberg New York 2019, 4th edition, ISBN 978-3-030-11916-4.
- Lucy mit c – Mit Lichtgeschwindigkeit ins Jenseits. Books on Demand, Norderstedt 2005, ISBN 978-3-833-43739-7.
- Lucy im Licht – Dem Jenseits auf der Spur. Droemer, München 2007, ISBN 978-3-426-27420-0.
- Lucys Vermächtnis – Der Schlüssel zur Ewigkeit. Droemer, München 2009, ISBN 978-3-426-27498-9.
- Bin ich, wenn ich nicht mehr bin? – Ein Physiker entschlüsselt die Ewigkeit. Kreuz, Freiburg 2011, ISBN 978-3-451-61046-2.
- Sinn – Ein Physiker verknüpft Erkenntnis mit Liebe. Kreuz, Freiburg 2013, ISBN 978-3-451-61181-0.
- Sich selbst verlieren und alles gewinnen – Ein Physiker greift nach den Sternen. Kreuz, Freiburg 2015, ISBN 978-3-451-61322-7.
- Ichwahn – Ein Physiker erklärt, warum Abgrenzung gegen unsere Natur ist. Ludwig, München 2017, ISBN 978-3-453-28100-4.
- How Science Can Help Us Live in Peace – Darwin, Einstein, Whitehead. Universal Publishers, Irvine 2018, ISBN 978-1-627-34247-6.
- Die Welt mit anderen Augen sehen – Ein Physiker ermutigt zu mehr Spiritualität. Gütersloher Verlagshaus, Gütersloh 2020, ISBN 978-3-579-06212-9.
- Seeing Our World Through Different Eyes – Thoughts on Space and Time, Abraham Lincoln, and God. Wipf and Stock, Eugene 2020, ISBN 978-1-725-28545-3.
- Wie geht leben? – In Prozessen denken, verstehen und gesunden. Allegria, Berlin 2021, ISBN 978-3-793-42439-0.
