= Wissam Constantin =

Lebanese basketball player

No. 10 – Kahraba Zouk
- Position: Forward
- League: Lebanese Basketball League

Personal information
- Born: August 1, 1986 (age 40) Maghdouché
- Listed height: 6 ft 4 in (1.93 m)

Career information
- Playing career: 2003–present

Career history
- 2001-2002: Maghcouché
- 2002-2004: Blue Stars U-18
- 2004-2005: Blue Stars U-20
- 2007: Homenetmen Beirut B.C.
- 2007-2008: Club Central Jounieh
- 2008-2011: Louaize Club
- 2012-2013: Berj Aintoura
- 2014: Saint George Zalka
- 2015: Mayrouba Club
- 2016: Kahraba Zouk

Career highlights
- Fourth Division Champion (2009)

Wissam Constantin is the first deaf professional player in the Lebanese Basketball League. He is 1.92 m tall (6 ft 4 in) and weighs 85 kg (187 lbs).

== Early life ==
Born in Maghdouché, South of Lebanon on August 1, 1986.

== Education ==
Wissam presented an admission test to enter Notre Dame University – Louaize and got accepted. Then he graduated in June 2009 with distinction, to be the first deaf student in Lebanon and the Middle East with this high level of education in his country.

As he said in a TV interview explaining his choice of major: "My dream was to be a doctor and I always believed that I can make it come true. Unfortunately, a 'deaf doctor' is not commonly accepted by the Lebanese society. For this reason, accomplishing my dream in my own country was a bit hard and this is why I found a parallel major: Medical Laboratory Technology."

=== American University of Beirut - AUB (2009 - present) ===
Wissam's ambition pushed him to go forward to a master's degree in Microbiology and Immunology. And so he presented himself to the American University of Beirut and got accepted.

== Basketball career ==
=== Blue Stars 2002–2005 ===
Wissam played with Blue Stars for 3 seasons.

=== Homentmen 2006-2007 ===
In October 2005, Wissam didn't sign with any team.

After entering NDU, he re-continued basketball with the NDU team, then signed with Homentmen.

=== Central 2007-2008 ===
After an unpleasant season with Homentmen, Wissam moved to the Central team.

=== Louaize 2008-2011 ===
Louaize chose Wissam to be with them. He played with them for 2 years. In the 2nd division, Louaize built a team with coach Chafic Akiki. Wissam renewed the contract for another 2 years. After coach Akiki resigned, therefore Wissam decided to resign too.

=== Aintoura 2012 ===
Due to health problems, Wissam had to stop basketball for 6 months but he decided to start again with Aintoura team.

== Awards and honors ==
- In April 2008, the Faculty of Natural and Applied Sciences at NDU presented to him Said Akl Creativity Award.
- Moreover, he received the award for Academic Humanity distinction during the Commencement of the graduation Ceremony in July 2009.
- Wissam has also been honored by the Lebanon President Michel Suleiman who received him and his family in October 2009.
- In February 2010, he received an Award from the Lebanese Forces Student's Association. He was also honored by the Minister of Health Mouhamad Jawad Khalifeh for being the first in the exam of the practice of the profession to the year 2010.
- In December, Wissam received from NDU the Alumni Recognition Award in December 2010 in recognition of an outstanding professional achievement inspirational leadership and exceptional human qualities.

== Media ==
=== Interviews ===
- Baynetna - MTV - 13 March 2010

=== Articles ===
- "أصحاب التحديات يهدمون حواجز المجتمع بالإرادة" by Roula El Helou - Sinyé magazine - Issue Number 8
