= Rashida Abedi =

Pakistani-British autobiographical writer

- Born: 1951; Quetta
- Died: 2017 (aged 65–66)
- Known for: Autobiographical author
- Notable work: From Sound to Silence

Rashida Abedi (c. 1951 – 2017) was a Pakistani-British autobiographical writer, who was profoundly deaf.

== Life ==
Abedi, the daughter of a retired railwayman, was born and grew up in Quetta. After meningitis aged 14, she lost the hearing in her right ear, and specialists advised her to leave school:

All my hopes were destroyed. From then on my life was confined to the house. Most of the time was spent helping my mother, and I also used to knit, do embroidery and read books. We had a radio and my favourite hobby was listening to radio plays in Urdu.

At the age of 21 she also lost the hearing in her left ear, and as a result her engagement was broken off. "It was a cruel blow", she wrote. "I prayed to God I should die".

In 1981 she travelled to live with her brother, who had settled in London. She learnt English at South Norwood Adult Education Centre, and was soon also learning lip-reading and computing. Threatened with deportation in 1983, she successfully fought to stay with the help of the British Deaf Association and her local MP, Bernard Weatherill, who raised her case in Parliament. A campaigning group, Friends of Rashida Abedi, also raised the profile of her case.

Abedi wrote her autobiography to inspire others to overcome similar problems. She died of cancer in 2017, aged 65.

== Works ==
- From Sound to Silence, 1988. ISBN 978-0951606605
- Āvāz se Khāmoshī tak, 1990.
