= Lantz Mill =

- U.S. National Register of Historic Places
- Virginia Landmarks Register
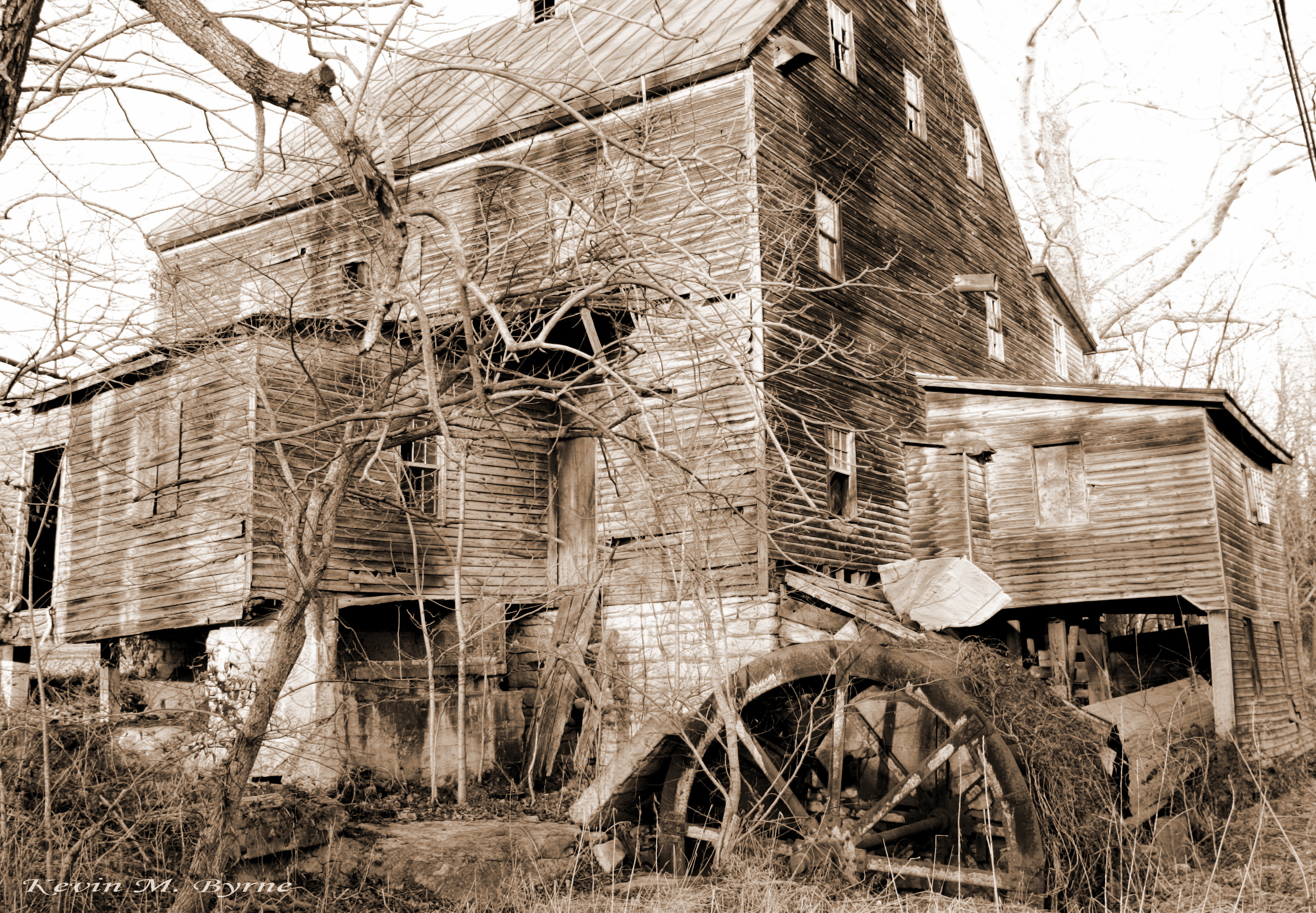
- Lantz Mill in 2005

- Location within Virginia Location within the United States
- Location: 95 Swover Creek Rd., near Edinburg, Virginia
- Coordinates: 38°50′28″N 78°35′33″W
- Area: 1 acre (0.40 ha)
- Built: c. 1867
- NRHP reference No.: 07001145
- VLR No.: 085-0933-0001

Significant dates
- Added to NRHP: November 1, 2007
- Designated VLR: September 5, 2007

Lantz Mill, also known as Lantz Roller Mill, is a historic grist mill located at Lantz Mills, near the town of Edinburg in Shenandoah County, Virginia. It was rebuilt in 1865, after being destroyed by Union troops in 1864 during "The Burning", an American Civil War military action conducted by General Philip Sheridan in the Valley Campaigns of 1864. It is a 2 1/2-story frame building erected with post-and-beam construction. It sits on an eight foot high limestone foundation and has a steep standing seam metal gable roof. Four additions were made to the mill in the early 20th century. The mill foundation, mill race (contributing), and mill-dam were constructed some time before 1813. The mill closed in the late 1970s.

It was listed on the National Register of Historic Places in 2007.
