= Kashaf Alvi =

Pakistani deaf author and activist

Kashaf Alvi is Pakistani deaf writer and activist who advocates for the deaf community.

== Career ==
In December 2021, Alvi's book The Language of Paradise was published by Liberty Books, and the book was launched at the President House, Islamabad by the First Lady of Pakistan, Samina Alvi. The book was reviewed by Dawn and The Nation. Previously, in the same year, he became the first person with a disability in Pakistan to receive certification as a Microsoft Associate.

In 2022, Alvi was named as the Pride of Pakistan by ISPR.

In January 2023, Alvi was selected as a Global Shaper, an initiative of the World Economic Forum. Two months later, he was appointed as the ambassador of the Pakistan Health Parliament.

The author of the 2023 comic book, Adventures of the Trail Master, features a character named Tray. The author, Haider, met Alvi while working on the illustration part of his book. The Language of Paradise, which chronicles Alvi's experiences living in a world of sounds he cannot hear, mirrors Tray's character, who is also deaf and mute, and communicates using sign language.

In 2024, Alvi wrote and starred in the film A Walk with God. The film explores themes of identity, faith, and individual life journeys.
