= Pierre Desloges =

French author and sign language advocate (1747 – c. 1799)

Pierre Desloges was a French author of books about sign language and politics. He was born in 1747 in the Touraine region of France and moved to Paris as a young man, where he became a bookbinder and upholsterer. He was deafened at age seven from smallpox, but did not learn to sign until he was 27, when he was taught by a deaf Italian.

In 1779, he wrote what may be the first book published by a deaf person, in which he advocated for the use of sign language in deaf education. It was in part a rebuttal of the views of Abbé Claude-François Deschamps de Champloiseau, who had published a book arguing against the use of signs. Desloges explained, "like a Frenchman who sees his language belittled by a German who knows only a few French words, I thought I was obliged to defend my language against the false charges of this author." He describes a community of deaf people using a sign language (now referred to as Old French Sign Language).

The Abbe de l’Épée has often been credited with the invention of sign language, but this is incorrect. Desloges' book proves that French Sign Language predates the establishment of the famous school for the Deaf in Paris and is truly the invention of deaf people.

Desloges also wrote a number of well-received political books around the time of the French Revolution. The time and place of his death are unknown, but he published a book as late as 1792. Some suggest that he died in 1799.
