= Anna Polivanchuk =

Swedish deaf swimmer

Personal information
- Nationality: Sweden
- Born: August 31, 1990 (age 35) Tallinn, Estonia

Sport
- Sport: Swimming
- Strokes: freestyle, backstroke, breaststroke
- College team: Swedish National Upper Secondary School for the Deaf
Medal record
Representing Sweden
Women's swimming
Deaflympics
Gold medal – first place	Taipei 2009	100m backstroke
Gold medal – first place	Taipei 2009	200m backstroke
Silver medal – second place	Taipei 2009	50m backstroke
Bronze medal – third place	Melbourne 2005	4×100m freestyle relay
Bronze medal – third place	Melbourne 2005	100m backstroke
Bronze medal – third place	Melbourne 2005	50m backstroke

Anna Polivanchuk (born 31 August 1990) is a Swedish female deaf swimmer and also the twin sister of Alexandra Polivanchuk. She competed at the Deaflympics in 2005 and 2009. She currently holds the deaf world swimming record in the women's 400m freestyle event which was set by her in 2006. She also graduated and continued her swimming career with the Gallaudet University.

== Career ==
Anna Polivanchuk made her Deaflympic debut at the 2005 Summer Deaflympics along with her twin sister, Alexandra Polivanchuk and claimed bronze medals in the women's 100m backstroke, 4×100 freestyle relay and 50m backstroke events. Anna was also the part of the Swedish team which claimed the bronze medal in the 4 × 100 m freestyle relay event as a part of the 2005 Deaflympics which also consisted Alexandra Polivanchuk.

Anna also competed at the 2009 Summer Deaflympics and claimed gold medals in the women's 100m backstroke and 200m backstroke events. Anna Polivanchuk was awarded the ICSD Deaf Sportswoman of the Year award in 2006 and was also nominated for the ICSD Deaf Sportswoman of the Year award in 2007 and 2009.
