= Alexandra Polivanchuk =

Swedish deaf swimmer

Personal information
- Nationality: Sweden
- Born: August 31, 1990 (age 35) Tallinn, Estonia

Sport
- Sport: Swimming
- Strokes: freestyle, butterfly
- College team: Swedish National Upper Secondary School for the Deaf
Medal record
Representing Sweden
Women's swimming
Deaflympics
Gold medal – first place	Melbourne 2005	50m butterfly
Gold medal – first place	Melbourne 2005	100m butterfly
Silver medal – second place	Taipei 2009	100m butterfly
Bronze medal – third place	Melbourne 2005	4×100m freestyle relay

Alexandra Polivanchuk (born 31 August 1990) is a Swedish female deaf swimmer who is also the twin sister of Anna Polivanchuk. She has represented Sweden at the Deaflympics in 2005, 2009 and 2013. She currently holds the deaf world swimming records in 50m and 100m butterfly events. She graduated and has been training the sport of swimming at the Gallaudet University.

== Work Life ==
Alexandra is a member of Härnösand team and also a holder of several Swedish National swimming records in the senior and junior level competitions.

Alexandra Polivanchuk made her Deaflympic debut at the age of 14 in the 2005 Summer Deaflympics which was held in Melbourne. She claimed gold medals in the women's 50m butterfly event and women's 100m butterfly events in her maiden Deaflympic appearance and became the youngest ever gold medalist for Sweden at the Deaflympics. (at the age of 14 years, 4 months and 5 days)

She set the deaf world record for the women's 50m butterfly event with a timing of 30.05. This was also a Deaflympic record held by Alexandra in her Deaflympic career which was later surpassed by Ukraine's Ganna Lytvynenko at the 2009 Summer Deaflympics.

In 2005, she was nominated for the ICSD Deaf Sportswoman of the Year award for her splendid performance at the Melbourne Deaflympics. She was also awarded the Rookie and Talent of the Year award by the Swedish Deaf Sports Federation in 2005.
