= Nansie S. Sharpless =

American biochemist and deaf advocate

- Born: October 11, 1932; West Chester
- Died: October 9, 1987 (aged 54); New York City
- Occupation: Biochemist
- Works: 3-Methoxy-4-hydroxyphenylalanine (3-O-methyldopa) in plasma during oral L-dopa therapy of patients with Parkinson's disease, Dopa and 3-O-methyldopa in cerebrospinal fluid of parkinsonism patients during treatment with oral l-dopa

Nansie S. Sharpless (October 11, 1932 – October 9, 1987) was an American biochemist. She was an associate professor of psychiatry and neurology and Chief of the Clinical Neuropsychopharmacology Laboratory at the Albert Einstein College of Medicine. Deaf from the age of fourteen, Sharpless encouraged deaf people to consider careers in scientific research. She also served as the president of the Foundation for Science and the Handicapped.

== Early life and education ==
Nansie Sue Sharpless was born October 11, 1932, in West Chester, Pennsylvania. Her father was a biochemist and as a child she gravitated towards studying science and mathematics. At age fourteen, she lost her hearing due to meningitis. She attended her local public high school as well as a Quaker boarding school, relying on notes from classmates and teachers to succeed.

Sharpless attended Oberlin College, graduating with a degree in zoology in 1954. Wayne State University admitted her for master's level studies in medical technology and she graduated in 1956. When she considered entering a doctoral program, friends and family discouraged her, saying she would have difficulty finding work as an "overeducated" deaf woman. The director of admissions at Wayne State told her she would held to higher standards in the program, as colleagues would question her ability to carry out professional duties. She was awarded a 1967–1968 fellowship from the women's advocacy organization Zonta International. Sharpless graduated with her Ph.D. in biochemistry in 1970 with a perfect 4.0 grade point average. Her dissertation advisor encouraged her to study l-DOPA metabolism, and her dissertation was titled "Catecholamine metabolism of the central nervous system as reflected in cerebrospinal fluid".

== Career ==
After graduating with her master's degree in medical technology in 1956, Sharpless worked for eleven years as a research medical technologist, publishing papers on immunochemistry and protein chemistry and working her way up to supervise several technicians. After earning her Ph.D., she spent four years of post-doctoral training at the Mayo Clinic.

In 1975 she joined the faculty at Albert Einstein College of Medicine and was tasked with organizing a monoamine assay laboratory for the departments of psychiatry and neurology. Sharpless was later promoted to the position of chief of the clinical neuropsychopharmacological laboratory. She was in that role and a member of the faculty until her death in 1987.

== Research and service ==
Sharpless was involved in research studying the role of neurotransmitter amines in brain function, as well as investigating changes in neurotransmitter amine metabolism in fluctuations of mood and behavior as well as various neurological and mental disorders. Her most notable work showcased the patterns of dystonia in Parkinson's disease patients in response to l-DOPA therapy. Sharpless authored over fifty research articles and eleven book chapters on the measurement of neurotransmitters, metabolism and mental disorders, and using animal models of neurological disorders. She was professionally active, serving on committees and panels in multiple organizations, including the National Science Foundation, the American Chemical Society, and the National Science Advisory Board.

About being a female deaf scientist, Sharpless said, "Deaf people are often treated like children, incapable of responsibility for their own affairs. Women are supposed to be passive, not too competent or independent. I don't fit... . It has taken time for people to get used to me. As a professional woman who is deaf, I represent a study in contrasts." She served as president of the Foundation for Science and the Handicapped. She was also a board member for the Alexander Graham Bell Association for the Deaf and Hard of Hearing. Sharpless encouraged deaf people to consider scientific research as a career in a paper presented at the American Association for the Advancement of Science meeting in 1975.

Wayne State University recognized her with their Distinguished Alumni Award in 1980.

Sharpless died October 9, 1987, in New York City.
