= Agatha Tiegel Hanson =

American educator of deaf students and writer

- Born: September 14, 1873; Pittsburgh
- Died: October 17, 1959; Portland
- Education: Gallaudet University
- Occupations: Teacher, writer
- Employer: Tate Hall, Minnesota State Academy for the Deaf
- Spouse: Olof Hanson

Agatha Tiegel Hanson (September 14, 1873 – October 17, 1959) was the second woman to graduate from the National Deaf-Mute College (Gallaudet College's official name until 1894) in 1893 and the first woman to receive a Bachelor of Arts from the school. She worked as an educator for deaf students and advocated for the deaf community throughout her life. Hanson also wrote poetry and edited a newspaper for the deaf.

== Early life ==
Agatha Mary Agnes Tiegel was born in Pittsburgh, Pennsylvania on September 14, 1873. At age seven she contracted spinal meningitis, which left her deaf and blind in one eye.

She attended a private Catholic school beginning at age nine, and when she was thirteen began attending the Western Pennsylvania School for the Deaf.

== Education at Gallaudet ==
Gallaudet College (then named the National Deaf-Mute College until 1894) enrolled women on an experimental basis in 1887 and six women enrolled. Tiegel enrolled in preparatory classes at the college in 1888 at the age of fifteen.

To overcome the challenges women faced in an overwhelmingly male environment, thirteen women students established a literary society named O.W.L.S. in 1892, naming Tiegel their president. The group discussed literature and debated with each other, since they were not permitted to debate with male students. The meaning of the O.W.L.S. abbreviation is secret, with only members knowing what the letters stand for. Over time O.W.L.S. would become a national alumnae organization, and in 1954 the National O.W.L.S. changed their name to Phi Kappa Zeta.

=== Graduation ===
Tiegel was the only woman to graduate from the college in 1893 and the class valedictorian. Although the "experimental" status of women students had been made permanent in 1889, deaf women still had reasons to feel their education was not valued as highly as that of men. At commencement, Tiegel gave a speech titled "The Intellect of Women," saying, "That such repression and restraint upon mental action are artificial has been demonstrated in all ages by women whose independence has burst every fetter and won them recognition in the fields of science, theology, literature, politics and art".

Alto May Lowman was the first woman to graduate from the school, receiving her Bachelor of Philosophy degree in 1892; Tiegel was the first woman to earn what was considered the more prestigious Bachelor of Arts degree.

== Career ==
After graduating Tiegel accepted an appointment to teach at the Minnesota School for the Deaf, where she worked for six years. She married deaf architect Olof Hanson in 1899; they moved to Seattle and had three children.

Hanson was a prolific writer. She wrote poetry throughout her life and published a book of poems titled Overflow Verses. In her poem titled "Inner Music," she described her deafness as an "imperfection," but one that allowed for "diviner harmony" and "peacefulness". She contributed articles to a national newspaper for the deaf, The Silent Worker, and later served as an editor for the Seattle newspaper for the deaf community, The Seattle Observer.

== Later life ==
Hanson and her husband were both influential leaders in the Seattle-area deaf community. She was active in several organizations, including the Puget Sound Association of the Deaf, the Washington State Association of the Deaf, and the deaf mission of the Episcopal Church.

Hanson died in Portland, Oregon on October 17, 1959.

== Legacy ==
Gallaudet's Hanson Plaza and Dining Hall is named in her honor. In 2014 Gallaudet celebrated its 150th anniversary by selecting fifteen notable alumni to highlight as "visionary leaders"; both Hanson and her husband, Olof, were among the fifteen selected.

In 2020 a biography of Hanson was written by Kathy Jankowski, Agatha Tiegel Hanson: Our Places in the Sun.
