= Eby-Brown =

Large Private Tobacco Company

Eby-Brown Co.
- Company type: Subsidiary
- Industry: Wholesale Distributor
- Founded: 1887; 139 years ago
- Headquarters: Naperville, Illinois, U.S.
- Key people: Dick Wake, Tom Wake, (co-presidents and CEOs)
- Number of employees: 2,300
- Parent: Performance Food Group
- Website: www.eby-brown.com

Eby-Brown Co. is the largest privately owned tobacco, candy and convenience distributor in the United States. Founded in 1887, Eby-Brown has been led by members of the Wake family for over 50 years. On March 19, 2019, Eby-Brown announced that it has agreed to be acquired by Performance Food Group.

== Locations ==
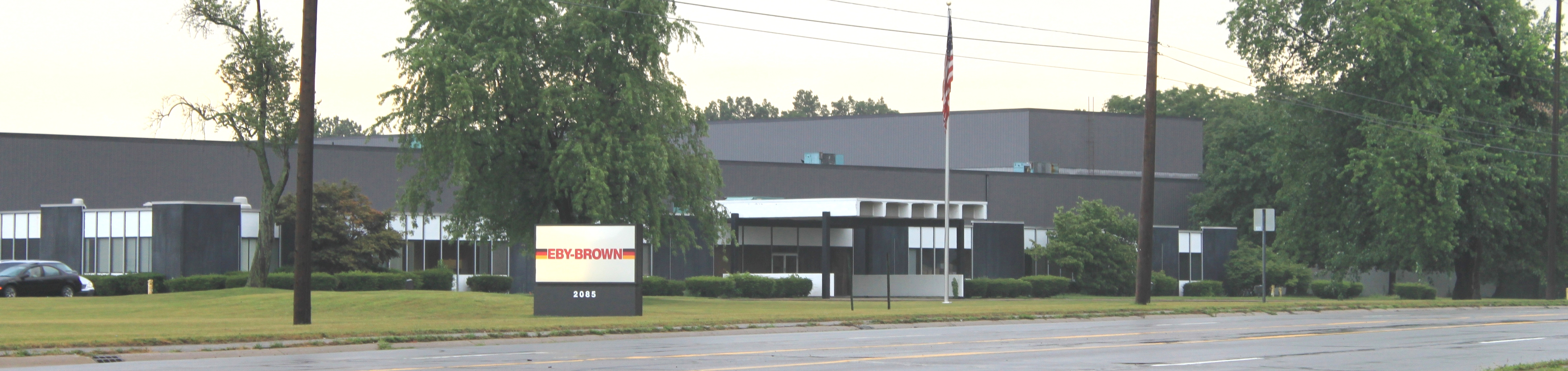
Ypsilanti distribution center

Eby-Brown's corporate headquarters is located in Naperville, Illinois. Eby-Brown's locations are:

- Plainfield, IN
- Naperville, IL
- Montgomery, IL
- Rockmart, GA
- Eau Claire, WI
- Shepherdsville, KY
- Springfield, OH
- Ypsilanti, MI
- West Mifflin, PA

== History ==
During its 130-year history, the Eby-Brown Company has changed ownership many times.

=== In the beginning ===
In 1888, Jacob Eby began a wholesale tobacco and candy manufacturing business at 128 W. Downer Place in Aurora, Illinois. In 1892, he formed a partnership with Edward Hinman and operated as "Eby and Hinman." A few years later, Peter Michels joined the firm and the company became "Eby, Hinman and Michels." In 1904, Michels sold his share of the business to C.C. Loser and T.H. Day, and the company was renamed Eby Loser Co." Loser and Day disposed of their holdings in 1907, but the firm continued to operate as Eby Loser until 1930. In 1912, candy manufacturing was discontinued. In 1930, Mr. Eby sold out to R.H. Youngen and A.E. Hallman, who renamed the company "Eby-Youngen."

=== The last name change ===
After World War II, Lyle Brown, Sr. bought out Youngen and Hallman, and gave the business its present name, "Eby-Brown Co." Lyle Brown discontinued the company's Schlitz Beer distributorship (even though the trucks continue to be painted in the traditional Schlitz color scheme to this day). Under Lyle Brown's direction, Eby-Brown Aurora and Joliet expanded rapidly. Within eight years, Brown had created Elgin Eby-Brown.

=== The family business anew ===
In 1956, W.H. (Mike) Michael and W.S. (Bill) Wake, two Elgin Eby-Brown salespeople, bought Elgin Eby-Brown. A year later, they bought Aurora Eby-Brown. The J.C. Theis Co. was purchased in 1960 and transformed into McHenry Eby-Brown. Galesburg Eby-Brown was begun in 1976, when the assets of Galesburg Cigar were purchased.

=== Current generation ===
In 1983, Mike Michael sold his interest in Eby-Brown to Bill Wake. Later that year, Tom and Dick Wake began to assume ownership of the Eby-Brown companies. Early in 1989, assets of Schiller Wholesale of Michigan were purchased. In mid-1989, assets of the Smith-Harris Company of Indianapolis were purchased, extending Eby-Brown's reach into Ohio and Kentucky. In January 1994, assets of Bosart Company of Springfield, Ohio were purchased. In March 1998, the assets of J.L. Lester Company of Rockmart, Georgia were purchased. In February 1999, Eby-Brown in Eau Claire, Wisconsin opened. In April 1999, Eby-Brown in Orlando, Florida opened. In September 2000, the assets of F.A. Davis and Sons in Baltimore, Maryland were purchased. In December 2000, Aurora Eby-Brown moved to Montgomery, Illinois. In January 2001, Elgin Eby-Brown joined the Aurora members in Montgomery. Also in January 2001, McHenry Eby-Brown merged with Eau Claire Eby-Brown. The Orlando, Florida location was closed in December 2005. In January 2008, the commissary operations in Springfield, Ohio expanded into a new company called NewFreshCo Foods LLC. The new company is a wholly owned subsidiary of Eby-Brown LLC. It operates under the name Wakefield Sandwich Company. March 1, 2016 Eby-Brown acquires Liberty USA in West Mifflin, PA.

Today, Eby-Brown is the third largest convenience distributor nationally, and continues to consolidate competitors and service programs from other vendors delivering convenience stores.

On March 19, 2019, Eby-Brown announced that it has agreed to be bought by Performance Food Group and that Dick and Tom Wake and current management will continue to run Eby-Brown as a subsidiary of Performance Food Group.

== Service area ==
Convenience stores, drug stores, grocery stores, liquor stores, gas stations, newspaper stands, and schools are just some of the types of accounts Eby-Brown services. Today, Eby-Brown's service area includes Alabama, Delaware, Georgia, Illinois, Indiana, Iowa, Kentucky, Maryland, Michigan, Minnesota, Missouri, New Jersey, North Carolina, Ohio, Pennsylvania, South Carolina, Tennessee, Virginia, West Virginia, and Wisconsin.

== Facts and figures ==
- 14,500 retail locations served
- 1,933,000 sq feet of warehouse space
- 2,300 employee members
- 8 distribution centers
