= Margareta Trnková-Hanne =

Czech tennis player (born 1976)

Personal information
- Nationality: Czech
- Born: 17 November 1976 (age 49) Trenčín, Czechoslovakia

Sport
- Country: Czech Republic
- Sport: Athletics, tennis
Medal record
Representing Czech Republic
Women's Athletics
Summer Deaflympics
| Gold medal – first place | Rome 2001 | 100m |
| Gold medal – first place | Rome 2001 | 200m |
| Gold medal – first place | Melbourne 2005 | 100m |
| Gold medal – first place | Melbourne 2005 | 200m |

Margareta Trnková-Hanne (also known as Margareta Hanne; born 17 November 1976) is a Czech deaf former track and field athlete and tennis player. She has represented Czech Republic at the Deaflympics in tennis and athletics sporting events.

Margareta Hanne competed at the Deaflympics in 1993, 1997, 2001, 2005 and 2009. She has claimed four gold medals in her Deaflympic career in the women's 100m and 200m individual events. She was also nominated for the ICSD Deaf Sportswoman of the Year award in 2001 and 2005, mainly for her achievements at the 2001 and 2005 Deaflympic events.
