= Matthew Eby =

American deaf soccer player

Matthew Lynn Eby (born March 24, 1984) is an American deaf soccer player born in Lancaster, Pennsylvania, United States. Deaf since birth, Eby attended Lancaster Mennonite High School then Gallaudet University in Washington, D.C. After graduating from Gallaudet University in 2008, Eby signed a one-year contract with Real Maryland FC of the United Soccer Leagues (USL) where he played the position of Defender/Midfield.

Eby's soccer history includes the following:

- 2016 3rd Deaf Football World Championships, Salerno, Italy
- 2012 2nd Deaf Football World Championships, Ankara, Turkey
- 2012 Exhibition Soccer game at Crew Stadium, Columbus, OH
- 2011 Pan American Games for the Deaf, Barquisimeto, Venezuela
- 2009 Deaflympics Summer Games, Taipei, Taiwan
- 2008 1st Deaf Football World Championships, Patras, Greece
- 2007 International Exhibition vs. Great Britain Deaf soccer team in England
- 2005 Deaflympics Summer Games, Melbourne, Australia

Eby has been honored by his alma mater, Lancaster Mennonite High School, Blazer Nation athletic booster. Eby graduated from LMHS in 2003 and was a Lancaster-Lebanon League All-Star in Soccer and Basketball.

He then enrolled at Gallaudet University where he became a three-time All-CAC Second team selection (2004, 2005, 2006). While at Gallaudet Eby competed on the USA Deaf National Soccer Team at the World Deaf Football Championship. Eventually placing fourth out of fifteen teams. Eby worked as Assistant Coach of the Bison Soccer team at Gallaudet while playing for Real Maryland.

Eby was encouraged by a former coach to try out for the Real Maryland team, who saw a notice that the team was holding tryouts. Eby attended tryouts with an interpreter which is what first grabbed Coach Silvino Gonzalo's attention. Eby is one of the few known deaf professional soccer players in the world.

Married to wife, Kimberly, with three sons, Trenton, Kona and Griffin, Eby has been working as the athletic director at the Wisconsin School for the Deaf since August 2012. Prior to this he worked as the athletic director and Physical Education Teacher at the New York School for the Deaf between 2010 and 2012.

Eby tells about his beginnings in soccer, "I started playing soccer at 11 years old and was taught by my two older brothers. My older brother, Phil, I always attended all of his high school soccer games, where I learned more about the sport. My middle brother, James, always helped me out by going to my soccer games and interpreting for me in high school.
