= Stefan Markolf =

German footballer

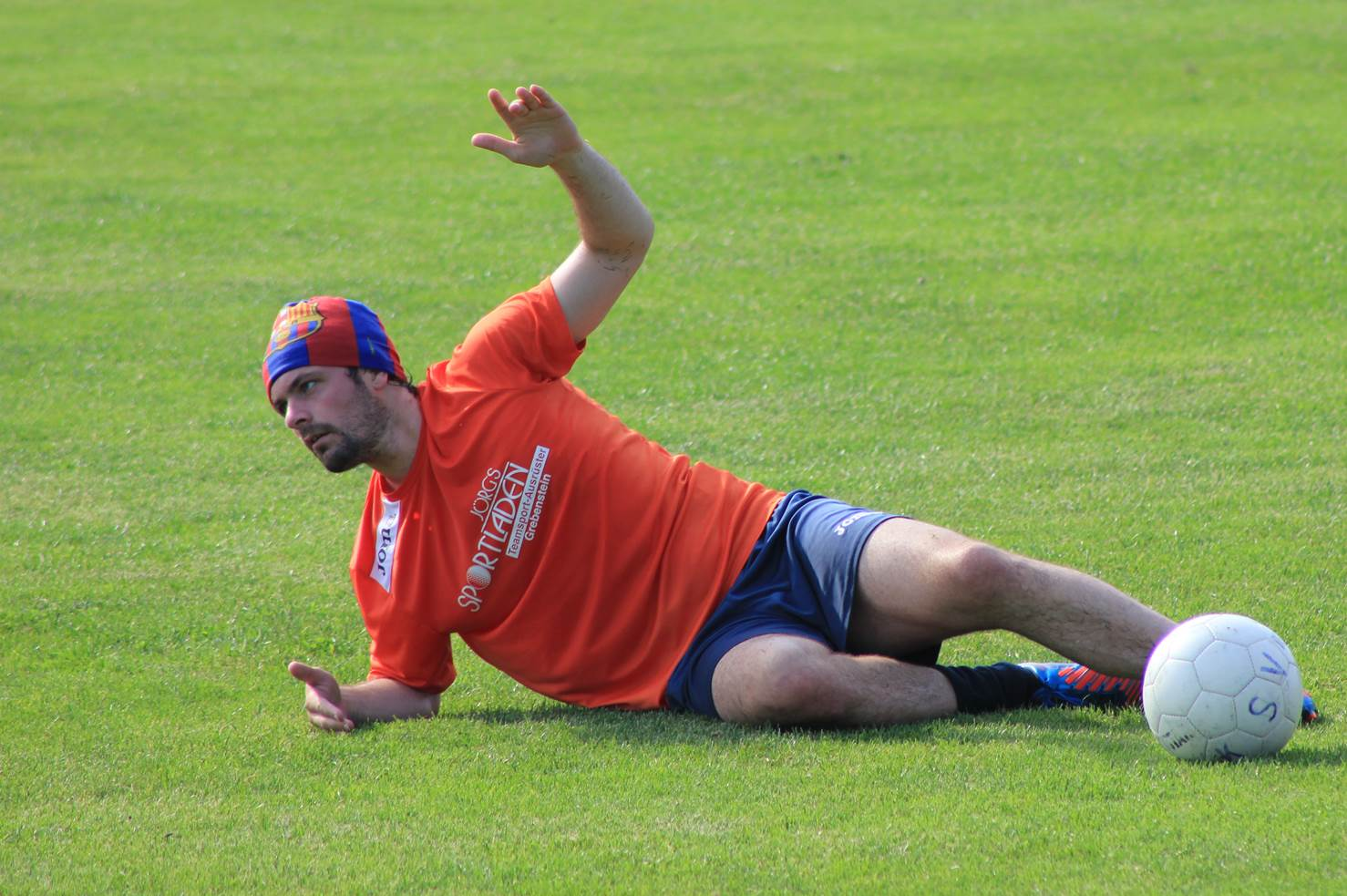
- Stefan Markolf preparing for the regional league with KSV Baunatal

Personal information
- Full name: Stefan Markolf
- Date of birth: 3 January 1984 (age 42)
- Place of birth: Witzenhausen, West Germany
- Height: 1.78 m (5 ft 10 in)
- Position: Defender

Team information
- Current team: KSV Baunatal

Youth career
- 1989–2000: VfB Witzenhausen
- 2000–2001: KSV Hessen Kassel
- 2001–2002: KSV Baunatal

Senior career*
Years	Team	Apps	(Gls)
2002–2004	KSV Baunatal	30	(6)
2004–2007	1. FSV Mainz 05 II	75	(7)
2007–2008	1. FSV Mainz 05	8	(0)
2008–2009	Wuppertaler SV	6	(0)
2009–2010	KSV Hessen Kassel	17	(0)
2010–2014	KSV Baunatal	51	(0)
Total		187	(13)
- * Club domestic league appearances and goals

Stefan Markolf (born 3 January 1984) is the first deaf German professional footballer. He plays as a defender.

== Career ==
After joining the professional squad of 1. FSV Mainz 05 in 2007, where the defender was mostly substituted, he was signed by third division club Wuppertaler SV in 2008. After eight years he returned to KSV Hessen Kassel.

== Personal ==
Markolf was born deaf (about 90 percent hearing loss). Thanks to speech therapy, he has nearly perfect pronunciation of the spoken language. In spite of his hearing loss, he has a good overview in the football matches. He wears special hearing aids while playing.
