= Kate Ward =

American soccer player (born 1994)

Personal information
- Full name: Katherine Ann Ward
- Date of birth: January 29, 1994 (age 32)
- Height: 5 ft 4 in (1.63 m)
- Position: Midfielder

College career
Years	Team	Apps	(Gls)
2012–2015	Appalachian State Mountaineers	47	(5)

International career^{‡}
2009–	US Deaf WNT	33	(8)

Managerial career
- 2017–2018: VCU Rams (graduate assistant)
- 2019–2022: UTEP Miners (assistant coach)
- 2022–: High Point Panthers (assistant coach)
Medal record
Women's deaf soccer
Representing United States
Deaflympics
Gold medal – first place	2009 Taipei	Team
Gold medal – first place	2013 Sofia	Team
Gold medal – first place	2021 Caxias Do Sul	Team
World Deaf Football Championships
Gold medal – first place	2012 Ankara	Team
Gold medal – first place	2016 Italy	Team
Gold medal – first place	2023 Kuala Lumpur	Team
- ‡ National team caps and goals as of November 18, 2025

Katherine Ann Ward (born January 29, 1994) is an American soccer player and coach. She captains the United States women's deaf national team and is an assistant coach for the High Point University women's soccer team.

With the deaf national team, Ward is a three-time Deaflympics gold medalist (2009, 2013, and 2021) and three-time World Deaf Football Champion (2012, 2016, and 2023). She played college soccer at Appalachian State and previously was an assistant coach at Virginia Commonwealth University and the University of Texas at El Paso.

== Early life and college career ==
Ward began playing soccer at age four. She played for various club teams, including Atlanta Fire United and Tophat SC. She also played for the Georgia Olympic Development Program (ODP) team. She played four years of high school soccer at St. Pius X Catholic High School in Atlanta, helping win the NSCAA national championships in 2009 and three state titles from 2009 to 2011.

=== Appalachian State Mountaineers, 2012–2015 ===
Ward played college soccer for the Mountaineers at Appalachian State University, making 47 appearances over four seasons. She graduated magna cum laude with a bachelor's degree in cellular and molecular biology in 2016.

== International career ==
Ward was first invited to try out for the women's deaf national team at age 12. At age 15, she knew little sign language before joining the team for the 2009 Summer Deaflympics in Taiwan, where she was a flag bearer for her country at the opening ceremony. She started every match to help the team win gold, scoring two goals, including one in the final, and was the youngest goalscorer in tournament history. She started every game at her next international tournament, the 2012 World Deaf Football Championships in Turkey, and recorded one goal and four assists as United States took the gold medal. She continued to win gold with the team at the 2013 Deaflympics in Bulgaria, where she opened scoring in the final, and the 2016 World Championships in Italy.

Ward captained the team at the 2021 Deaflympics in Brazil, where she led the United States to another gold medal, though she had to be subbed out in the final due to injury while the team prevailed on penalties. Following the tournament, she was a finalist for the Best Female Athlete with a Disability ESPY Award. She won her sixth international gold medal at the 2023 World Championships in Malaysia.

== Coaching career ==
Before deciding to coach soccer, Ward considered entering otorhinolaryngology (ear, nose, and throat) or physical therapy and spent a gap year after college in a physical therapy clinic. She volunteered as a high school coach at the Atlanta Area School for the Deaf and her alma mater, St. Pius X. In 2017, she enrolled in the Center for Sport Leadership at Virginia Commonwealth University, where she was a graduate assistant for the VCU Rams women's soccer team, and received her Master of Education in sports leadership in 2018.

Ward became an assistant coach for the UTEP Miners women's soccer program in 2019. She joined the High Point Panthers women's soccer team as an assistant coach in 2022.

== Personal life ==
Ward was raised in Chamblee, a suburb of Atlanta, Georgia, one of three children born to Tony and Joan Ward. Her family realized when she was three years old that she was deaf in one ear and hard of hearing in the other. She became totally deaf at the age of six and had surgery to wear cochlear implants.

Ward has served on the board of directors of the USA Deaf Soccer Association since 2014.
