= Sydney Andrews (soccer) =

American soccer player (born 1993)

Personal information
- Full name: Sydney Elizabeth Andrews
- Date of birth: December 15, 1993 (age 32)
- Height: 5 ft 7 in (1.70 m)
- Position: Center back

College career
Years	Team	Apps	(Gls)
2012–2015	Missouri Western Griffons	69	(5)

International career^{‡}
2012–	US Deaf WNT	32	(2)
Medal record
Women's deaf soccer
Representing United States
Deaflympics
Gold medal – first place	2013 Sofia	Team
Gold medal – first place	2021 Caxias Do Sul	Team
World Deaf Football Championships
Gold medal – first place	2012 Turkey	Team
Gold medal – first place	2016 Italy	Team
Gold medal – first place	2023 Kuala Lumpur	Team
- ‡ National team caps and goals as of November 18, 2025

Sydney Elizabeth Andrews (born 1993) is an American soccer player who plays as a center back for the United States women's deaf national team. Raised in Wichita, Kansas, she played college soccer for the Missouri Western Griffons.

== Early life and college career ==
Andrews was raised in Wichita, Kansas. She played high school soccer as a defender at Wichita Northwest High School, earning first-team all-state honors in 2012. She attended Missouri Western State University, where she was a four-year starter as a midfielder or defender for the Missouri Western Griffons from 2012 to 2015, being named to the All-MIAA third team as a junior and All-MIAA second team as a senior.

== International career ==
Andrews has played for the United States deaf national team since 2011. She won gold as a member of the team at the 2012 World Deaf Football Championships, the 2013 Deaflympics, and the 2016 World Championships. She captained the team to win gold at the 2021 Deaflympics in Brazil. She played every minute at center back at the 2023 World Championships, winning gold, and was nominated for U.S. Soccer's Female Deaf Player of the Year award.

== Personal life ==
Andrews was born deaf and diagnosed at age two, when she began wearing hearing aids. She had surgery for a cochlear implant at age 21.

Outside of soccer, Andrews works as a physical therapy assistant.
