= United States women's national deaf soccer team =

Women's deaf national soccer team representing the United States

United States
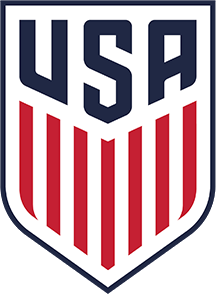
- Association: United States Soccer Federation (USSF)
- Head coach: Tricia Taliaferro
- Captain: Gracie Fitzgerald
- Most caps: Kate Ward (35)
- Top scorer: Emily Spreeman (50)

First international
- United States 5–2 Denmark (Melbourne, Australia; January 6, 2005)

Biggest win
- United States 14–0 Great Britain (United Kingdom) (Fukushima, Japan; November 23, 2025)
Medal record
Deaflympics
Gold medal – first place	2005 Melbourne	Team
Gold medal – first place	2009 Taipei	Team
Gold medal – first place	2013 Sofia	Team
Gold medal – first place	2021 Caxias Do Sul	Team
Gold medal – first place	2025 Tokyo	Team
World Deaf Football Championships
Gold medal – first place	2012 Turkey	Team
Gold medal – first place	2016 Italy	Team
Gold medal – first place	2023 Malaysia	Team
- Website: Official website

The United States women's national deaf soccer team (USDWNT) represents the United States of America in international women's deaf soccer. The team is governed by the United States Soccer Federation.

The team has an all-time undefeated record of 44–0–1 as of November 25, 2025. They have won five Deaflympics gold medals (2005, 2009, 2013, 2021, and 2025) and three World Championship gold medals (2012, 2016, 2023). Players have hearing loss of at least 55 decibels, and they communicate on the field using American Sign Language and other hand gestures.

== History ==
The United States first fielded a women's deaf soccer team to compete in the 2005 Summer Deaflympics in Australia, the first year the sport was played at the tournament, and they won the gold medal with a 3–0 win over Russia in the title game. The team defended the title at the 2009 Deaflympics in Taiwan, beating Germany 4–0 in the final with all second-half goals. They won the World Deaf Football Championships for the first time at the 2012 tournament in Turkey, beating Russia 1–0 in the final. The team won its third Deaflympics in a row at the 2013 tournament in Bulgaria, conceding its only goal of the event in the 2–1 win over Russia in the final. The United States faced Russia again in the final of the 2016 World Championships in Italy, beating them 3–0 to win the title.

The team recorded its first non-win with a 2–2 draw to Poland in the final of the 2021 Deaflympics in Brazil (held in 2022), but won the title 4–2 on penalties. Along with the US Deaf Men's National Team, the women's team also came under the umbrella of the United States Soccer Federation as one of its extended national teams in 2022. The team won the 2023 World Championships in Malaysia, beating Turkey 3–0 in the final. The team played a friendly doubleheader alongside the United States women's national team in Colorado on June 1, 2024, which marked the team's first international game on home soil.

== Players ==
Statistics as of November 25, 2025.

=== Current squad ===
The following players were named to the squad for the July 28-Aug. 2 training camp.

No.	Pos.	Player	Date of birth (age)	Caps	Goals	Hometown
21	GK	Taegan Ferrin	2003 (age 22–23)	10	0	Centerville, Utah
12	GK	Sierra Kaspar	2008 (age 17–18)	3	0	Fort Worth, Texas
	GK	Ruby Miller	2008 (age 17–18)	0	0	Chicago, Illinois
	DF	Eva Barbic	2010 (age 15–16)	0	0	Manhattan Beach, California
3	DF	Paige Beaudry	2002 (age 23–24)	16	1	Riverview, Michigan
19	DF	Chelsea Tumey	2009 (age 16–17)	2	0	Peoria, Arizona
18	DF	Faith Wylie	February 10, 2004 (age 22)	15	6	Decatur, Texas
8	MF	Erin Cembrale	June 24, 2001 (age 25)	16	7	Oyster Bay, New York
5	MF	Gracie Fitzgerald	March 16, 1999 (age 27)	24	4	Georgetown, Indiana
4	MF	Holly Hunter	March 10, 2003 (age 23)	10	10	Temecula, California
	MF	Alexis Jones	2007 (age 18–19)	2	0	Las Vegas, Nevada
9	MF	Ani Khachadourian	October 3, 2002 (age 23)	13	10	Cary, North Carolina
16	MF	Emma Neff	2005 (age 20–21)	10	1	Oakwood, Ohio
14	MF	Paris Price	2005 (age 20–21)	18	4	Fall City, Washington
7	MF	Sabina Shysh	1996 (age 29–30)	7	1	Tucson, Arizona
	FW	Marissa Garate	2006 (age 19–20)	0	0	Tucson, Arizona
	FW	Haley Jetton	1993 (age 32–33)	0	0	Paris, Texas
	FW	Kaylee Kleist	2002 (age 23–24)	0	0	Decatur, Illinois
13	FW	Casey King	2000 (age 25–26)	8	5	Bexley, Ohio
15	FW	Tia LaBrecque	2009 (age 16–17)	6	4	Raynham, Massachusetts
23	FW	Sophie Post	2003 (age 22–23)	18	10	Murray, Utah
17	FW	Mia White	1998 (age 27–28)	18	7	Littleton, Colorado

=== Recent call-ups ===
The following players were also named to a squad in the last 12 months.

Pos.	Player	Date of birth (age)	Caps	Goals	Hometown	Latest call-up
GK	Meghan Maiwald	March 6, 1990 (age 36)	14	0	Gilroy, California	2025 Deaflympics; November 2025
DF	Josephine Blazic	2006 (age 19–20)	2	2	East Tawas, Michigan	ADAPTandTHRIVE Invitational; May 2026
DF	Sydney Andrews	December 15, 1993 (age 32)	34	3	Wichita, Kansas	2025 Deaflympics; November 2025
DF	Melia Lenert	February 6, 2006 (age 20)	3	0	Long Beach, California	2025 Deaflympics; November 2025
MF	Olivia Mackey	1992 (age 33–34)	1	0	Vancouver, Washington	ADAPTandTHRIVE Invitational; May 2026
MF	Hannah Romero	November 7, 2001 (age 24)	0	0	Rialto, California	ADAPTandTHRIVE Invitational; May 2026
MF	Kate Ward	January 29, 1994 (age 32)	35	9	Atlanta, Georgia	2025 Deaflympics; November 2025
MF	Payton DeGraw	2000 (age 25–26)	6	0	Salt Lake City, Utah	2025 Deaflympics; November 2025
FW	Emily Spreeman	August 30, 1989 (age 36)	30	50	Fountain Valley, California	2025 Deaflympics; November 2025

== Staff ==
Role	Name	Start date	Ref.
Head coach	(United States) Tricia Taliaferro	2026	
Assistant coach	(United States) Stephanie Gabbert	2026	
Goalkeeper coach	(United States) Meghan Maiwald		

== Individual records ==
=== Player records ===
As of November 25, 2025.

Active players are shown in bold.

Most caps
Rank	Player	Caps	Goals	Years
1	Kate Ward	35	9	2009–2025
2	Sydney Andrews	34	3	2012–2025
3	Emily Spreeman	30	50	2005–2025
4	**Gracie Fitzgerald**	24	4	2016–
5	Liza Offreda	19	7	2009–2016
6	**Sophie Post**	18	10	2022–
	**Paris Price**	18	4	2022–
	**Mia White**	18	7	2022–
9	Reagan Anders	16	2	2005–2012
	**Paige Beaudry**	16	1	2022–
	**Erin Cembrale**	16	7	2022–
	Madison Taylor	16	0	2012–2016

Most goals
Rank	Player	Goals	Caps	Years	Avg
1	Emily Spreeman	50	30	2005–2025	1.67
2	Felicia Schroeder	19	14	2009–2013	1.36
3	Julia Nelson	12	9	2012–2013	1.33
4	Erin Coppedge	11	7	2012–2013	1.57
5	**Holly Hunter**	10	10	2023–	1.00
	**Ani Khachadourian**	10	13	2022–	0.77
	**Sophie Post**	10	18	2022–	0.56
8	Kate Ward	9	35	2009–2025	0.26
9	Katie Romano	8	15	2005–2012	0.53
10	**Erin Cembrale**	7	16	2022–	0.44
	**Mia White**	7	18	2022–	0.39
	Liza Offreda	7	19	2009–2016	0.37
