= Hüseyin Er =

Turkish-born English footballer (1985–2021)

Personal information
- Date of birth: 14 January 1985
- Place of birth: Göksun, Kahramanmaraş, Turkey
- Date of death: 16 May 2021 (aged 36)
- Place of death: London, United Kingdom
- Position: Forward

Youth career
- 1999–2003: Tottenham DFC

Senior career*
Years	Team	Apps	(Gls)
- Tottenham DFC
- Arsenal DFC
- Kartal Municipality DFC
- St. John's DFC
- İzmirspor

International career
2006–2019	Turkey deaf	45	(7)
- * Club domestic league appearances and goals

Hüseyin Er (14 January 1985 – 16 May 2021) was a deaf Turkish-born footballer who grew up and mostly lived in London. He was a member of the Turkey national deaf football team.

== Private life ==
Er was born to Haydar and Çiçek in Göksun, Kahramanmaraş Province, southern Turkey in 1985. He had eight siblings, of whom four are also deaf. He had a twin brother, Hasan, who also became a football player. The family migrated to the United Kingdom when he was two years old.

== Club career ==
Er started playing football at a very young age. Memnos Costi, a deaf footballer and coach, who knew the twin brothers since their age of six, taught them to play football. At 14, the quick-learning boy became a member of Tottenham Deaf Football Club (DFC). He then played for Arsenal DFC, and also for St John's DFC. With St John's DFC, he won all of the domestic trophies.

In 2012, Er transferred from the British Arsenal DFC to the 2011–12 Turkish league champion Kartal Municipality DFC in Istanbul, Turkey together with his brother Ali. In the second half of the 2019–20 season, he transferred to İzmirspor in the Turkish Regional Amateur League.

== International career ==
Er became a member of the Turkey deaf football team in 2006. During his career, his national team took the runners-up position at the 2008 World Championships and EuroDeaf 2011, and champion titles at the World Championships (2012, 2016), 2017 Deaflympics by, and European Championships (Of Soccer’s 2015, 2019). He was named Best Player of the 2008 World Championships.

Er played at the 2017 Summer Deaflympics held in Samsun, Turkey. He scored one goal in the match against Italy, and two goals against Saudi Arabia. At the EuroDeaf 2019 in Heraklion, Greece, he netted four goals in total.

Er took part in the Group F of the qualification round for the EuroDeaf 2019 held in Wales. The opponents were Bosnia and Herzegovina, Sweden, and Wales.

International goals
Year	Competition	Opponent	Result	Goals	Ref
Turkey national deaf football team
2017	Summer Deaflympics	Italy	W 4–0	1	
2017	Summer Deaflympics	Saudi Arabia	W 3–1	2	
2019	EuroDeaf	Denmark	W 6–1	4	
2019	EuroDeaf	Ireland	W 6–0	4	
2019	EuroDeaf	Hungary	W 8–0	4	
2019	EuroDeaf	Greece	L 2–4	4	
2019	EuroDeaf	England	W 2–0	4	
2019	EuroDeaf	Russia	W 2–1	4	

== Death ==
Er died from a heart attack after a training session in London at the age of 36 on 16 May 2021. He was interred at Lavender Hill Cemetery in Enfield, London. His family later held a memorial and religious service at the London Alevi Cultural Centre and Cem-Evi.

== Honours ==
=== Individual ===
Best player (1): 2008 World

=== International ===
Turkey national deaf football team
Champions (4): 2012 World, EuroDeaf 2015, 2016 World, 2017 Deaflympics, EuroDeaf 2019
Runners-up (1): 2008 World, EuroDeaf 2011
