= Emily Spreeman =

American soccer player (born 1989)

Personal information
- Birth name: Emily Ann Cressy
- Date of birth: August 30, 1989 (age 37)
- Place of birth: Ventura, California
- Height: 5 ft 5 in (1.65 m)
- Position: Forward

Youth career
- Eagles SC

College career
Years	Team	Apps	(Gls)
2007–2010	Kansas Jayhawks	60	(23)

International career^{‡}
2005–2025	US Deaf WNT	30	(50)
Medal record
Women's deaf soccer
Representing United States
Deaflympics
Gold medal – first place	2005 Melbourne	Team
Gold medal – first place	2021 Caxias Do Sul	Team
Gold medal – first place	2025 Tokyo	Team
World Deaf Football Championships
Gold medal – first place	2016 Italy	Team
Gold medal – first place	2023 Kuala Lumpur	Team
- ‡ National team caps and goals as of November 25, 2025

Emily Spreeman (née Cressy; born August 30, 1989) is an American soccer player for the United States women's deaf national team. A forward, she is the deaf national team's all-time leading scorer.

Spreeman played college soccer for the Kansas Jayhawks, where she was named the Big 12 Conference Rookie of the Year in 2008. With the deaf national team, she is a two-time Deaflympics gold medalist (2005 and 2021) and two-time World Deaf Football Champion (2016 and 2023).

== Youth and college career ==
Spreeman began playing soccer when she was four. At age eight, she joined Eagles Soccer Club of Camarillo, California, and won the US Youth Soccer National Championships with the team at the under-14 level in 2004 and under-17 in 2007. She scored two goals in the final of the latter tournament and received the Golden Boot as the event's top player. She also played for the regional Cal-South Olympic Development Program (ODP) team, where she was a teammate of future national team player Alex Morgan. While in high school, she was called up to the deaf national team at age 15.

Spreeman played two years of high school soccer at Buena High School after she transferred from Ventura. Her teammates learned sign language to communicate with her on and off the field. In her senior year in 2007, she was converted from midfielder to striker and recorded 16 goals and 11 assists. She led the team into the playoffs, winning the Channel League and making the CIF Southern Section semi-finals, and was named first-team All-CIF and the Ventura County Star's player of the year.

=== Kansas Jayhawks ===
Spreeman played college soccer for the Jayhawks at the University of Kansas. The university provided her with sign language interpreters for classes, practices, games, and interviews; on the field, she also read the lips of her teammates and coaches. She redshirted her first year, practicing with the team but traveling with them only for an exhibition series in Brazil in the spring. In the 2008 season, she scored in her first official game against Purdue and led the team with five goals by the seventh game. At the end of the season, with eight goals, she was named the Big 12 Conference Rookie of the Year and the USA Deaf Sports Federation Sportswoman of the Year and received national all-rookie recognition from Soccer America, SoccerBuzz, and TopDrawerSoccer.

In the 2009 season, Spreeman led the team with 12 goals, tied for second best in program history at the time, and was named to the United Soccer Coaches all-region third team. In the summer of 2010, she won her third national title with her club team, Eagles, at the USASA under-23 championships, recording the game-winning assist in the final. She concluded her college career in 2010 with 23 career goals, seventh in program history as of 2023, and six assists.

== International career ==
Spreeman has represented the United States internationally in deaf soccer since the age of 15, when she started all six matches in the team's gold medal-winning debut at the 2005 Summer Deaflympics in Australia. She received the Golden Boot and Golden Ball at the 2016 World Deaf Football Championships in Italy, where the United States won gold. She also won gold at the 2021 Deaflympics in Brazil. She led the team to win the 2023 World Deaf Football Championships in Malaysia, scoring 13 goals in six games, and repeated as the tournament's Golden Boot and Golden Ball winner. For her performance, she was also named U.S. Soccer's first Female Deaf Player of the Year in 2023.

Spreeman set a single-game team record with six goals against Australia on June 1, 2024, in an exhibition double header with the women's national team. As of 2024, she is the deaf national team's all-time leading scorer and the only active player from the team's original roster at the 2005 Deaflympics.

== Personal life ==
Spreeman was raised in Ventura, California, one of three daughters of Rick and Rhonda Cressy. She was born very hearing-impaired, which her family discovered when she was nine months old, and originally wore hearing aids in both ears and learned to speak. During her second year of high school, the little hearing she had in her right ear disappeared, after which she became increasingly deaf.

As of 2023, Spreeman lives in Newport Beach, California. Outside of soccer, she works as a spa esthetician.
