= Para football =

Various forms of association football for disabled players

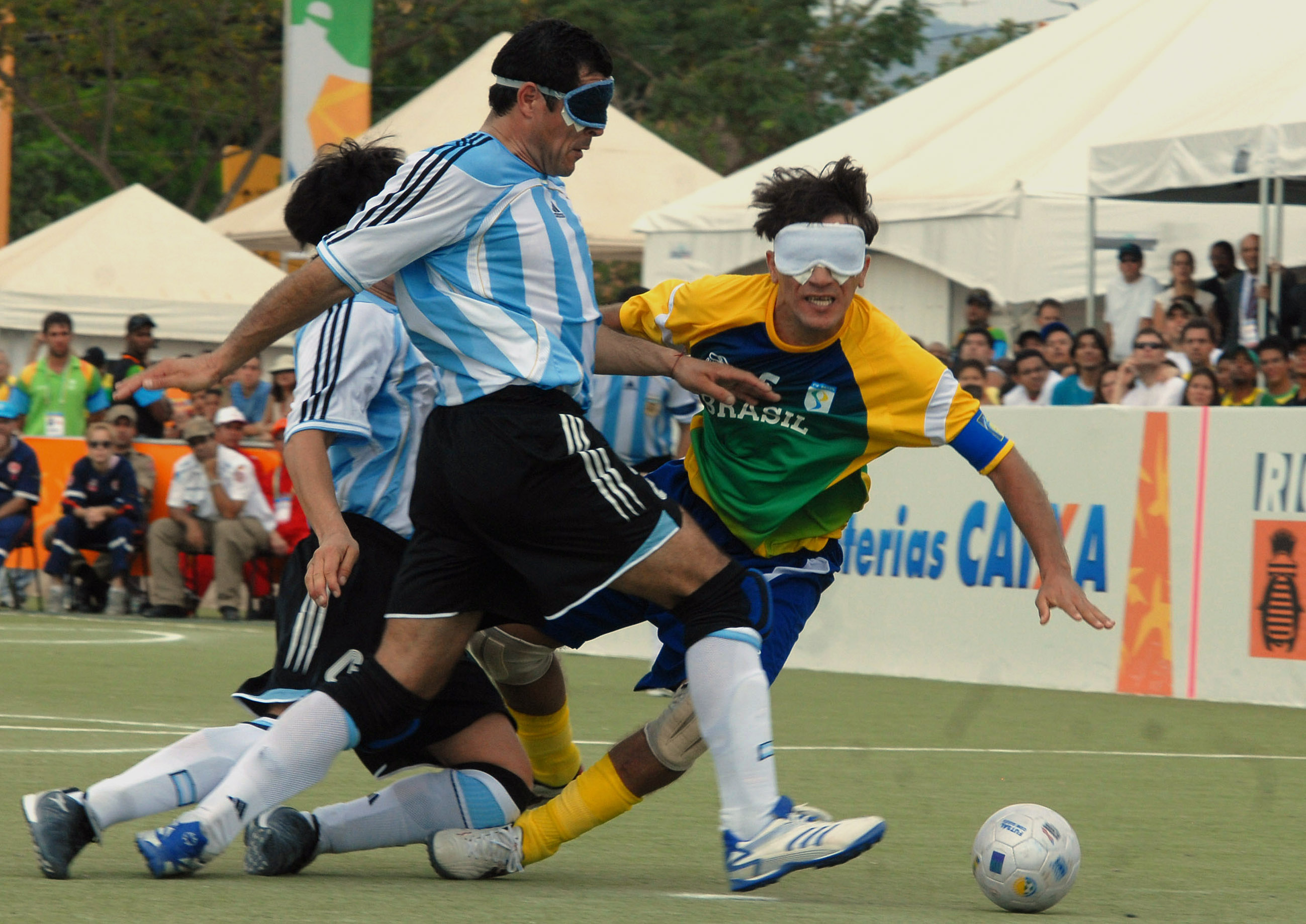
Brazil vs. Argentina in the para football final of the 2007 Parapan American Games in Rio de Janeiro

Para football is a collective term used to describe various forms of association football adapted for athletes with disabilities. It encompasses several disciplines governed by different international organizations and is played under modified rules depending on the type of impairment.

Para football is part of the broader Paralympic and disability sport movement and aims to provide inclusive opportunities for athletes with physical, sensory, or intellectual impairments.

== Disciplines ==
Para football includes multiple formats, such as:

- Paralympic football – including:
  - 5-a-side football (for visually impaired athletes)
  - 7-a-side football (for athletes with cerebral palsy; discontinued after 2016)
- Amputee football
- Blind football
- Cerebral palsy football
- Deaf football
- Intellectual disability football
- Powerchair football

Each discipline has its own governing body, classification system, and competition structure.

== Governance ==
Different organizations oversee para football disciplines globally. For example, several formats are recognized by the International Paralympic Committee, while others are governed by independent federations.

== Competitions ==
Major para football competitions include the Paralympic Games, world championships organized by respective federations, and regional tournaments.

The world championships in para football are:

- Amputee Football World Cup
- World Blind Football Championships
- World Deaf Football Championships
- IFCPF Women's World Cup
- IFCPF World Cup
- INAS World Football Championships
- FIPFA World Cup
