= Swimming at the 2017 Summer Deaflympics =

Deaflympics event

Swimming at the 2017 Summer Deaflympics in Samsun, Turkey took place at Atakum Olympic Swimming Pool.

== Medal summary ==
Rank	NOC	Gold	Silver	Bronze	Total
1	Russia (RUS)	26	10	8	44
2	Japan (JPN)	3	7	5	15
3	Belarus (BLR)	3	3	0	6
4	United States (USA)	3	2	3	8
5	Great Britain (GBR)	3	0	4	7
6	Poland (POL)	1	1	6	8
7	Brazil (BRA)	1	0	1	2
8	Ukraine (UKR)	0	8	9	17
9	China (CHN)	0	4	1	5
10	Italy (ITA)	0	2	2	4
11	South Africa (RSA)	0	2	0	2
12	Indonesia (INA)	0	1	1	2
Totals (12 entries)		40	40	40	120

== Medalists ==
* Indicates the athlete only competed in the preliminary heats and received medals.

=== Men ===
Event	Gold	Silver	Bronze
50 m Freestyle	Andrei Zhivaev; Russia	Matthew James Klotz; United States	Ilya Eduardovich Sarykin; Russia
100 m Freestyle	Miron Mikhaylovi Denisov; Russia	Andrei Zhivaev; Russia	Guilherme Maia Kabbach; Brazil
200 m Freestyle	Guilherme Maia Kabbach; Brazil	Satoi Fujihara; Japan	Miron Mikhaylovi Denisov; Russia
400 m Freestyle	Satoi Fujihara; Japan	Artur Zbigniew Pioro; Poland	Federico Tamborrino; Italy
1500 m Freestyle	Satoi Fujihara; Japan	Federico Tamborrino; Italy	Artur Zbigniew Pioro; Poland
50 m Backstroke	Matthew Klotz; United States	Igor Sergeevic Zhuravlev; Russia	Yoshikazu Kanaji; Japan
100 m Backstroke	Matthew Klotz; United States	Yoshikazu Kanaji; Japan	Igor Sergeevic Zhuravlev; Russia
200 m Backstroke	Matthew Klotz; United States	Yoshikazu Kanaji; Japan	Juliusz Sawka; Poland
50 m Breaststroke	Martin Robertovich Fomin; Russia	Oleksii Kolomiiets; Ukraine	Jack Gordon Mccomish; Great Britain
100 m Breaststroke	Jack Gordon Mccomish; Great Britain	Martin Robertovich Fomin; Russia	Ilham Achmad Turmudzi; Indonesia
200 m Breaststroke	Martin Robertovich Fomin; Russia	Ilham Achmad Turmudzi; Indonesia	Jack Gordon Mccomish; Great Britain
50 m Butterfly	Andrei Zhivaev; Russia	Matthew Klotz; United States	Ilia Mikhailovi Trishkin; Russia
100 m Butterfly	Andrei Zhivaev; Russia	Luca Germano; Italy	Ilia Mikhailovi Trishkin; Russia
200 m Butterfly	Konrad Powroznik; Poland	Satoi Fujihara; Japan	Luca Germano; Italy
200 m Individual Medley	Vitalii Alexandro Obotin; Russia	Ryutaro Ibara; Japan	Satoi Fujihara; Japan
400 m Individual Medley	Satoi Fujihara; Japan	Vitalii Alexandro Obotin; Russia	Ryutaro Ibara; Japan
4 × 100 m Freestyle Relay	Russia; Ilya Eduardovich Sarykin; Andrei Zhivaev; Vitalii Alexandro Obotin; Miron Mikhaylovi Denisov; Igor Sergeevic Zhuravlev*; Ilya Lukyanov*; Martin Robertovich Fomin*; Ilia Mikhailovi Trishkin*	Ukraine; Oleksii Lytvynenko; Viktor Konkin; Maksym Dudnyk; Denys Bystrevskyi; Artem Karnysh*; Yevhen Zaulichnyi*; Ivan Zinenko*; Oleksii Kolomiiets*	Japan; Satoi Fujihara; Ryutaro Ibara; Yuta Tsuda; Yoshikazu Kanaji; Taiga Hoshi*
4 × 200 m Freestyle Relay	Russia; Andrei Zhivaev; Leonid Aleksandr Grishin; Miron Mikhaylovi Denisov; Vitalii Alexandro Obotin; Roman Lavrov*; Martin Robertovich Fomin*; Filipp Torishnii*; Ilia Mikhailovi Trishkin*	Japan; Satoi Fujihara; Yoshikazu Kanaji; Ryutaro Ibara; Yuta Tsuda; Taiga Hoshi*	Poland; Juliusz Sawka; Jakub Kramarczyk; Konrad Powroznik; Artur Zbigniew Pioro
4 × 100 m Medley Relay	Russia; Igor Sergeevic Zhuravlev; Martin Robertovich Fomin; Andrei Zhivaev; Miron Mikhaylovi Denisov; Vitalii Alexandro Obotin*; Denis Martynenko*; Ilya Lukyanov*; Roman Lavrov*	Japan; Yoshikazu Kanaji; Ryutaro Ibara; Yuta Tsuda; Satoi Fujihara; Taiga Hoshi*	Ukraine; Maksym Dudnyk; Oleksii Kolomiiets; Rostyslav Iakubovskyi; Denys Bystrevskyi; Viktor Konkin*; Filipp Izhachenko*; Oleksii Lytvynenko*

=== Women ===
Event	Gold	Silver	Bronze
50 m Freestyle	Danielle Joyce; Great Britain	Eleonora Brykanova; Russia	Mariya Rezhylo; Ukraine
100 m Freestyle	Danielle Joyce; Great Britain	Viktoriia Terenteva; Russia	Mariya Rezhylo; Ukraine
200 m Freestyle	Viktoriia Terenteva; Russia	Hu Yuchen; China	Mariya Rezhylo; Ukraine
400 m Freestyle	Viktoriia Terenteva; Russia	Hu Yuchen; China	Alyssa Greymont; United States
800 m Freestyle	Viktoriia Terenteva; Russia	Hu Yuchen; China	Peng Huidi; China
50 m Backstroke	Olga Kliuchnikova; Russia	Eleonora Vyach Brykanova; Russia	Danielle Joyce; Great Britain
100 m Backstroke	Olga Kliuchnikova; Russia	Eleonora Vyach Brykanova; Russia	Kateryna Denysova; Ukraine
200 m Backstroke	Olga Kliuchnikova; Russia	Kateryna Denysova; Ukraine	Emily Massengale; United States
50 m Breaststroke	Aksana Petrushenka; Belarus	Iryna Tereshchenko; Ukraine	Julia Chmielewska; Poland
100 m Breaststroke	Aksana Petrushenka; Belarus	Natalia Deeva; Belarus	Julia Chmielewska; Poland
200 m Breaststroke	Aksana Petrushenka; Belarus	Kristina Shaiakhmetova; Russia	Julia Chmielewska; Poland
50 m Butterfly	Alena Sergeevna Alexeeva; Russia	Mariya Rezhylo; Ukraine	Ekaterina Alex Savchenko; Russia
100 m Butterfly	Alena Sergeevna Alexeeva; Russia	Cornell Loubser; South Africa	Ekaterina Alex Savchenko; Russia
200 m Butterfly	Polina Bilalova; Russia	Cornell Loubser; South Africa	Ekaterina Alex Savchenko; Russia
200 m Individual Medley	Olga Kliuchnikova; Russia	Polina Bilalova; Russia	Iryna Tereshchenko; Ukraine
400 m Individual Medley	Polina Bilalova; Russia	Iryna Tereshchenko; Ukraine	Emily Massengale; United States
4 × 100 m Freestyle Relay	Russia; Maria Karpova; Alena Sergeevna Alexeeva; Viktoriia Terenteva; Eleonora Vyach Brykanova	Belarus; Katsiaryna Eramtsova; Hanna Kuzmich; Aksana Petrushenka; Anastasiya Filipchyk	Ukraine; Kateryna Denysova; Daria Tarasenko; Iryna Tereshchenko; Mariya Rezhylo
4 × 200 m Freestyle Relay	Russia; Maria Karpova; Ekaterina Alex Savchenko; Eleonora Vyach Brykanova; Viktoriia Terenteva	China; Shen Ying; Zhu Qian; Hu Yuchen; Peng Huidi	Ukraine; Krystyna Davydova; Daria Tarasenko; Iryna Tereshchenko; Mariya Rezhylo
4 × 100 m Medley Relay	Russia; Olga Kliuchnikova; Ekaterina Kulikova; Ekaterina Alex Savchenko; Viktoriia Terenteva	Belarus; Maryia Rudzko; Aksana Petrushenka; Katsiaryna Eramtsova; Anastasiya Filipchyk	Ukraine; Kateryna Denysova; Iryna Tereshchenko; Kateryna Ivanenko; Mariya Rezhylo

=== Mixed ===
Event	Gold	Silver	Bronze
4 × 100 m Freestyle Relay	Russia; Vitalii Alexandro Obotin; Miron Mikhaylovi Denisov; Maria Karpova; Eleonora Vyach Brykanova; Ekaterina Alex Savchenko*; Maria Eduardovn Kalinina*; Andrei Zhivaev*; Ilya Eduardovich Sarykin*	Ukraine; Maksym Dudnyk; Kateryna Denysova; Mariya Rezhylo; Denys Bystrevskyi; Viktor Konkin*; Iryna Tereshchenko*; Oleksii Lytvynenko*; Krystyna Davydova*	Great Britain; Nathan Young; Danielle Joyce; Shiona Mcclafferty; Jack Gordon Mccomish; Jasmine Seamarks*; Thomas John Baxter*
4 × 100 m Medley Relay	Russia; Alena Sergeevna Alexeeva; Martin Robertovich Fomin; Andrei Zhivaev; Maria Karpova; Viktoriia Terenteva*; Ilia Mikhailovi Trishkin*; Ilya Lukyanov*; Eleonora Vyach Brykankova*	Ukraine; Kateryna Denysova; Oleksii Kolomiiets; Rostyslav Iakubovskyi; Mariya Rezhylo; Artem Karnysh*; Kateryna Ivanenko*; Iryna Tereshchenko*; Maksym Dudnyk*	Japan; Yoshikazu Kanaji; Minami Kubo; Ayaka Fujikawa; Ryutaro Ibara
