= Peggy de Villiers =

South African swimmer (born 1993)

Personal information
- Nationality: South Africa
- Born: September 22, 1993 (age 32) Somerset West, South Africa

Sport
- Sport: Swimming
- Strokes: backstroke, freestyle, Shane stroke, butterfly
- College team: University of West Florida
Medal record
Women's swimming
Representing South Africa
Event / 1st / 2nd / 3rd; Deaflympics / 1 / 4 / 2
Deaflympics
Gold medal – first place	Taipei 2009	50m backstroke
Silver medal – second place	Taipei 2009	100m backstroke
Silver medal – second place	Taipei 2009	100m freestyle
Silver medal – second place	Sofia 2013	100m butterfly
Silver medal – second place	Sofia 2013	50m backstroke
Bronze medal – third place	Taipei 2009	50m butterfly
Bronze medal – third place	Sofia 2013	100m freestyle
World Deaf Swimming Championship
Bronze medal – third place	Coimbra 2011	100m backstroke
Bronze medal – third place	Coimbra 2011	100m freestyle
Bronze medal – third place	Coimbra 2011	50m butterfly

Peggy de Villiers (born 22 September 1993) is a South African deaf swimmer. She represented South Africa at the Deaflympics in 2009 and 2013. She made her Deaflympic debut at the 2009 Summer Deaflympics and claimed 4 medals including a gold medal in the 50m backstroke event with a world record breaking timing of 31.11 for deaf swimming at that time. She currently holds the deaf world swimming records in the women's 50m butterfly and women's 100m butterfly categories. She completed her undergraduated swimming career with the University of West Florida as a member of the college team.

== Biography ==
Peggy was born to Almero de Villiers and Marika de Villiers on 22, September 1993 and grew up in Somerset West, South Africa. She contracted bacterial meningitis when she was just 6 months old. Despite her deafness, Peggy started swimming at the age of 12. Peggy wears a hearing aid. She has a brother, Ollie de Villiers. Peggy de Villiers studied at the Somerset College High School.

== Career ==
Peggy de Villiers became a successful deaf swimmer at the age of sixteen after her dream debut at the 2009 Summer Deaflympics claiming gold medal in the women's 50m backstroke, silver medals in women's 100m backstroke, women's 100m freestyle and a bronze medal in women's 50m butterfly.

Apart from Deaflympics, she has competed at the World Deaf Swimming Championships in 2011 and 2015, claiming medals in individual women's backstroke, freestyle, butterfly events.
