= Natalia Deeva =

Belarusian swimmer (born 1979)

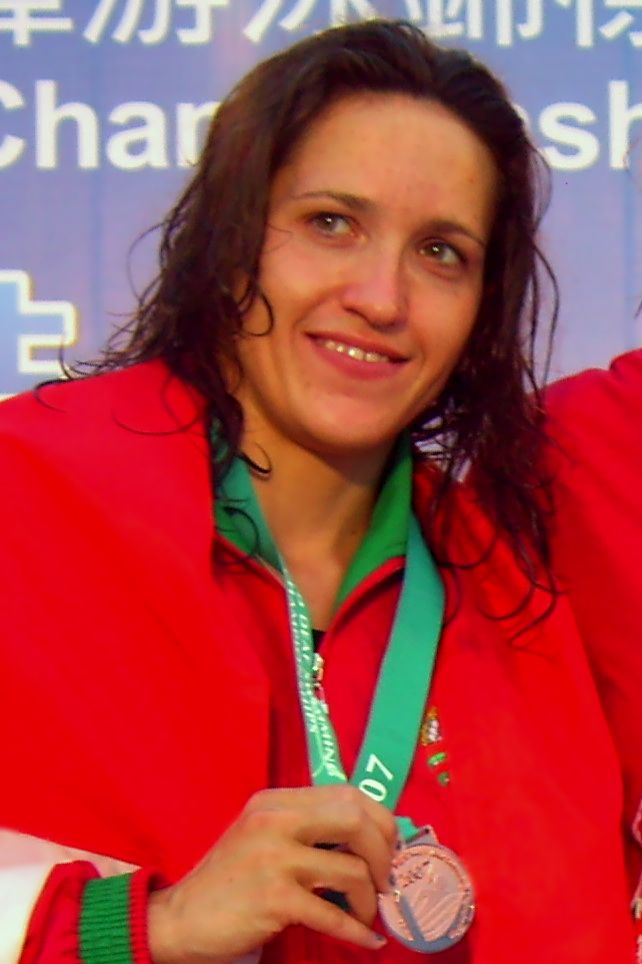
- Natalia Deeva winning the 2007 ICSD Deaf Sportswoman of the Year award

Personal information
- Nationality: Belarus
- Born: December 29, 1979 (age 46)

Sport
- Sport: Swimming
Medal record
Representing Belarus
Women's Swimming
Deaflympics
Gold medal – first place	Taipei 2009	4x100m medley relay
Gold medal – first place	Taipei 2009	50m breaststroke
Gold medal – first place	Sofia 2013	100m breaststroke
Gold medal – first place	Sofia 2013	4x100m medley relay
Silver medal – second place	Taipei 2009	100m breaststroke
Silver medal – second place	Taipei 2009	200m breaststroke
Silver medal – second place	Sofia 2013	50m breaststroke
Silver medal – second place	Sofia 2013	200m breaststroke
Silver medal – second place	Samsun 2017	100m breaststroke
Bronze medal – third place	Rome 2001	100m breaststroke
Bronze medal – third place	Rome 2001	4x100m freestyle relay
Bronze medal – third place	Melbourne 2005	4x100m medley relay
Bronze medal – third place	Melbourne 2005	4x200m freestyle relay

Natalia Deeva (born 29 December 1979) is a Belarusian deaf female swimmer. She has competed at the Deaflympics on six occasions, the most appearances by a Deaflympic competitor representing Belarus at the Deaflympics. She is notable for breaking three deaf swimming world records in a single day at the 2007 World Deaf Swimming Championships.

== Career ==
Natalia made her Deaflympic debut at the age of 17 in the 1997 Summer Deaflympics which was held in Copenhagen. Since then, she has never missed a single Deaflympic event as she further competed at the multi-sport event in 2001, 2005, 2009, 2013 and 2017. Natalia has claimed 13 medals in her Deaflympic career, including four gold medals.

Natalia was awarded the ICSD Deaf Sportswoman of the Year award in 2007 after breaking three deaf swimming world records while clinching three gold medals in a single day. However her deaf world records which were set by her in 2007 later shattered at the 2011 World Deaf Swimming Championships.

=== 2001 Summer Deaflympics ===
After making her Deaflympic debut at the 1997 Summer Deaflympics, she went onto participate at the Rome Deaflympics claiming bronze medals in the women's 100m breaststroke and women's 4 × 100 m freestyle relay events.

=== 2009 Summer Deaflympics ===
Natalia Deeva managed to claim her first Deaflympic gold medal in the women's 50m breaststroke event. She also claimed gold medal in the women's 4 × 100 m medley relay event.
