= South Africa at the 2017 Summer Deaflympics =

- IOC code: RSA
- NOC: South African Deaf Sports Federation
- Website: www.sadeafsport.com

in Samsun
- Competitors: 4 in 2 sports
- Medals Ranked 35th: Gold 0 Silver 2 Bronze 0 Total 2

Summer Deaflympics appearances (overview)
- 1993; 1997; 2001; 2005; 2009; 2013; 2017; 2021

South Africa competed in the 2017 Summer Deaflympics for the 7th consecutive time in the Summer Deaflympics since making its debut in 1993.

South Africa sent a delegation of just 4 participants in the Games including 3 swimmers and an athlete. South African team received 2 silver medals in the competition. Cornell Loubser was the only medalist for South Africa during the event bagging 2 silver medals.

== Participants ==
Sport	Men	Women	Total
Swimming	1	2	3
Athletics	1	0	1

== Medalists ==
Name	Medal	Sport	Event
Cornell Loubser	Silver	Swimming	Women's Butterfly 100m
Cornell Loubser	Silver	Swimming	Women's Butterfly 200m

== Medal table ==
Sport	Gold	Silver	Bronze	Total
Swimming	0	2	0	2
Athletics	0	0	0	0
