= 2008 World Deaf Football Championships =

Tournament details
- Host country: Greece
- City: Patras
- Dates: 1-12 July
- Teams: 15 men's and 5 women's (from International Committee of Sports for the Deaf (CISS) confederations)

Final positions
- Champions: M: Germany (1st title); W: Russia (1st title)
- Runners-up: M: Turkey; W: Germany
- Third place: M: France; W: England
- Fourth place: M: United States; W: South Africa

Tournament statistics
- Best player: M: (Turkey) Hüseyin Er

The 2008 World Deaf Football Championships were the first edition of the international competition of deaf football national men's and women's teams. They were organized by the International Committee of Sports for the Deaf (CISS), and were held in Patras, Greece between 1-12 July 2008. In the men's championship, Germany won the title for the first time, defeating Turkey in the final, France became bronze medalist before the United States. In the women's championship, Russia won the title for the first time, defeating Germany in the final, England became bronze medalist before South Africa.

== Rankings ==
=== Men ===
Rank	Team
1	Germany
2	Turkey
3	France
4	United States
5	Greece
6	Ireland
7	Russia
8	Italy
9	Ukraine
10	Thailand
11	England
12	Netherlands
13	Australia
14	China
15	Venezuela

2008 World Deaf Football Championships - Men

Germany
First title

=== Women ===
Rank	Team
1	Russia
2	Germany
3	England
4	South Africa
5	Greece

2008 World Deaf Football Championships - Women

Russia
First title
