= Cornell Loubser =

South African swimmer (born 1994)

Personal information
- Nationality: South Africa
- Born: July 27, 1994 (age 31) Potchefstroom, South Africa

Sport
- Sport: Swimming
Medal record
Representing South Africa
Women's Swimming
Deaflympics
Silver medal – second place	Samsun 2017	100m butterfly
Silver medal – second place	Samsun 2017	200m butterfly

Cornell Loubser (born 27 July 1994) is a South African female deaf swimmer. She represented South Africa at the Deaflympics in 2013 and 2017. Cornell has also won medals in the South African national deaf swimming championships and in the 2015 World Deaf Swimming Championship.

She was also the solitary medalist for South Africa at the 2017 Summer Deaflympics as she claimed silver medals in the women's 100m butterfly and 200m butterfly events.
