= Amy Griffin =

American soccer coach and former player (born 1965)

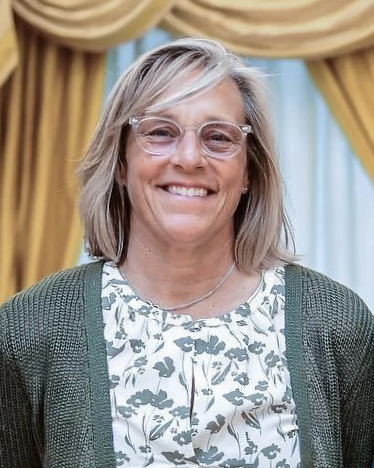

Personal information
- Full name: Amy Griffin
- Birth name: Amy Allmann
- Date of birth: October 25, 1965 (age 61)
- Height: 5 ft 4 in (1.63 m)
- Position: Goalkeeper

College career
Years	Team	Apps	(Gls)
1984–1987	UCF Knights		

International career
1987–1991	United States	24	(0)

Managerial career
- 1987–1988: UCF Knights (assistant)
- 1989–1991: Santa Clara Broncos (assistant)
- 1991–1992: San Diego Toreros (assistant)
- 1993–1995: New Mexico Lobos
- 1996–2004: Washington Huskies (assistant)
- 2005–2019: Washington Huskies (associate head coach)
- 2010: United States U17 (assistant)
- 2012–2014: United States U20 (assistant)
- 2015: United States U23 (assistant)
Medal record
FIFA Women's World Cup
Gold medal – first place	1991 China

Amy Griffin (née Allmann; born October 25, 1965) is an American soccer coach and former player. As a player, Griffin played for the United States women's national soccer team and won the 1991 FIFA Women's World Cup. She is currently the head coach of the United States women's national deaf soccer team.

== Early life ==
Griffin grew up in Federal Way, Washington, where she attended Decatur High School and played for the club soccer team, F.C. Royals.

=== University of Central Florida ===
Griffin attended the University of Central Florida where she played goalkeeper for the Knights from 1984 to 1987. In 1987, she was named NCAA's Adidas Goalkeeper of the Year. Griffin and teammate Michelle Akers helped lead UCF to three NCAA Tournament appearances, including a trip to the Final Four in 1987.

Griffin was inducted into the Central Florida Hall of Fame in 1999, the school's second women's soccer honoree. The first was her teammate at UCF, Michelle Akers.

== Playing career ==
=== International ===
Griffin played for the United States women's national soccer team from 1987 to 1991 and was on the squad that won the first ever FIFA Women's World Cup in 1991. In 23 career national team starts (with 24 caps), she posted a 12–8–3 record with a 0.99 goals against average.

=== International career statistics ===
United States
Year	Apps	Goals
1987	9	0
1988	7	0
1989	–	–
1990	2	0
1991	6	0
Total	24	0

== Coaching career ==
Griffin was one of the first nine women to obtain a United States Soccer Federation (USSF) level "A" coaching license. She is active in the Olympic Development program and coached at the 1995 U.S. Olympic Sports Festival. In 1998, she became a staff coach for both the NSCAA and the U.S. Soccer Federation.

Griffin was head coach at the University of New Mexico where she started the program in 1993. The New Mexico Lobos posted a 27–24–1 record under Griffin, including a 10–7–3 mark in 1995 en route to a second-place finish in the Western Athletic Conference. Prior to that, she served as assistant coach at San Diego State University. Griffin later re-joined Lesle Gallimore, former head coach at San Diego State, at the University of Washington and has spent over a decade with the Huskies, most recently as associate head coach.

Griffin was an assistant coach at Santa Clara University from 1989 to 1991. She was also an assistant coach at her alma mater, University of Central Florida.

In 2012, Griffin was a goalkeeper coach for the United States under-20 women's national soccer team and helped guide the team to gold at the 2012 FIFA U-20 Women's World Cup.

In 2015, Griffin was announced as the new head coach of the United States women's national deaf soccer team.

Griffin is also currently the executive director of the Seattle Reign Academy in Seattle, Washington.

== Personal life ==
Griffin lives in Seattle, Washington, alongside her husband Jack and their two sons, Nick, born in 2001, and Ben, born in 2003.

== Broadcasting career ==
Griffin served as broadcast commentator with NBC, ESPN and Fox Network. She provided analysis for ESPN2 during the 1995 and 1999 women's soccer World Cups and was the color analyst with Andrés Cantor for NBC's 2000 Sydney Olympic coverage.

== Health concerns with artificial turf ==
Amy Griffin has played an important role by bringing forward concerns about the health of women soccer players, particularly goal keepers. She collected data about athletes with cancer who have played on artificial turf containing "crumb rubber". As of 2015, her list of 200 athletes with cancer contained 150 soccer players, 95 of whom were goalkeepers.
