= Mexico at the Deaflympics =

- IPC code: MEX
- Website: {{URL|example.com|optional display text}}
- Medals: Gold 3 Silver 3 Bronze 3 Total 9

Summer appearances
- 1965; 1969; 1973; 1977; 1981; 1985; 1989; 1993; 1997; 2001; 2005; 2009; 2013; 2017; 2021

Mexico has been participating at the Deaflympics since making its debut way back in 1965. Mexico won its first Deaflympic medal in the 2001 Summer Deaflympics for Athletics. In the 2017 Summer Deaflympics, Mexico won its first ever gold medal in Deaflympics history for Judo.

Mexico yet to make its debut in the Winter Deaflympics.

== Summer Deaflympics ==
Event	Gold	Silver	Bronze	Total
1965	0	0	0	0
1969	0	0	0	0
1977	0	0	0	0
1981	0	0	0	0
1985	0	0	0	0
1997	0	0	0	0
2001	0	2	1	3
2009	0	0	1	1
2013	0	0	1	1
2017	1	0	0	1
2021	2	1	0	3

=== Medals by Summer Sport ===
Sport	Gold	Silver	Bronze	Total
Judo	2	0	0	2
Athletics	1	3	2	6
Taekwondo	0	0	1	1
Totals (3 entries)	3	3	3	9

== See also ==
- Mexico at the Olympics
- Mexico at the Paralympics
