= Fırat Kaya =

German-born Turkish footballer (born 1995)

Personal information
- Date of birth: 2 January 1995 (age 31)
- Place of birth: Schwäbisch Hall, Germany
- Position: Right wing

Youth career
- 2010–2013: VfR Mannheim

Senior career*
Years	Team	Apps	(Gls)
2013	Eintracht Plankstadt		
2014–2015	VfR Mannheim		
2015	SF Schwäbisch Hall		
2015	TSV Nellmersbach		
2015–2016	TSG Giengen		
2016–2017	SC 04 Schwabach		
2017–2018	TSV Kornburg		
2018	SF Schwäbisch Hall		
2019	Tokatspor	9	(2)
2019–2020	TSG Öhringen		
2020–2021	SV Fellbach		

International career
2013	Germany deaf	5	(1)
2017–	Turkey deaf	16	(15)
- * Club domestic league appearances and goals

Fırat Kaya (born 2 January 1995) is a Germany-born Turkish footballer. He is a member of the Turkey national deaf football team.

== Private life ==
Fırat Kaya was born to Turkish-descent parents, Yıldırım and Sevg, as the youngest of two children in Schwäbisch Hall, Germany on 2 January 1995. The hearing-impaired boy started to play football at a young age.

== Club career ==
At age 15, Kaya became an amateur footballer playing as a forward in the youth teams of VfR Mannheim (2010–2013). His professional career started with Eintracht Plankstadt (2013–14). He later played for the teams VfR Mannheim (2013–14), SF Schwäbisch Hall (2014–15), TSV Nellmersbach (2015–16), TSG Giengen (2015–16), SC 04 Schwabach (2016–17) and TSV Kornburg (2017–18. While playing again for SF Schwäbisch Hall (2018–19) in Germany, he moved to Turkey and signed a five-month contract with Tokatspor in January 2019. He played in nine matches of the 2018–19 TFF Second League's second half and scored two goals. He thus became the first hearing-loss footballer to play in the Turkish professional football leagues. After the end of the Turkish league season, the right-wing forward returned to Germany, and joined TSG Öhringen (2019–20). The next season, he signed a one-year contract with the Verbandsliga Württemberg club SV Fellbach (2020–21) in the beginning of September 2020. In his club career in Germany and Turkey between 2013 and 2021, he scored a total of 15 goals in 48 matches he played in the Bayernliga Süd, Landesliga Bayern-Süd/Oberbayern, Turkish TFF Second League, Verbandsliga Württemberg and Landespokal Württemberg.

== International career ==
Germany national deaf football team

Kaya became a member of the Germany national deaf football team, and participated at the 2013 Summer Deaflympics in Sofia, Bulgaria. He scored one goal in five matches. He enjoyed his team's third place.

Turkey national deaf football team

He later preferred to join the Turkey national deaf football team. He took part in all six matches of the 2017 Summer Deaflympics held in Samsun, Turkey. He scored one goal in the match against Venezuela, and another goal in the tournament's final match against Ukraine. He enjoyed his team's champion title. He played in the qualification group match for European Championship against England. He netted two goals in the match, which Turkey won by 5–0. He played in the qualification match for the EuroDeaf 2019 against Czech Republic in June 2018, and was instrumental for Turkey's qualification with 1-0 scoring the winning goal. He played in five matches at the Euro 2019 held in Heraklion, Greece. He was named "Top goalscorer" of the championship with 9 goals netted in four matches.

He played in two matches of the 2022 Summer Deaflympics qualification round against Czech Republic and France. He scored one goal in the match against Czech Republic, which ended 6-0 for Turkey. By defeatingboth teams, the national team qualified for the Games to be held in Caxias do Sul, Brazil.

International goals
Year	Competition	Opponent	Result	Goals	Ref
Germany national deaf football team
2013	Summer Deaflympics	Argentina	W 3-2	1	
2013	Summer Deaflympics	Iran	W 6-5	1	
Turkey national deaf football team
2017	Summer Deaflympics	Venezuela	W 3-0	1	
2017	Summer Deaflympics	Ukraine	W 4-3	1	
2017	EuroDeaf 2019 Qualification	England	W 5-0	2	
2018	EuroDeaf 2019 Qualification	Czech Republic	W 1-0	1	
2019	EuroDeaf	Denmark	W 6-1	7	
2019	EuroDeaf	Ireland	W 6-0	7	
2019	EuroDeaf	Hungary	W 8-0	7	
2019	EuroDeaf	Greece	L 2-4	7	
2019	EuroDeaf	England	W 2-0	7	
2019	EuroDeaf	Russia	W 2-1	2	
2021	2022 Summer Deaflympics Qualification	Czech Republic	W 6-0	1	

== Honours ==
=== Individual ===
Turkey national deaf football team
Top goalscorer (1): EuroDeaf 2019 (9 goals)

=== International ===
Germany national deaf football team
Third places (1): 2013 Summer Deaflympics

Turkey national deaf football team
Champions (1): 2017 Summer Deaflympics
