= FIPFA World Cup =

Powerchair football competition

The FIPFA World Cup (also known as the FIPFA Powerchair Football World Cup) is the premier international competition in powerchair football, organized by the Fédération Internationale de Powerchair Football Association (FIPFA).

The tournament features national teams from around the world and is considered the highest level of competition in the sport. It is held periodically and brings together leading teams in powerchair football, a variant of association football played by athletes using powered wheelchairs.

The first FIPFA World Cup was held in 2007 in Tokyo, Japan. Subsequent editions have taken place in countries such as France, the United States, and Australia. The United States won the first two editions (2007 and 2011), while France has been one of the most successful teams, including winning the 2017 and 2023 tournaments. The competition typically includes a group stage followed by knockout rounds, with national teams competing for the title of world champion.

== History ==
The first FIPFA World Cup was held in Tokyo, Japan in October 2007. The final was played on 13 October, with the United States beating France in a penalty shootout after drawing 1-1 during regulation and extra time. Belgium outlasted Japan and won on penalties to earn third place.

The second FIPFA World Cup was held November 2011 in Paris. The final was played on 6 November, with the United States beating England 3–0 in regulation. This was the first US team to win back-to-back world championships in football. France took third place after beating Belgium.

The third World Cup was held in 2017 in Kissimmee, Florida. The final was played on 9 July, with France beating the United States 4–2 in regulation. England bested Australia to take third place. Australian Abdullah Karim won the Most Valuable Player award.

The fourth World Cup opened in Sydney, Australia on 15 October 2023. It was originally scheduled for 2021 but was delayed until October 2022 due to the COVID-19 pandemic. In April 2022, with the continuation of the pandemic, the World Cup was postponed for another year until 2023. The final was played on 20 October, with France and England drawing 1–1 in regulation, before France won on penalties 2–1. The United States beat Argentina 2–1 to take third place.

The fifth World Cup will be held in Buenos Aires, Argentina in October 2026. Ten teams will take part in the tournament. The Italian preparations were hampered when they were unable to attend a warm up tournament held in Glasgow due to being unable to board their scheduled flight.

== Results ==
FIPFA World Cup results
Year	Host	1st	2nd	3rd	4th
2007	Tokyo	United States	France	Belgium	Japan
2011	Paris	United States	England	France	Belgium
2017	Kissimmee	France	United States	England	Australia
2023	Sydney	France	England	United States	Argentina
2026	Buenos Aires	France	England	United States	Argentina

== See also ==
- Powerchair football
- Para football
- Disability sport
