= EuroDeaf 2011 =

Football Competition

EuroDeaf 2011 2011 European Deaf Football Championships
Tournament details
- Host country: M: Denmark; W: Bulgaria
- City: M: Odense; W: Albena
- Dates: M: 27 June - 9 July; W: 6–11 June
- Teams: 12 men's and 3 women's (from IEuropean Deaf Sport Organization (EDSO) confederations)

Final positions
- Champions: M: Russia (1st title); W: Russia (1st title)
- Runners-up: M: Ukraine; W: Germany
- Third place: M: Germany; W: United Kingdom

The EuroDeaf 2011, short for the 2011 European Deaf Football Championships, was the seventh edition of the European competition of deaf football national teams for men, and the first edition for women. It was organized by the European Deaf Sport Organization (EDSO). The championship for men was held in Odense, Denmark between 27 June - 9 July, and the women's championship took place in Albena, Bulgaria between 6–11 June. 12 men's national teams, and 3 women's national teams competed. In the men's championship, Russia won the title for the first time, defeating Ukraine in the final, Germany placed third. In the women's championship, Russia won the title for the first time, defeating Germany in the final, Great Britain placed third.

== Participating nations ==
Men

- Belgium
- Denmark
- France
- Germany
- United Kingdom
- Ireland
- Italy
- Netherlands
- Poland
- Russia
- Turkey
- Ukraine

Women

- Germany
- United Kingdom
- Russia
