= U.S. Soccer Player of the Year =

Award given by the United States Soccer Federation

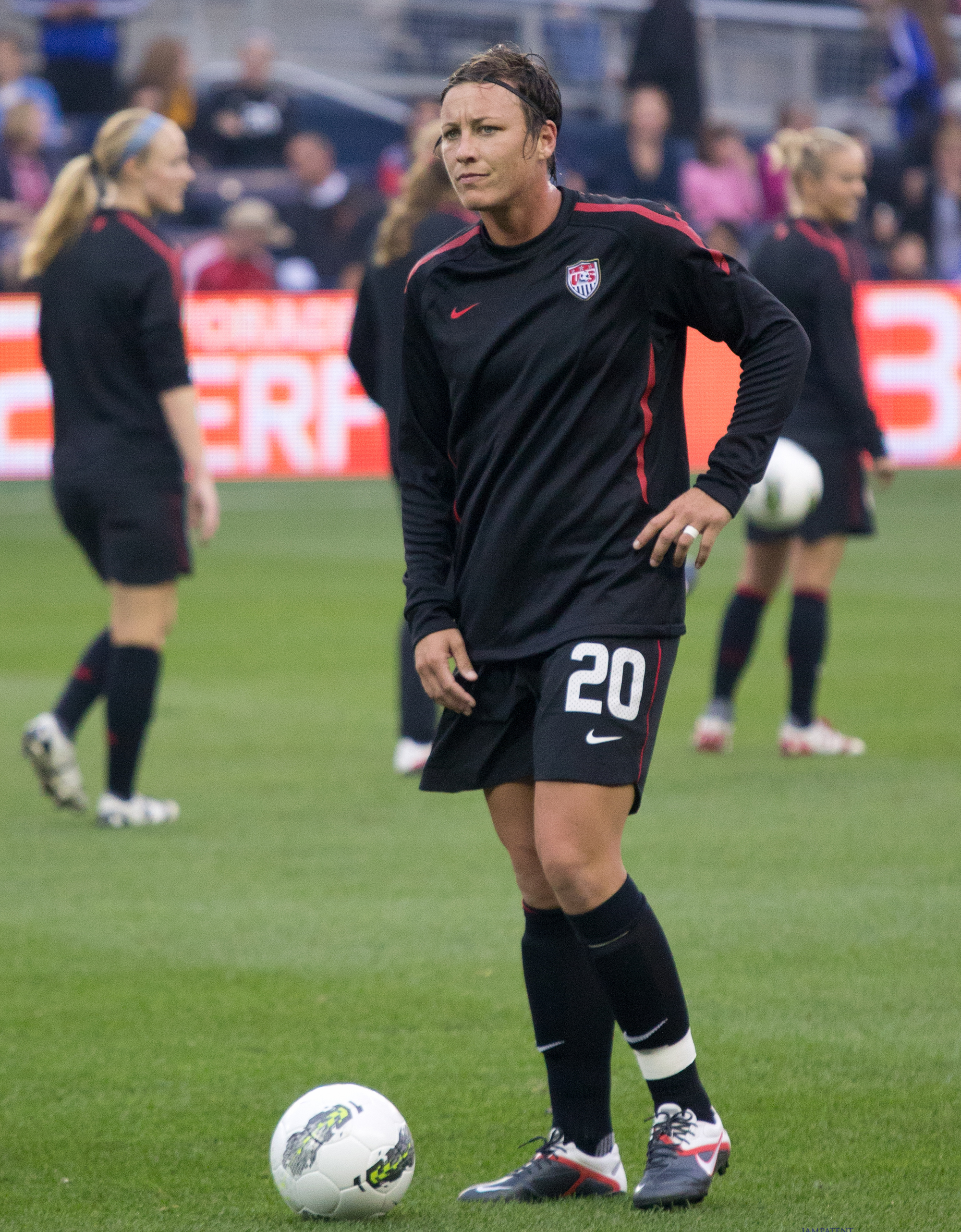
Abby Wambach has won the Female Player of the Year Award a record six times.

The U.S. Soccer Player of the Year is given by the United States Soccer Federation to the American soccer players judged best in the calendar year. It is considered the highest accolade for American soccer players.

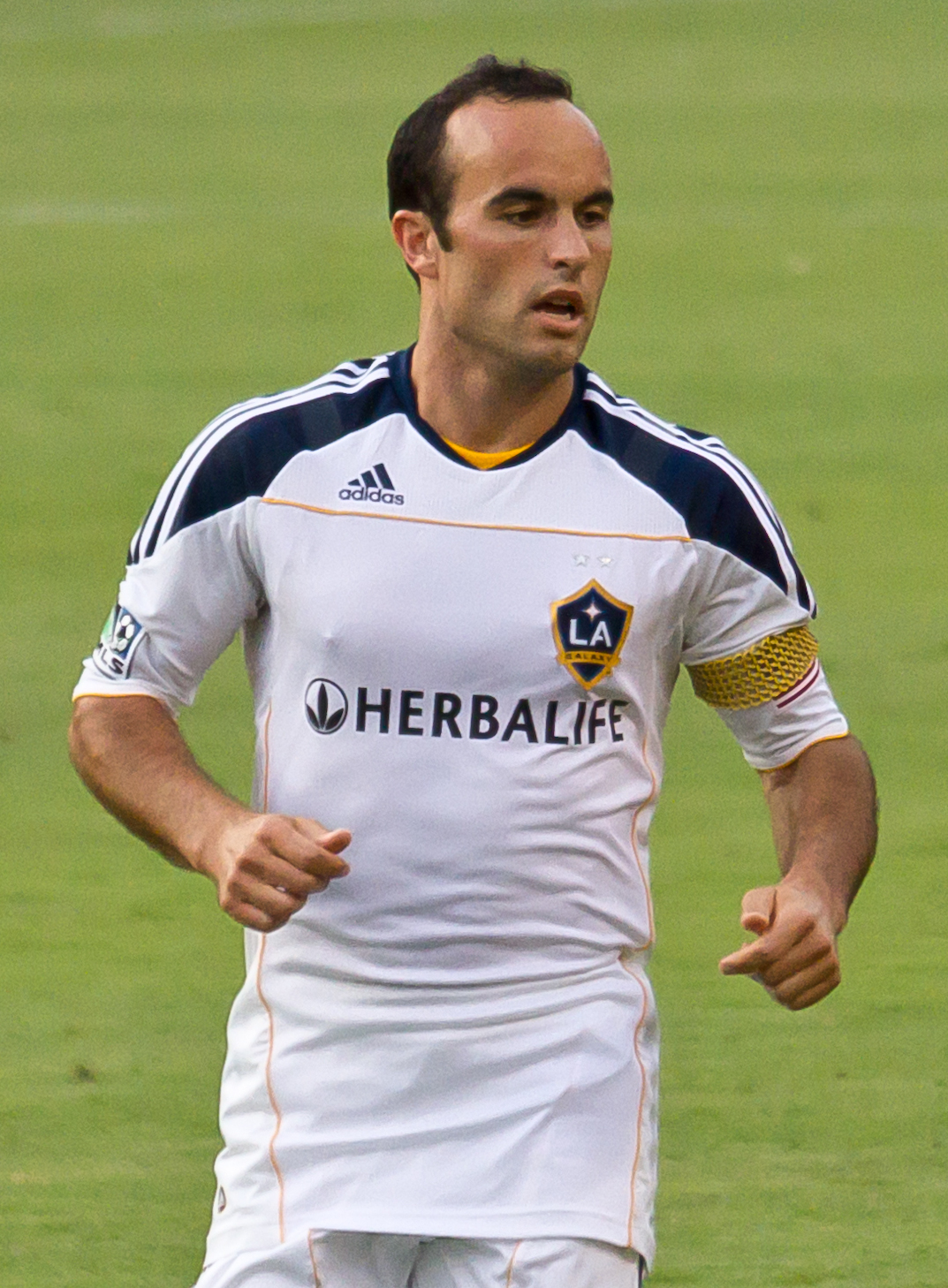
Landon Donovan has won the Male Player of the Year Award a joint-record four times.

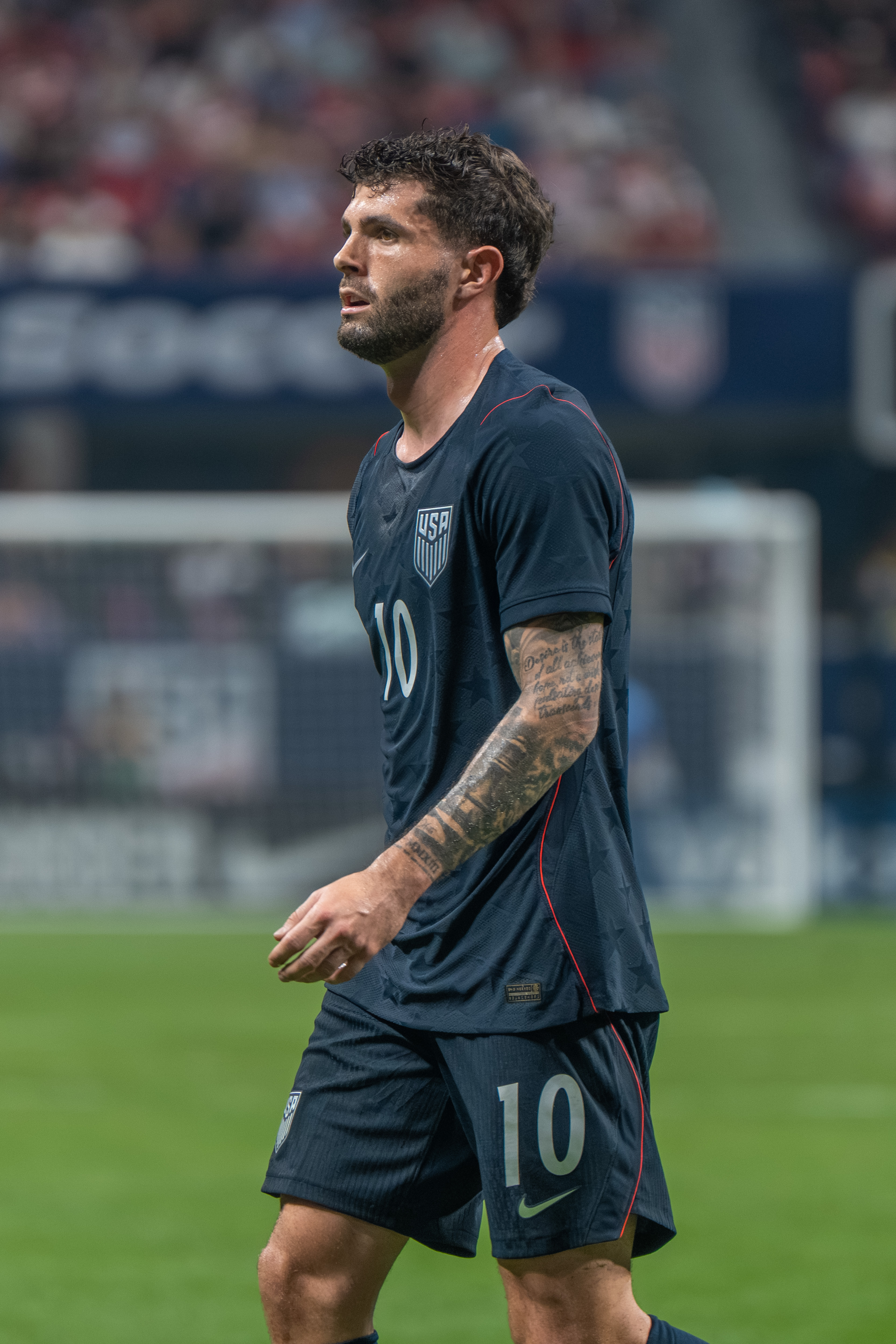
Christian Pulisic has won the Male Player of the Year Award a joint-record four times.

The U.S. Soccer Male Player of the Year award originated in 1984, followed by the Female Player of the Year in 1985. Awards for Young Male and Young Female Players were added in 1998. An award for Player of the Year with a Disability was added in 2012 but discontinued after 2020 and replaced with the non-player-specific "ADAPTandTHRIVE Disability Award," which "recognizes an individual making an impact in the United States' broad landscape of disability soccer." In 2021, awards for beach soccer and futsal were added. Public voting for the awards account for 50 percent of the results. The other 50 percent are voted by members of the national media and U.S. Soccer representatives (from national team coaches to the National Board of Directors).

Landon Donovan and Christian Pulisic are tied with four male awards each. Abby Wambach has won the female award a record six times.

== U.S. Soccer Players of the Year ==
As of January 16, 2026.

Year	Male Player of the Year	Female Player of the Year	Young Male Player of the Year	Young Female Player of the Year	Player of the Year with a Disability
1984	Rick Davis				
1985	Perry Van der Beck	Sharon McMurtry			
1986	Paul Caligiuri	April Heinrichs			
1987	Brent Goulet	Carin Jennings-Gabarra			
1988	Peter Vermes	Joy Biefield			
1989	Mike Windischmann	April Heinrichs (2)			
1990	Tab Ramos	Michelle Akers			
1991	Hugo Perez	Michelle Akers (2)			
1992	Marcelo Balboa	Carin Jennings-Gabarra (2)			
1993	Thomas Dooley	Kristine Lilly			
1994	Marcelo Balboa (2)	Mia Hamm			
1995	Alexi Lalas	Mia Hamm (2)			
1996	Eric Wynalda	Mia Hamm (3)			
1997	Kasey Keller	Mia Hamm (4)			
1998	Cobi Jones	Mia Hamm (5)	Josh Wolff	Cindy Parlow	
1999	Kasey Keller (2)	Michelle Akers (3)	Ben Olsen	Lorrie Fair	
2000	Chris Armas	Tiffeny Milbrett	Landon Donovan	Aly Wagner	
2001	Earnie Stewart	Tiffeny Milbrett (2)	DaMarcus Beasley	Aleisha Cramer	
2002	Brad Friedel	Shannon MacMillan	Bobby Convey	Lindsay Tarpley	
2003	Landon Donovan	Abby Wambach	Freddy Adu	Cat Reddick	
2004	Landon Donovan (2)	Abby Wambach (2)	Eddie Johnson	Heather O'Reilly	
2005	Kasey Keller (3)	Kristine Lilly (2)	Benny Feilhaber	Lori Chalupny	
2006	Oguchi Onyewu	Kristine Lilly (3)	Jozy Altidore	Danesha Adams	
2007	Clint Dempsey	Abby Wambach (3)	Michael Bradley	Lauren Cheney	
2008	Tim Howard	Carli Lloyd	Sacha Kljestan	Kristie Mewis	
2009	Landon Donovan (3)	Hope Solo	Luis Gil	Tobin Heath	
2010	Landon Donovan (4)	Abby Wambach (4)	Gale Agbossoumonde	Bianca Henninger	
2011	Clint Dempsey (2)	Abby Wambach (5)	Brek Shea	Sydney Leroux	
2012	Clint Dempsey (3)	Alex Morgan	Rubio Rubin	Julie Johnston	Felicia Schroeder
2013	Jozy Altidore	Abby Wambach (6)	Wil Trapp	Lindsey Horan	Rene Renteria
2014	Tim Howard (2)	Lauren Holiday	DeAndre Yedlin	Morgan Brian	Gavin Sibayan
2015	Michael Bradley	Carli Lloyd (2)	Matt Miazga	Mallory Pugh	Kevin Hensley
2016	Jozy Altidore (2)	Tobin Heath	Christian Pulisic	Ashley Sanchez	Adam Ballou
2017	Christian Pulisic	Julie Ertz	Josh Sargent	Sophia Smith	Sean Boyle
2018	Zack Steffen	Alex Morgan (2)	Alex Mendez	Tierna Davidson	Gracie Fitzgerald
2019	Christian Pulisic (2)	Julie Ertz (2)	Sergiño Dest	Brianna Pinto	Nick Mayhugh
2020	Weston McKennie	Sam Mewis	Gio Reyna	Naomi Girma	CP Soccer youth players
2021	Christian Pulisic (3)	Lindsey Horan	Ricardo Pepi	Trinity Rodman	
2022	Tyler Adams	Sophia Smith	Yunus Musah	Jaedyn Shaw	
2023	Christian Pulisic (4)	Naomi Girma	Kevin Paredes	Olivia Moultrie	
2024	Antonee Robinson	Alyssa Naeher	Tanner Tessmann	Ally Sentnor	
2025	Chris Richards	Rose Lavelle	Benjamin Cremaschi	Lilly Reale	

=== Multiple winners ===
Landon Donovan and Christian Pulisic are the only male players to win the award four times. Marcelo Balboa was the first player to win the award twice, in 1992 and 1994, and Kasey Keller was the first player to win the award three times (1997, 1999 and 2005). Landon Donovan (2003 and 2004; 2009 and 2010) and Clint Dempsey (2011 and 2012) are the only players to have won the award in consecutive seasons.

Abby Wambach is the only female player to win the award six times, closely followed by Mia Hamm with 5. April Heinrichs was the first player to win the award twice, in 1986 and 1989, Mia Hamm was the first player to win the award three, four, and five times, and Abby Wambach was the first and only player to win the award six times. Hamm is the only player to have won the award five times in a row (1994–98), while Michelle Akers (1990 and 1991), Tiffeny Milbrett (2000 and 2001), Abby Wambach (2003 and 2004; 2010 and 2011) and Kristine Lilly (2005 and 2006) are the only players to have won the award in consecutive seasons.

Players that are still active in Europe are highlighted in boldface.

Multiple Male U.S. Soccer Player of the Year
Player	Wins	Seasons
Landon Donovan	4	2003, 2004, 2009, 2010
**Christian Pulisic**	4	2017, 2019, 2021, 2023
Kasey Keller	3	1997, 1999, 2005
Clint Dempsey	3	2007, 2011, 2012
Marcelo Balboa	2	1992, 1994
Tim Howard	2	2008, 2014
Jozy Altidore	2	2013, 2016

Multiple Female U.S. Soccer Player of the Year
Player	Wins	Seasons
Abby Wambach	6	2003, 2004, 2007, 2010, 2011, 2013
Mia Hamm	5	1994, 1995, 1996, 1997, 1998
Michelle Akers	3	1990, 1991, 1999
Kristine Lilly	3	1993, 2005, 2006
April Heinrichs	2	1986, 1989
Carin Jennings-Gabarra	2	1987, 1992
Tiffeny Milbrett	2	2000, 2001
Carli Lloyd	2	2008, 2015
Alex Morgan	2	2012, 2018
Julie Ertz	2	2017, 2019

== See also ==
- List of sports awards honoring women
- Athlete of the Year
- Fútbol de Primera Player of the Year
