= Belarus at the Deaflympics =

- IPC code: BLR
- NPC: Belarusian Sports Federation of the Deaf
- Medals: Gold 33 Silver 31 Bronze 23 Total 87

Summer appearances
- 1993; 1997; 2001; 2005; 2009; 2013; 2017; 2021

Other related appearances
- Soviet Union (1957–1991)

Belarus participated at the Deaflympics from 1993 until it was banned in 2022, and won 87 medals. After the 2022 Russian invasion of Ukraine, the International Committee of Sports for the Deaf (ICSD) banned athletes from Belarus from that year's Deaflympics in Caxias do Sul, Brazil.

Belarus has yet to compete at the Winter Deaflympic Games.

== Medal tallies ==
| Event | Gold | Silver | Bronze | Total |
| 1993 | 5 | 2 | 3 | 10 |
| 1997 | 2 | 2 | 1 | 5 |
| 2001 | 0 | 2 | 2 | 4 |
| 2005 | 4 | 8 | 7 | 19 |
| 2009 | 10 | 6 | 7 | 23 |
| 2013 | 12 | 11 | 3 | 26 |
| 2017 | 4 | 9 | 3 | 16 |

== See also ==
- Belarus at the Paralympics
- Belarus at the Olympics
