= INAS World Football Championships =

International Intellectual disability football

The Virtus World Football Championships (formerly INAS World Football Championship) is an international Intellectual disability football (variation of association football) competition for athletes with intellectual disabilities.

== History ==
It takes place every four years, typically in the country that also hosts the FIFA World Cup. It is organized by the International Sports Federation for Persons with Intellectual Disability (INAS-FID) which also organizes championships in other sports.

To participate in an INAS-FID event, an athlete must have an intellectual disability that was evident before the age of 18, significant limitations in adaptive behavior, and an IQ score below 75. The latter requirement led to controversy in 2006, when third-placed Germany was disqualified because the employed IQ tests did not accord with international standards.

== Results ==
Host	Year	Final			Venue	Bronze match		
Host	Year	Winner	Score	Runner-up	Venue	Third place	Score	Fourth place
Netherlands	1994							
England	1998	Poland						
Japan	2002	England	2 – 1	Netherlands	International Stadium Yokohama, Yokohama			
Germany	2006	Saudi Arabia	4 – 4 (a.e.t.) (9 – 8 pens.)	Netherlands	BayArena, Leverkusen			
South Africa	2010	Saudi Arabia	1 – 0	Netherlands	Peter Mokaba Stadium, Polokwane	Poland		Portugal
Brazil	2014	Saudi Arabia	4 – 2	South Africa	Arena Corinthians, São Paulo	Poland	2-0	Japan
Sweden	2018	Saudi Arabia	2 – 0	Argentina	Tingvalla IP, Karlstad			
France	2022	Cancelled due to insufficient teams participating						

== See also ==
- Intellectually Disabled Futsal at the 2005 Islamic Solidarity Games
