= EuroDeaf 2015 =

Football Competition

EuroDeaf 2015 2015 European Deaf Football Championships
Tournament details
- Host country: Germany
- City: Hanover
- Dates: 14-27 June
- Teams: 16 men's and 4 women's (from IEuropean Deaf Sport Organization (EDSO) confederations)

Final positions
- Champions: M: Turkey (1st title); W: Russia (2nd title)
- Runners-up: M: Russia; W: Germany
- Third place: M: United Kingdom; W: Poland

The EuroDeaf 2015, short for the 2015 European Deaf Football Championships, is the eighth edition of the European competition of deaf football national teams for men, and the second edition for women. It was organized by the European Deaf Sport Organization (EDSO), and was held in Hanover, Germany between 14 and 27 June 2015. 16 men's national teams and 4 women's national teams competed first in the group stage and subsequently in knock-out stage. In the men's championship, Turkey won the title for the first time, defeating Russia in the final, Great Britain placed third. In the women's championship, Russia won the title for the second time, defeating Germany in the final, Poland placed third.

== Participating nations ==
Men

- Belgium
- Croatia
- Czech Republic
- Denmark
- France
- Germany
- United Kingdom
- Greece
- Hungary
- Ireland
- Italy
- Poland
- Russia
- Sweden
- Turkey
- Ukraine

Women

- Germany
- United Kingdom
- Poland
- Russia
