= Danielle Joyce =

Scottish swimmer

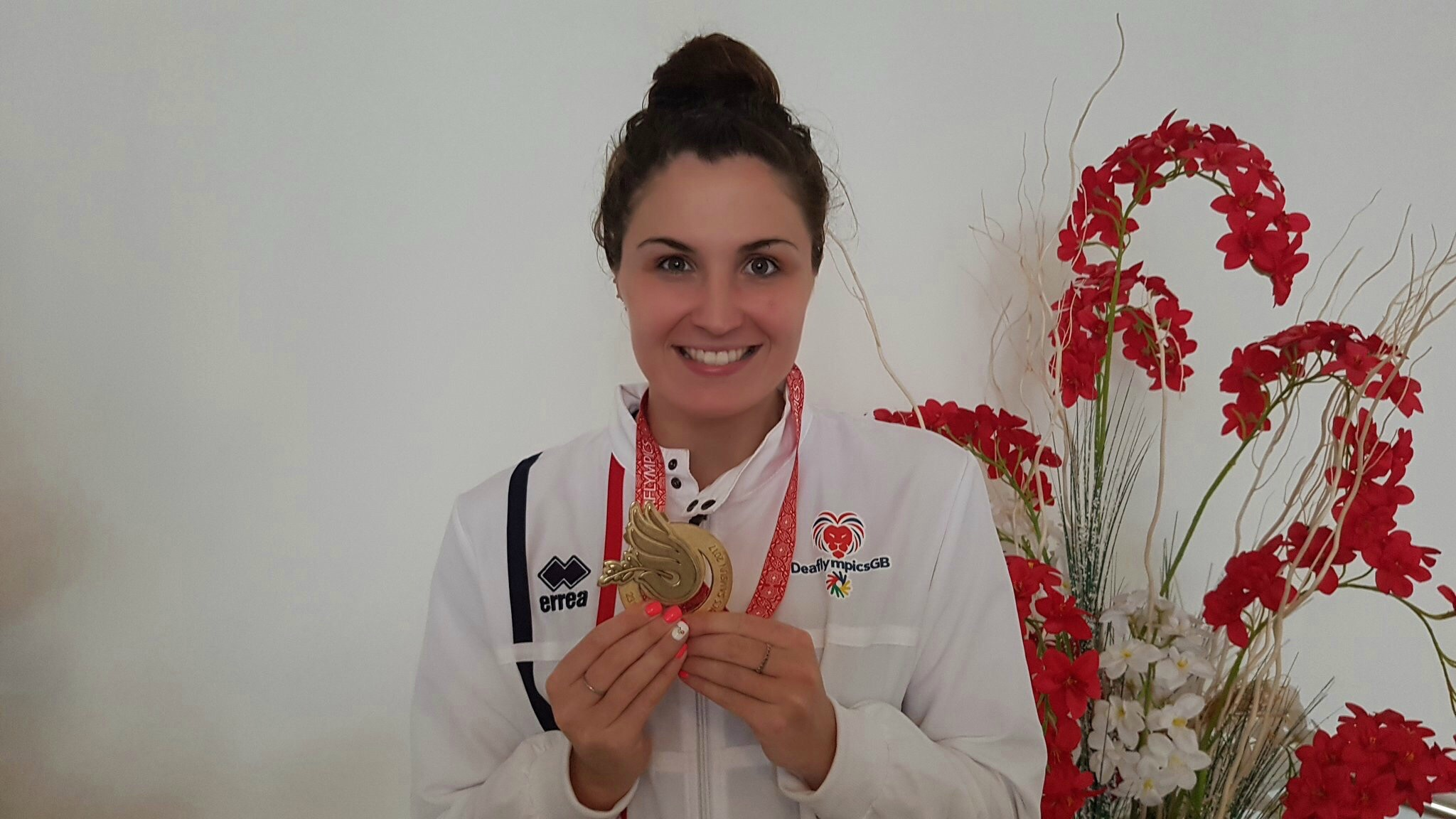
- Danii with her first gold of the games

Personal information
- Born: 14 June 1996 (age 30) Stevenston, Scotland

Sport
- Sport: Swimming
Medal record
Representing Great Britain
Deaflympics
Gold medal – first place	2017 Samsun	50m freestyle
Gold medal – first place	2017 Samsun	100m freestyle
Bronze medal – third place	2017 Samsun	50m backstroke

Danielle Joyce (born 14 June 1996) is a Scottish swimmer, who swims freestyle and backstroke in the S15 hearing impaired category. In 2017, she became a double gold medallist at the 23rd Deaflympics in Samsun, Turkey. She was born with moderate hearing loss which deteriorated rapidly from about the age of 12. She is now profoundly deaf in one ear and severely deaf in the other.

== Early life ==
Joyce was born on 14 June 1996 and grew up in Stevenston, North Ayrshire. While she was still a toddler she took up swimming at the North Ayrshire Swimming Club but experienced numerous physical problems. In September 2011 Joyce broke a bone in her foot and gave up swimming altogether. However, a number of years later at a disability sports day she was encouraged to consider deaf swimming.

She was Head Girl at Auchenharvie Academy before studying BSc Sport and Exercise at the University of Stirling.

== List of records and awards ==
- Double Gold medalist 50 & 100 Freestyle at 2017 Deaflympics, Samsun Turkey
- Scottish Disability Sports & Scottish Swimming Disability swimmer of the year 2017
- Scottish Women in Sport Sportswoman of the Year 2015 (mainstream award)
- Current holder of 8 deaf world records
- Broken Deaf world records 28 times in last 3 years
- Youth Deaf sports personality 2014
- 3rd in World Deaf Sports Woman of the Year 2015
- Runner Up Deaf Sports Personality of the Year 2015/2016
- World Deaf Backstroke Champion Texas 2015
- 7 Deaflympics finals 2013
- 9 Gold medals at 2016 GB Deaf Swimming Championships
- UK Deaf Sports Ambassador
- NDCS Scotland's first Sports Ambassador
- Selected as part of the Scottish Disability Sports Youth Panel
- North Ayrshire Rising Star winner
- North Ayrshire Provosts Civic Pride Sports award winner 2015
- North Ayrshire Community Sports Personality of the year 2016
- Commonwealth baton bearer 2014

She is currently coached by Bradley Hay.
