= EuroDeaf 2019 =

Football Competition

EuroDeaf 2019 2019 European Deaf Football Championships
Tournament details
- Host country: Greece
- City: Heraklion
- Dates: 2–15 June
- Teams: 16 men's (from IEuropean Deaf Sport Organization (EDSO) confederations)
- Venue(s): Archanes Stadium, Irodotos Stadium, Pankritio Stadium, Theodoros Vardinogiannis Stadium

Final positions
- Champions: Ukraine (1st title)
- Runners-up: Germany
- Third place: Greece
- Fourth place: Ireland

Tournament statistics
- Top scorer: (Turkey) Fırat Kaya (9 goals)
- Best player: (Italy) Stefano Cappato
- Best goalkeeper: (Ukraine) Dmytro Ukrainets
- Fair play award: Russia

The EuroDeaf 2019, short for the 2019 European Deaf Football Championships, is the ninth edition of the European competition of deaf football national teams for men. It was organized by the European Deaf Sport Organization (EDSO), and was held in Heraklion, Greece between 2 and 15 June 2019. 16 men's national teams competed first in the group stage and subsequently in knock-out stage. Ukraine won the title for the first time, defeating Germany in the final, Greece placed third before Ireland.

== Venues ==
Four stadiums, Archanes Stadium, Irodotos Stadium, Pankritio Stadium and Theodoros Vardinogiannis Stadium, hosted the games.

== Participating nations ==
- Belgium
- Croatia
- Denmark
- England
- France
- Germany
- Greece
- Hungary
- Ireland
- Italy
- Poland
- Russia
- Spain
- Sweden
- Turkey
- Ukraine

== Group stage ==
=== Pool A ===
Pos	Team	Pld	W	D	L	GF	GA	GD	Pts	Qualification
1	Italy	3	3	0	0	5	2	3	9	Quarterfinals
2	Greece (H)	3	2	0	1	5	3	2	6	Quarterfinals
3	Belgium	3	1	0	2	8	9	(-1)	3	
4	Spain	3	0	0	3	4	8	(-4)	0	

=== Pool B ===
Pos	Team	Pld	W	D	L	GF	GA	GD	Pts	Qualification
1	Turkey	3	3	0	0	20	1	19	9	Quarterfinals
2	Republic of Ireland	3	2	0	1	7	6	1	6	Quarterfinals
3	Denmark	3	1	0	2	2	9	(-7)	3	
4	Hungary	3	0	0	3	0	13	(-13)	0	

=== Pool C ===
Pos	Team	Pld	W	D	L	GF	GA	GD	Pts	Qualification
1	Germany	3	3	0	0	9	2	7	9	Quarterfinals
2	Russia	3	2	0	1	9	6	3	6	Quarterfinals
3	Croatia	3	1	10	2	3	6	(-3)	3	
4	Poland	3	0	0	3	5	12	(-7)	0	

=== Pool D ===
Pos	Team	Pld	W	D	L	GF	GA	GD	Pts	Qualification
1	Ukraine	3	3	0	0	7	1	6	9	Quarterfinals
2	England	3	2	0	1	4	3	1	6	Quarterfinals
3	France	3	1	0	2	1	3	(-2)	3	
4	Sweden	3	0	0	3	0	5	(-5)	0	

== Knockout stage ==
=== Elimination ===
Quarterfinals
10 Jıne
Italy	5
Republic of Ireland	7
10 Jıne
Ukraine	2
Russia	1
10 Jıne
Turkey	2
Greece	4
10 Jıne
Germany	4
England	3

Semifinals
12 June
Republic of Ireland	0
Ukraine	1
12 June
Greece	0
Germany	1

Gold medal
15 June
Ukraine	2
Germany	0
Bronze medal
14 June
Republic of Ireland	1
Greece	3

=== Classification ===
5th–8th place semi-finals
12 June
Italy	0
Russia	1
12 June
Turkey	2
England	0

5th place match
14 June
Russia	1
Turkey	2
7th place match
14 June
Italy	2
England	4

== Rankings ==
Rank	Team
1	Ukraine
2	Germany
3	Greece
4	Ireland
5	Turkey
6	Russia
7	England
8	Italy

== Awards ==
Top goalscorer:	(Turkey) Fırat Kaya (9 goals)
Best player:	(Italy) Stefano Cappato
Best goalkeeper:	(Ukraine) Dmytro Ukrainets
Fair play:	Russia
