= Auchenharvie Academy =

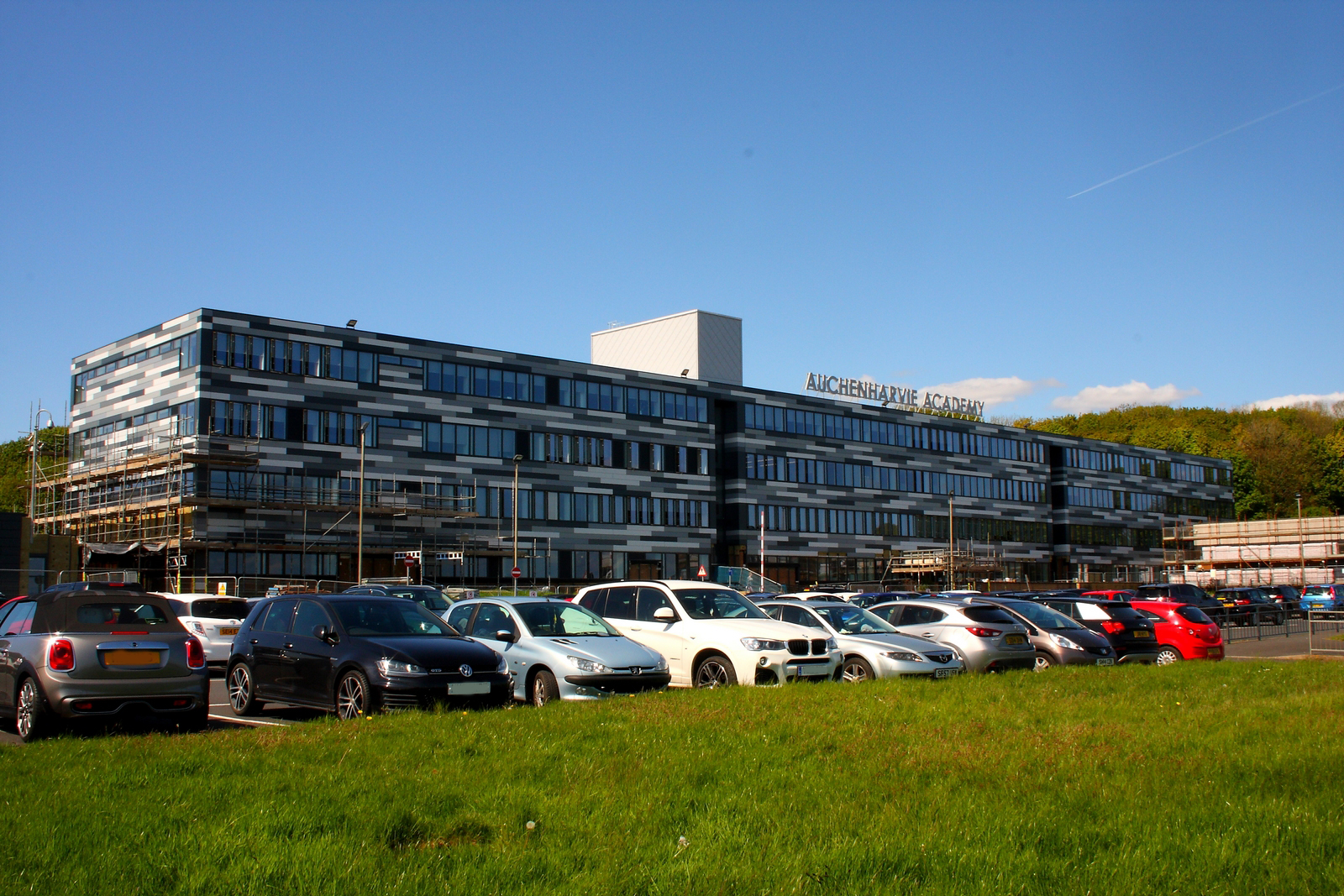

Location
- Stevenston, North Ayrshire; Scotland

Information
- Type: Secondary
- Motto: Learn Young, Learn Fair
- Established: 1971; 55 years ago
- Head teacher: Calum Johnston
- Enrollment: 638
- Colors: Blue, Red, White
- Website: www.auchenharvieacademy.com

Auchenharvie Academy is a secondary school located in Stevenston, North Ayrshire, Scotland. It is a comprehensive school which takes children from ages 11–18, and through years S1 - S6.

== History ==
The school was inaugurated with its first intake on 26 August 1971 after the closure of Stevenston Higher Grade, which had served the town as the main source of primary and secondary education for many years. The School was officially opened on 8 November 1971.

== School Refurbishment ==
Auchenharvie Academy was granted £5 million by North Ayrshire Council to carry out needed refurbishment. The repair work includes new external cladding on the main building and the Technical and P.E./Music Departments. The NAC toy library located in the school closed to allow a new P.E. department to be built.

There was much controversy over the new external cladding, as the grant only allowed the cladding to go less than a quarter of the way around the back of building. In September 2018, the North Ayrshire Council granted an extra £800,000 to allow cladding to cover the entire building.

== Notable former pupils ==
- Danielle Joyce, Deaflympic swimmer and former Head Girl.
