= England national learning disabilities football team =

Football squad for intellectually disabled adults

The England Learning Disabilities (LD) team is one of eight disability squads supported by the Football Association. To qualify for the team, players must have an intellectual disability with an IQ equal to or below 70–75, as determined by the World Health Organization. The players must also have been in receipt of special education, employment and/or respite care between the ages of 0 and 18.

The England LD team won the Learning Disabilities World Cup at the INAS World Football Championships in 2002, beating the Netherlands 2–1 at the Yokohama Stadium, Japan, in August 2002. They reached the final of the Learning Disabilities European Championships in August 2003, when they were beaten 2–1 by the Netherlands in Portugal. They were crowned world champions at the first Global Games in August 2004, beating Poland 4–1 in the final in Bollnäs, Sweden. The World Cup holders however crashed out of the quarter finals of the INAS FID World Football Championship in 2006, losing 4–1 to Saudi Arabia in Recklinghausen, Germany.
