= Felicia Schroeder =

American soccer player (born 1986)

Personal information
- Birth name: Felicia Marie Schroeder
- Date of birth: December 3, 1986 (age 39)
- Place of birth: Cincinnati, Ohio, U.S.
- Height: 1.70 m (5 ft 7 in)
- Position: Forward

Youth career
- Ohio Elite Soccer Academy
- Cardinals
- –2005: Oak Hills Highlanders

College career
Years	Team	Apps	(Gls)
2005–2006	South Carolina Gamecocks	37	(8)
2007–2008	Purdue Boilermakers	47	(13)

Senior career*
Years	Team	Apps	(Gls)
2011	Åland United	27	(23)
2012	Kvarnsvedens IK	11	(7)

International career
2009–2013	U.S. Deaf National Team	14	(19)
- * Club domestic league appearances and goals

Felicia Waldock (née Schroeder; born December 3, 1986) is an American retired soccer player who played for Åland United. Born deaf, she also received gold medals at the 2009 and 2013 Deaflympics with the United States women's deaf national team.

== Early life and education ==
Felicia Schroeder was born in Cincinnati on December 3, 1986, to Tom and Andrea Schroeder; she also has a sister. Schroeder was born deaf. Due to a lack of appropriate accommodations, she attended nine different schools by the time she was in third grade.

While in school, Schroeder played soccer with the Ohio Elite Soccer Academy and the Cardinals. Between the two clubs, she won four state championships (1999, 2000, 2001, 2005), as well as a national championship. As of July 2023, she continues to hold records at her high school for number of goals and assists.

She graduated from Oak Hills High School in 2005 before attending the University of South Carolina, where she was the only deaf student on campus; because of this, the school did not have a sign-language interpreter and hired someone from Georgia to attend Schroeder's classes with her. Due to difficulties with appropriate accommodations, she transferred to Purdue University, where she studied psychology "to become a psychologist and help deaf children [...] realize that it is a hearing world, but they can still accomplish so much".

== Career ==
=== Athletic career ===
Schroeder played soccer at the University of South Carolina for two years before transferring to Purdue University. In 2007, while at Purdue, the team won a Big Ten Conference tournament.

In 2009, she represented the United States as a member of the US Deaf National Team and was selected to play at the 2009 Deaflympics in Taipei. Upon learning she had secured the position, Schroeder learned that "because the U.S. Olympic Committee does not sponsor the games, each player had to raise $5,000 for the trip to Taiwan". Schroeder was able to secure the funding and ultimately received a gold medal.

In 2011, Schroeder made her debut playing for "Åland United of Naisten Liiga, the highest division of soccer in Finland." She played for a Swedish team in 2012. The same year, she received a gold medal at the Deaf World Cup, where she played for the US national women's team, as well as the inaugural award for Player of the Year with a Disability.

In 2013, she received another gold medal at the Deaflympics.

=== Coaching ===
In 2012, Schroeder took on the role of assistant coach for the women's soccer team at Texas A&M International University, where she helped the team increase their national ranking. She also coached at the University of Cincinnati, Benton Central High School, and the Ohio Elite Soccer Academy.

=== Teaching ===
As of 2019, Waldock taught American Sign Language at Colerain High School and was the coach for the school's girls' soccer team. Waldock now teaches ASL 1 and 2 at Lakota West High school and is the Head JV coach for wemons soccer

== Personal life ==
Schroeder married Adam Waldock in 2014. As of 2019, they lived in Liberty Township, Ohio, and have two children.
