= South African Deaf Sports Federation =

Sports governing body in South Africa

- Jurisdiction: South Africa
- Abbreviation: SADSF
- Founded: 1981
- Affiliation: CISS
- Headquarters: Parow, Cape Town, South Africa
- President: Julius Maxajwe
- Secretary: Leonard Miya

Official website
- www.sadeafsport.com
- (South Africa)

South African Deaf Sports Federation (SADSF) is the official governing body of Deaf Sports in South Africa responsible for sending, supporting, funding the teams representing South Africa and the deaf sportspeople at the Deaflympics, Deaf World Championships. The organisation took the responsibility for sending deaf sportspeople at the Deaflympics since 1993.

The SADSF was established in 1981 and it is affiliated with the Comite International des Sports des Sourds (CISS), which is the world governing body of Deaf sports.

The South African Deaf Sports Federation is also affiliated with the South African Sports Confederation and Olympic Committee (SASCOC), which is the national governing body in South Africa responsible for Olympics and Paralympics.

The South African Sports Confederation and Olympic Committee raised adequate funds by convincing the South African Deaf Sports Federation when it faced financial problems to send the Deaf athletes for the 2013 Summer Deaflympics held in Sofia, Bulgaria.

== See also ==
- Sport in South Africa
