= EuroDeaf =

European deaf football championships

The EuroDeaf, short for European Deaf Football Championships, is a quadrennial European competitions in the association football sport for deaf people. It is organised by the European Deaf Sport Organization (EDSO). It was first held for men's teams in 1987, and for women's in 2011. The first women's championship was held in a different host country and at a different date the same year. In 2015 both championships were held in the same host country and at the same time. In 2019 women's championship was not held. Since 1 October 2021 women's football rating was cancelled and women continued to play only futsal matches.

== Men ==
Results

Edition	Year	Host	Dates	Nations played	Gold	Silver	Bronze	4th place	Ref.
1	1987	Italy, Viareggio	19–28 Jun	8	ITA	ESP	GER	NED	
2	1991	Belgium , Ghent	2–8 Jun	16	URS	BEL	IRE	FRA	
3	1995	Germany, Berlin	25 May – 4 Jun	16	ITA	IRE	GER	GRE	
4	1999	Norway, Oslo	15–25 Jun	12	ITA	FRA	ESP	UKR	
5	2003	Spain, Torremolinos	15–28 Jun	10	GER	ITA	FRA	IRE	
6	2007	Portugal, Lisbon	10–23 Jun	11	FRA	GBR	IRE	GER	
7	2011	Denmark, Aalborg	26 Jun – 9 Jul	12	RUS	UKR	GER	GBR	
8	2015	Germany, Hanover	14–27 Jun	16	TUR	RUS	GBR	UKR	
9	2019	Greece, Heraklion	2–15 Jun	16	UKR	GER	GRE	IRE	
10	2024	Turkey, Antalya	20 May – 1 Jun	13	FRA	UKR	TUR	ITA	

=== Medals summary ===
Rank	Nation	Gold	Silver	Bronze	Total
1	Italy	3	1	0	4
2	France	2	1	1	4
3	Ukraine	1	2	0	3
4	Germany	1	1	3	5
5	Russia	1	1	0	2
6	Turkey	1	0	1	2
7	Soviet Union	1	0	0	1
8	Ireland	0	1	2	3
9	Spain	0	1	1	2
9	United Kingdom	0	1	1	2
11	Belgium	0	1	0	1
12	Greece	0	0	1	1
Totals (12 entries)		10	10	10	30

== Women ==
Results

Edition	Year	Host	Dates	Nations played	Gold	Silver	Bronze	4th place	Ref.
1	2011	Bulgaria, Albena	6–11 Jun	3	RUS	GER	GBR		
2	2015	Germany, Hanover	18–27 Jun	4	RUS	GER	POL	GBR	

=== Medals summary ===
Rank	Nation	Gold	Silver	Bronze	Total
1	Russia	2	0	0	2
2	Germany	0	2	0	2
3	Poland	0	0	1	1
3	United Kingdom	0	0	1	1
Totals (4 entries)		2	2	2	6

== U21 Football ==
Since 2016.

== Futsal ==
1st Sofia Bulgaria 10 - 16 November 2002

2nd Moscow Russia 10 - 18 November 2006

3rd Winterthur Switzerland 06 - 14 November 2010

4th Sofia Bulgaria 19 - 29 November 2014

5th Tampere Finland 6 - 14 December 2018

6th Montesilvano Italy 13 - 22 October 2022

7th Porec Croatia October 2026

=== Men ===
No. Year Championship GOLD SILVER BRONZE

1st 2002 Sofia (BUL) Croatia Slovakia Spain

2nd 2006 Moscow (RUS) Russia Spain Ukraine

3rd 2010 Winterthur (SUI) Ukraine Russia Netherlands

4th 2014 Sofia (BUL) Ukraine Russia Netherlands

5th 2018 Tampere (FIN) Spain Russia Italy

6th 2022 Spain - Italy - Sweden

=== Women ===
No. Year Championship GOLD SILVER BRONZE

1st 2002 Sofia (BUL) Germany Portugal Denmark

2nd 2006 Moscow (RUS) Russia England Germany

3rd 2010 Winterthur (SUI) Russia Denmark Germany

4th 2014 Sofia (BUL) Russia Germany England

5th 2018 Tampere (FIN) Poland Germany Spain

6th 2022 England - Spain - Poland

== Medals (Futsal) ==
Rank	Nation	Gold	Silver	Bronze	Total
1	Russia (RUS)	4	3	0	7
2	Spain (ESP)	2	2	2	6
3	Ukraine (UKR)	2	0	1	3
4	Germany (GER)	1	2	2	5
5	England (ENG)	1	1	1	3
6	Poland (POL)	1	0	1	2
7	Croatia (CRO)	1	0	0	1
8	Denmark (DEN)	0	1	1	2
8	Italy (ITA)	0	1	1	2
10	Portugal (POR)	0	1	0	1
10	Slovakia (SVK)	0	1	0	1
12	Netherlands (NED)	0	0	2	2
13	Sweden (SWE)	0	0	1	1
Totals (13 entries)		12	12	12	36

== See also ==
- World Deaf Football Championships
