= Intellectual disability football =

Parasports type

Intellectual disability football is a form of association football adapted for athletes with intellectual disability. It is part of the wider parasports and para football movement, providing competitive opportunities at national and international levels.

== Overview ==
The sport follows the general rules of association football, with adaptations related to eligibility, classification, and competition structure. Players must meet specific criteria for intellectual impairment as defined by governing bodies.

International competitions are primarily organized under the supervision of Virtus (World Intellectual Impairment Sport), which oversees classification and global tournaments.

== Competitions ==
The Virtus World Football Championships (formerly INAS World Football Championship) is an international association football competition for athletes with intellectual disabilities.

Major competitions in intellectual disability football include international championships organized by Virtus, as well as regional events and multi-sport competitions for athletes with disabilities.

== See also ==
- Para football
- Disability sport
