= South Africa at the Deaflympics =

- IPC code: RSA
- NPC: South African Deaf Sports Federation
- Website: www.sadeafsport.com
- Medals: Gold 35 Silver 18 Bronze 9 Total 62

Summer appearances
- 1993; 1997; 2001; 2005; 2009; 2013; 2017; 2021

South Africa has been participating at the Deaflympics from 1993 and have bagged 62 medals at the Summer Deaflympics South Africa has never participated in Winter Deaflympics.

== Medal tallies ==
=== Summer Deaflympics ===
Event	Gold	Silver	Bronze	Total
1993	1	3	0	4
1997	5	2	2	9
2001	8	2	3	13
2005	13	5	1	19
2009	8	2	2	12
2013	0	2	1	3
2017	0	2	0	2

== Notable athletes ==
- Swimmer Terence Parkin's tally of 33 medals is the most at Deaflympics for any individual athlete. He also broke seven Deaflympics records during his career.

== See also ==
- South Africa at the Olympics
- South Africa at the Paralympics
