= Football at the 2025 Summer Deaflympics =

- Venue: J-Village Stadium, Japan
- Dates: 14–25 November 2025

Football at the 2025 Summer Deaflympics was held from 14 to 25 November 2025 at J-Village Stadium in Fukushima, Japan.

Two medal events were held, consists of both men and women events.

== Medal table ==
* Host nation (Japan)

Rank	NOC	Gold	Silver	Bronze	Total
1	Turkey	1	0	0	1
1	United States	1	0	0	1
3	Japan*	0	2	0	2
4	France	0	0	1	1
4	Great Britain	0	0	1	1
Totals (5 entries)		2	2	2	6

== Medalists ==
Event	Gold	Silver	Bronze
Men's	Turkey	Japan	France
Women's	United States	Japan	Great Britain

== ِDraw ==
After first official draw, 15 teams was in men's table but a few days of games, 2 teams withdraw and draw was changed.

== Men's tournament ==
=== Group A ===
Pos	Team	Pld	W	D	L	GF	GA	GD	Pts	Qualification
1	Japan	3	2	1	0	15	0	+15	7	Quarterfinals
2	Italy	3	1	2	0	7	2	+5	5	Quarterfinals
3	Australia	3	0	2	1	3	11	–8	2	
4	Mexico	3	0	1	2	1	13	–12	1	

14 November
12:00

Japan	8–0	Australia

J-Village Stadium, Fukushima

14 November
12:00

Italy	5–0	Mexico

J-Village Stadium, Fukushima

16 November
16:30

Japan	7–0	Mexico

J-Village Stadium, Fukushima

16 November
16:30

Australia	2–2	Italy

J-Village Stadium, Fukushima

18 November
16:30

Japan	0–0	Italy

J-Village Stadium, Fukushima

18 November
16:30

Mexico	1–1	Australia

J-Village Stadium, Fukushima

=== Group B ===
Pos	Team	Pld	W	D	L	GF	GA	GD	Pts	Qualification
1	Turkey	2	1	1	0	3	2	+1	4	Quarterfinals
2	Great Britain	2	0	2	0	1	1	0	2	Quarterfinals
3	Iran	2	0	1	1	1	2	–1	1	—

14 November
12:00

Turkey	2–1	Iran

J-Village Stadium, Fukushima

16 November
12:00

Turkey	1–1	Great Britain

J-Village Stadium, Fukushima

18 November
12:00

Great Britain	0–0	Iran

J-Village Stadium, Fukushima

=== Group C ===
Pos	Team	Pld	W	D	L	GF	GA	GD	Pts	Qualification
1	Brazil	2	1	1	0	8	3	+5	4	Quarterfinals
2	France	2	1	1	0	6	2	+4	4	Quarterfinals
3	Uzbekistan	2	0	0	2	1	10	–9	0	—

14 November
16:00

France	4–0	Uzbekistan

J-Village Stadium, Fukushima

16 November
12:00

Brazil	2–2	France

J-Village Stadium, Fukushima

18 November
12:00

Uzbekistan	1–6	Brazil

J-Village Stadium, Fukushima

=== Group D ===
Pos	Team	Pld	W	D	L	GF	GA	GD	Pts	Qualification
1	Ukraine	2	2	0	0	12	2	+10	6	Quarterfinals
2	United States	2	1	0	1	5	7	–2	3	Quarterfinals
3	South Korea	2	0	0	2	3	11	–8	0	—

14 November
16:30

Ukraine	5–1	United States

J-Village Stadium, Fukushima

16 November
16:30

United States	4–2	South Korea

J-Village Stadium, Fukushima

18 November
16:30

Ukraine	7–1	South Korea

J-Village Stadium, Fukushima

=== Elimination ===
Quarterfinals
20 Nov
Japan	2
Great Britain	1
20 Nov
Brazil	1
United States	2
20 Nov
Turkey	3
Italy	1
20 Nov
Ukraine	0
France	2

Semifinals
22 Nov
Japan	1
United States	0
22 Nov
Turkey	2
France	0

Gold medal
25 Nov
Japan	1
Turkey	2
Bronze medal
24 Nov
United States	0
France	1

==== 5th–8th placement ====
5th–8th place semi-finals
22 Nov
Great Britain	3
Brazil	1
22 Nov
Ukraine	3
Italy	0

5th place match
24 Nov
Great Britain	1
Ukraine	2
7th place match
24 Nov
Italy	4
Brazil	0

== Women's tournament ==
=== Group stage ===
Pos	Team	Pld	W	D	L	GF	GA	GD	Pts	Qualification
1	United States	4	4	0	0	34	0	+34	12	Final
2	Japan	4	3	0	1	12	6	+6	9	Final
3	Great Britain	4	2	0	2	4	20	–16	6	3rd place match
4	Australia	4	1	0	3	4	16	–12	3	3rd place match
5	Kenya	4	0	0	4	0	12	–12	0	—

15 November
12:00

Japan	0–5	United States

J-Village Stadium, Fukushima

15 November
12:00

Great Britain	1–0	Australia

J-Village Stadium, Fukushima

17 November
12:00

United States	3–0	Kenya

J-Village Stadium, Fukushima

17 November
12:00

Japan	6–0	Great Britain

J-Village Stadium, Fukushima

19 November
12:00

Japan	3–0	Kenya

J-Village Stadium, Fukushima

19 November
12:00

United States	12–0	Australia

J-Village Stadium, Fukushima

21 November
12:00

Japan	3–1	Australia

J-Village Stadium, Fukushima

21 November
12:00

Great Britain	3–0	Kenya

J-Village Stadium, Fukushima

23 November
12:00

Australia	3–0	Kenya

J-Village Stadium, Fukushima

23 November
12:00

United States	14–0	Great Britain

J-Village Stadium, Fukushima

=== Final ===
Match	Score	Date
United States vs Japan	4–0	25 Nov 12:00

=== Third place match ===
Match	Score	Date
Great Britain vs Australia	2–0	25 Nov 10:00
