= 2016 World Deaf Football Championships =

Tournament details
- Host country: Italy
- City: Agropoli, Capaccio, Salerno
- Dates: 19 June-2 July
- Teams: 16 men's and 6 women's (from International Committee of Sports for the Deaf (CISS) confederations)

Final positions
- Champions: M: Turkey (2nd title); W: United States (2nd title)
- Runners-up: M: Germany; W: Russia
- Third place: M: Russia; W: United Kingdom
- Fourth place: M: Argentina; W: Poland

The 2016 World Deaf Football Championships were the third edition of the international competition of deaf football national men's and women's teams. They were organized by the International Committee of Sports for the Deaf (CISS), and were held in Agropoli, Capaccio and Salerno in Italy between 19 June and 2 July 2016. In the men's championship, Turkey won the title for the second time, defeating Germany in the final, Russia became bronze medalist before Argentina. In the women's championship, the United States won the title for the second time, defeating Russia in the final, Great Britain became bronze medalist before Poland.

== Rankings ==
=== Men ===
Rank	Team
1	Turkey
2	Germany
3	Russia
4	Argentina
5	Egypt
6	United States
7	United Kingdom
8	Belgium
9	Ukraine
10	Italy
11	Japan
12	South Korea
13	Greece
14	Iran
15	Sweden
16	Iraq

2016 World Deaf Football Championships - Men

Turkey
Second title

=== Women ===
Rank	Team
1	United States
2	Russia
3	United Kingdom
4	Poland
5	Italy
6	Turkey

2016 World Deaf Football Championships - Women

United States
Second title
