= 2012 World Deaf Football Championships =

Tournament details
- Host country: Turkey
- City: Ankara
- Dates: 16–28 July
- Teams: 15 men's and 5 women's (from International Committee of Sports for the Deaf (CISS) confederations)

Final positions
- Champions: M: Turkey (1st title); W: United States (1st title)
- Runners-up: M: Egypt; W: Russia
- Third place: M: Ukraine; W: Germany
- Fourth place: M: Russia; W: Poland

The 2012 World Deaf Football Championships were the second edition of the international competition of deaf football national men's and women's teams. They were organized by the International Committee of Sports for the Deaf (CISS), and were held in Ankara, Turkey between 16 and 28 July 2012. In the men's championship, Turkey won the title for the first time, defeating Egypt in the final, Ukraine became bronze medalist before Russia. In the women's championship, the United States won the title for the first time, defeating Russia in the final, Germany became bronze medalist before Poland.

== Rankings ==
=== Men ===
Rank	Team
1	Turkey
2	Egypt
3	Ukraine
4	Russia
5-8	Japan
5-8	Germany
5-8	Thailand
5-8	France
9-12	Iran
9-12	United States
9-12	Uzbekistan
9-12	Greece
13-15	South Korea
13-15	Spain
13-15	Venezuela

2012 World Deaf Football Championships - Men

Turkey
First title

=== Women ===
Rank	Team
1	United States
2	Russia
3	Germany
4	Poland
5	Japan

2012 World Deaf Football Championships - Women

United States
First title
