= Football at the 2021 Summer Deaflympics =

Deaflympics event

- Venue: Stadium SER Caxias; Flores da Cunha
- Location: Brazil, Caxias do Sul and Flores da Cunha
- Dates: 30 April–15 May

Champions
- Men: Ukraine
- Women: United States

Football at the 2021 Summer Deaflympics were held in Caxias Do Sul, Brazil from 30 April to 15 May 2022.

== Medalists ==
Event	Gold	Silver	Bronze
Men	Ukraine (UKR)	France (FRA)	Turkey (TUR)
Women	United States (USA)	Poland (POL)	Brazil (BRA)

== Men's tournament ==
=== Group stage ===
==== Pool A ====
Matches

30 April 2022

- Egypt 1–1 France
- Ukraine 2–1 South Korea

2 May 2022

- Argentina 1–0 South Korea
- Egypt 0–5 Ukraine

4 May 2022

- France 2–3 Ukraine
- Argentina 2–3 Egypt

6 May 2022

- South Korea 0–9 Egypt
- France 1–0 Argentina

8 May 2022

- Ukraine 1–2 Argentina
- South Korea 0–10 France

Standings

Pos	Team	Pld	W	D	L	GF	GA	GD	Pts	Qualification
1	Ukraine	4	3	0	1	11	5	6	9	Quarterfinals
2	France	4	2	1	1	14	4	10	7	Quarterfinals
3	Egypt	4	2	1	1	13	8	5	7	
4	Argentina	4	2	0	2	5	5	0	6	
5	South Korea	4	0	0	4	1	22	–21	0	

==== Pool B ====
Matches

30 April 2022

- Brazil 2–3 Cameroon
- Italy 0–2 Iran

2 May 2022

- Netherlands 0–4 Iran
- Brazil 1–4 Italy

4 May 2022

- Cameroon 2–4 Italy
- Netherlands 0–1 Brazil

6 May 2022

- Iran 1–0 Brazil
- Cameroon 4–1 Netherlands

8 May 2022

- Italy 4–0 Netherlands
- Iran 6–0 Cameroon

Standings

Pos	Team	Pld	W	D	L	GF	GA	GD	Pts	Qualification
1	Iran	4	4	0	0	11	0	11	12	Quarterfinals
2	Italy	4	3	0	1	12	5	7	9	Quarterfinals
3	Brazil	4	2	0	2	5	5	0	6	
4	Cameroon	4	1	0	3	5	12	–7	3	
5	Netherlands	4	0	0	4	1	12	–11	0	

==== Pool C ====
Matches

30 April 2022

- United States 4–1 Iraq
- Turkey 2–0 Germany

2 May 2022

- Mali 0–5 Germany
- United States 0–1 Turkey

4 May 2022

- Iraq 0–5 Turkey
- Mali 0–2 United States

6 May 2022

- Germany 4–0 United States
- Iraq 4–3 Mali

8 May 2022

- Turkey 5–2 Mali
- Germany 2–1 Iraq

Standings

Pos	Team	Pld	W	D	L	GF	GA	GD	Pts	Qualification
1	Turkey	4	4	0	0	13	2	11	12	Quarterfinals
2	Germany	4	3	0	1	11	3	8	9	Quarterfinals
3	United States	4	2	0	2	6	6	0	6	
4	Iraq	4	1	0	3	6	14	–8	3	
5	Mali	4	0	0	4	5	16	–11	0	

==== Pool D ====
Matches

30 April 2022

- Greece 3–0 Mexico
- Uzbekistan 0–6 Poland

2 May 2022

- Senegal 2–2 Poland
- Greece 3–2 Uzbekistan

4 May 2022

- Mexico 1–4 Uzbekistan
- Senegal 4–1 Greece

6 May 2022

- Poland 4–0 Greece
- Mexico 0–3 Senegal

8 May 2022

- Uzbekistan 1–2 Senegal
- Poland 0–1 Mexico

Standings

Pos	Team	Pld	W	D	L	GF	GA	GD	Pts	Qualification
1	Senegal	4	3	1	0	11	4	7	10	Quarterfinals
2	Poland	4	2	1	1	12	3	9	7	Quarterfinals
3	Greece	4	2	0	2	7	10	–3	6	
4	Uzbekistan	4	1	0	3	7	12	–5	3	
5	Mexico	4	1	0	3	2	10	–8	3	

=== Knockout stage ===
==== Elimination ====
Quarterfinals
10 May 2022
Ukraine	2
Italy	1
10 May 2022
Turkey	9
Poland	0
10 May 2022
Iran	1
France	2
10 May 2022
Senegal	3
Germany	4

Semifinals
12 May 2022
Ukraine	2
Turkey	0
12 May 2022
France	3
Germany	2

Gold medal
15 May 2022
Ukraine	1
France	0
Bronze medal
14 May 2022
Turkey	1 (4)
Germany	1 (3)

==== Classification ====
5th–8th place semi-finals
12 May 2022
Italy	2
Poland	1
12 May 2022
Iran	0 (3)
Senegal	0 (5)

5th place match
14 May 2022
Italy	0 (0)
Senegal	0 (2)
7th place match
14 May 2022
Iran	2
Poland	1

== Women's tournament ==
=== Group stage ===
==== Pool A ====
Pos	Team	Pld	W	D	L	GF	GA	GD	Pts	Qualification
1	United States	4	4	0	0	20	0	20	12	Gold medal match
2	Poland	4	3	0	1	18	4	14	9	Gold medal match
3	Brazil (H)	4	2	0	2	8	7	1	6	Bronze medal match
4	Japan	4	1	0	3	14	6	8	3	Bronze medal match
5	Kenya	4	0	0	4	1	44	–43	0	

=== Final results ===
Gold medal match
15 May
United States	2 (4)
Poland	2 (2)

Bronze medal match
14 May
Brazil	3
Japan	0
