= Football at the 2013 Summer Deaflympics =

Football was contested in the 2013 Summer Deaflympics from July 26 to August 4. Riu Resort and Spa Pravets were selected to host the football matches. Russia defeated Ukraine to claim the gold medal. Germany placed third.

== Group stage ==
=== Pool A ===
Pos	Team	Pld	W	D	L	GF	GA	GD	Pts	Qualification
1	Germany	3	2	1	0	8	2	6	7	Quarterfinals
2	Turkey	3	2	1	0	6	0	6	7	Quarterfinals
3	Iraq	3	1	0	2	2	6	(-4)	3	
4	Argentina	3	0	0	3	2	10	(-8)	0	

=== Pool B ===
Pos	Team	Pld	W	D	L	GF	GA	GD	Pts	Qualification
1	Ukraine	3	2	1	0	10	3	7	7	Quarterfinals
2	Iran	3	1	2	0	9	5	4	5	Quarterfinals
3	South Korea	3	1	1	1	12	7	5	4	
4	Denmark	3	0	0	3	2	18	(-16)	0	

=== Pool C ===
Pos	Team	Pld	W	D	L	GF	GA	GD	Pts	Qualification
1	Russia	3	2	1	0	8	3	5	7	Quarterfinals
2	Republic of Ireland	3	2	1	0	6	3	3	7	Quarterfinals
3	Nigeria	3	0	1	2	5	9	(-4)	1	
4	Japan	3	0	1	2	5	9	(-4)	1	

=== Pool D ===
Pos	Team	Pld	W	D	L	GF	GA	GD	Pts	Qualification
1	Egypt	3	2	1	0	7	0	7	7	Quarterfinals
2	Greece	3	1	2	0	3	2	1	5	Quarterfinals
3	Venezuela	3	1	1	1	6	9	(-3)	4	
4	Saudi Arabia	3	0	0	3	3	8	(-5)	0	

== Knockout stage ==
=== 13th-16th places ===
13th–16th place semi-finals
31 July
Argentina	3
Denmark	2
31 July
Japan	11
Saudi Arabia	1

13th place match
2 August
Argentina	3
Japan	1
15th place match >
2 August
Denmark	3
Saudi Arabia	5

=== 9th-12th places ===
9th–12th place semi-finals
31 July
Iraq	2
South Korea	4
31 July
Nigeria	5
Venezuela	3

9th place match
2 August
South Korea	2
Nigeria	1
11th place match >
2 August
Iraq	3
Venezuela	0

=== Quarterfinals ===
Quarterfinals
31 July
Germany	6
Iran	5
31 July
Russia	3
Greece	0
31 July
Ukraine	6
Turkey	5
31 July
Egypt	4
Republic of Ireland	3

Semifinals
2 August
Germany	1
Russia	4
2 August
Ukraine	2
Egypt	0

Gold medal
4 August
Russia	2
Ukraine	1
Bronze medal
4 AUgust
Germany	2
Egypt	1

=== 5th-8th places ===
5th–8th place semi-finals
2 August
Iran	3
Greece	0
2 August
Turkey	0
Republic of Ireland	3

5th place match
3 August
Iran	2
Republic of Ireland	1
7th place match >
3 August
Greece	0
Turkey	2

== Rankings ==
Rank	Team
1	Russia
2	Ukraine
3	Germany
4	Egypt
5	Iran
6	Ireland
7	Turkey
8	Greece
9	South Korea
10	Nigeria
11	Iraq
12	Venezuela
13	Argentina
14	Japan
15	Saudi Arabia
16	Denmark
