= Deaf football =

Association football with deaf players

Deaf football is a form of para football played by athletes who are deaf or hard of hearing. It is governed internationally by the International Committee of Sports for the Deaf (ICSD), the organization responsible for the Deaflympics.

The sport follows the standard rules of football with some adaptations to accommodate hearing impairments, such as the use of visual signals (e.g. flags or lights) instead of whistles by referees.

== Competitions ==
The main international competition in deaf football is the football tournament at the Deaflympics, held every four years. In addition, continental and regional competitions are organized under ICSD and affiliated bodies.

World Deaf Football Championships is a world championships in deaf football.

EuroDeaf is a European championships in deaf football.

== Governance ==
Deaf football is overseen by the ICSD in cooperation with national deaf sports federations. The organization works to promote inclusion and provide competitive opportunities for deaf athletes worldwide.

== See also ==
- Para football
- Blind football
- Cerebral palsy football
- Disability sport
