= 2001 Summer Deaflympics =

19th Summer Deaflympics

19th Summer Deaflympics
- Host city: Rome, Italy
- Nations: 67 countries
- Athletes: 2,208 athletes
- Events: 134 in 14 sports
- Opening: 16 July 2001
- Closing: 1 August 2001
- Main venue: Stadio Olimpico

Summer

Winter

The 2001 Summer Deaflympics (Italian: Olimpiadi estive 2001 per non udenti), officially known as the 19th Summer Deaflympics (Italian: 19° Olimpiadi estive per sordi), is an international multi-sport event that was celebrated from 16 July to 1 August 2001, in Rome, Italy.

== Venues ==
- Stadio Olimpico – Athletics, Football
- Palazzetto dello Sport – Badminton, Basketball, Volleyball
- Riano – Basketball
- Albano – Basketball
- Baths of Caracalla – Cycling
- Stadio Flamino – Football
- Campo Acqua Acetosa – Football
- Lungotevere Acqua Acetosa – Bowling
- Campo Tre Fontane – Football
- Campo Maneggio – Handball
- Monte Livata – Orienteering
- Poligono "Umberto I°" – Shooting
- Piscina Coni – Swimming
- Palesta Tre Fontane – Table tennis
- Foro Italico – Tennis, Water polo
- Monterotondo – Volleyball
- Palafilpjk – Wrestling

== Medal tally ==
* Host nation (Italy)

2001 Summer Deaflympics medal table
Rank	NOC	Gold	Silver	Bronze	Total
1	United States (USA)	26	21	23	70
2	Germany (GER)	13	21	13	47
3	Russia (RUS)	13	18	18	49
4	Ukraine (UKR)	12	10	10	32
5	Japan (JPN)	10	5	5	20
6	Iran (IRI)	8	7	4	19
7	South Africa (RSA)	8	2	3	13
8	Italy (ITA)*	7	2	9	18
9	Canada (CAN)	4	5	5	14
10	Czech Republic (CZE)	4	5	2	11
11	South Korea (KOR)	4	4	4	12
12	France (FRA)	4	3	1	8
13	Australia (AUS)	4	1	1	6
14	Turkey (TUR)	3	0	3	6
15	India (IND)	3	0	0	3
16	China (CHN)	2	3	3	8
17	Yugoslavia (FRY)	2	2	0	4
18	Cuba (CUB)	2	1	6	9
19	Lithuania (LTU)	2	0	3	5
20	Sweden (SWE)	1	5	5	11
21	Netherlands (NED)	1	5	3	9
22	Malaysia (MAS)	1	3	0	4
23	Greece (GRE)	1	2	0	3
24	Chinese Taipei (TPE)	1	1	2	4
25	Croatia (CRO)	1	0	0	1
25	Denmark (DEN)	1	0	0	1
25	Finland (FIN)	1	0	0	1
25	Poland (POL)	1	0	0	1
25	Portugal (POR)	1	0	0	1
25	Romania (ROM)	1	0	0	1
25	Spain (ESP)	1	0	0	1
32	Great Britain (GBR)	0	2	4	6
33	Mexico (MEX)	0	2	1	3
33	Switzerland (SUI)	0	2	1	3
35	Estonia (EST)	0	1	4	5
36	Ireland (IRL)	0	1	3	4
37	Mongolia (MGL)	0	1	1	2
38	Hungary (HUN)	0	1	0	1
38	Kenya (KEN)	0	1	0	1
38	Latvia (LAT)	0	1	0	1
38	Norway (NOR)	0	1	0	1
38	Slovenia (SLO)	0	1	0	1
38	Venezuela (VEN)	0	1	0	1
44	Belgium (BEL)	0	0	3	3
Totals (44 entries)		143	141	140	424

Preceded by 1997 XVIII; Copenhagen, Denmark	2001; XIX; Rome, Italy	Succeeded by 2005 XX; Melbourne, Australia
