= 2013 Summer Deaflympics =

2013 multi-sport event for deaf people in Sofia, Bulgaria

22nd Summer Deaflympics
- Host city: Sofia
- Country: Bulgaria
- Nations: 83
- Athletes: 2711
- Sport: 17 sports (20 disciplines)
- Events: 203
- Opening: July 26, 2013
- Closing: August 4, 2013
- Opened by: Rosen Plevneliev
- Main venue: Armeets Arena / Vasil Levski National Stadium
- Website: sofia 2013

Summer

Winter

The 2013 Summer Deaflympics (Bulgarian: 2013 летни дефлимпийски игри), officially known as the 22nd Summer Deaflympics (Bulgarian: 22-ра лятна глуха олимпиада), was an international multi-sport event that took place in Sofia, Bulgaria from July 26 to August 4, 2013. The marathon had been held before in Füssen, Germany on 21 July.
Sofia was hosting the biggest sports event for deaf athletes for a second time. In the past the Bulgarian capital hosted the 1993 Summer Deaflympics, thus becoming only the second city, together with Copenhagen, which has hosted two Summer Deaflympics.

The 2013 games were scheduled for Athens, Greece, but the city decline the hosting rights citing no Organising Committee for the event and economic turmoil in the country. Athens is now scheduled to host the 2029 Summer Deaflympics

== Sports ==
The sports offered at the 2013 Summer Deaflympics was held in 19 disciplines, including 14 individual sports and 5 team sports:

=== Individual sports ===
- Athletics (44)
- Badminton (5)
- Bowling (8)
- Cycling (9)
  - Road (3W+4M=7)
  - Mountain biking (2)
- Judo (7M+6W+2Open+1Mens team+1 Men Kata=17)
- Karate (5M+4W+2Open+2KATA+1kata team men+1kumite team men=15)
- Orienteering (8)
- Shooting (5W+6M=11)
- Swimming (38)
- Table tennis (7)
- Taekwondo (4W+4M+5poomsae=13)
- Tennis (5)
- Wrestling (14)
  - Freestyle (7)
  - Greco-Roman (7)

=== Team sports ===
- Basketball (2)
- Football (2)
- Handball (1)
- Volleyball (4)
  - Beach (2)
  - Indoor (2)

== Venues ==
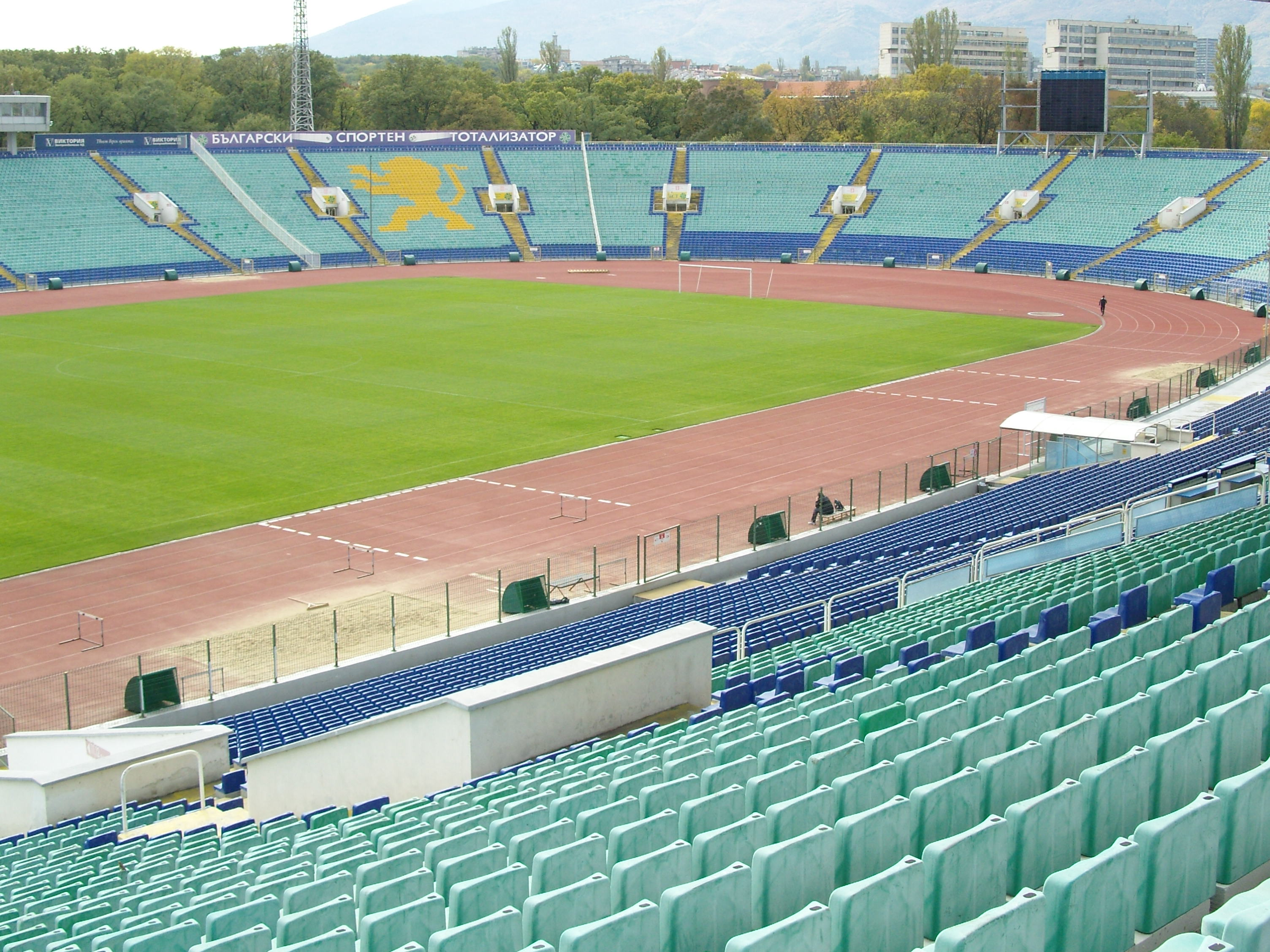
Vassil Levski National Stadium

- Armeets Arena was announced as the venue of the 2013 Summer Deaflympics opening and closing ceremonies in February 2013. It was also announced as venue of volleyball.
- Vasil Levski National Stadium is the venue of athletics and football finals.
- Carlsberg National Tennis Center - Tennis
- Universiada Hall – Basketball
- Overgas Hall – Basketball
- Borisova gradina Velodrome – Cycling
- Winter Palace of Sports – Table tennis
- Mega Extreme Sky City Mall – Bowling
- Riu Resort and Spa Pravets – Football
- National Sports Academy – Beach volleyball, handball, karate, judo, taekwondo
- MoI Shooting Range Geo Milev – Shooting
- Spartak Sofia Aquatics Centre – Swimming
- Sofia Sports Hall – Table tennis
- Dema Sports Complex – Tennis
- Hristo Botev Hall – Badminton
- Zapaden Park – Orienteering
- Füssen Course – Marathon

== Medal table ==
* Host nation (Host countries (Bulgaria/Germany))

| Rank | Nation | Gold | Silver | Bronze | Total |
|---|---|---|---|---|---|
| 1 | Russia (RUS) | 67 | 52 | 58 | 177 |
| 2 | Ukraine (UKR) | 21 | 30 | 37 | 88 |
| 3 | South Korea (KOR) | 19 | 11 | 12 | 42 |
| 4 | Belarus (BLR) | 12 | 11 | 4 | 27 |
| 5 | China (CHN) | 12 | 5 | 8 | 25 |
| 6 | United States (USA) | 9 | 8 | 12 | 29 |
| 7 | Turkey (TUR) | 7 | 9 | 17 | 33 |
| 8 | Iran (IRI) | 7 | 4 | 21 | 32 |
| 9 | Kenya (KEN) | 6 | 5 | 5 | 16 |
| 10 | Lithuania (LTU) | 4 | 5 | 4 | 13 |
| 11 | Venezuela (VEN) | 4 | 4 | 5 | 13 |
| 12 | Italy (ITA) | 4 | 3 | 5 | 12 |
| 13 | Chinese Taipei (TPE) | 3 | 12 | 9 | 24 |
| 14 | Germany (GER)* | 3 | 6 | 5 | 14 |
| 15 | Hungary (HUN) | 3 | 0 | 1 | 4 |
| 16 | Japan (JPN) | 2 | 10 | 9 | 21 |
| 17 | France (FRA) | 2 | 6 | 3 | 11 |
| 18 | Poland (POL) | 2 | 1 | 1 | 4 |
| 19 | Cuba (CUB) | 2 | 0 | 0 | 2 |
| 19 | Puerto Rico (PUR) | 2 | 0 | 0 | 2 |
| 21 | Bulgaria (BUL)* | 1 | 4 | 6 | 11 |
| 22 | Sweden (SWE) | 1 | 1 | 2 | 4 |
| 23 | Australia (AUS) | 1 | 1 | 1 | 3 |
| 23 | Estonia (EST) | 1 | 1 | 1 | 3 |
| 23 | Portugal (POR) | 1 | 1 | 1 | 3 |
| 23 | Slovakia (SVK) | 1 | 1 | 1 | 3 |
| 27 | Croatia (CRO) | 1 | 1 | 0 | 2 |
| 28 | Macau (MAC) | 1 | 0 | 1 | 2 |
| 29 | India (IND) | 1 | 0 | 0 | 1 |
| 29 | Kazakhstan (KAZ) | 1 | 0 | 0 | 1 |
| 29 | Norway (NOR) | 1 | 0 | 0 | 1 |
| 29 | Switzerland (SUI) | 1 | 0 | 0 | 1 |
| 33 | Great Britain (GBR) | 0 | 2 | 3 | 5 |
| 34 | Czech Republic (CZE) | 0 | 2 | 1 | 3 |
| 34 | South Africa (RSA) | 0 | 2 | 1 | 3 |
| 36 | Brazil (BRA) | 0 | 1 | 3 | 4 |
| 36 | Mongolia (MGL) | 0 | 1 | 3 | 4 |
| 38 | Argentina (ARG) | 0 | 1 | 1 | 2 |
| 38 | Spain (ESP) | 0 | 1 | 1 | 2 |
| 40 | Greece (GRE) | 0 | 1 | 0 | 1 |
| 41 | Austria (AUT) | 0 | 0 | 2 | 2 |
| 41 | Indonesia (INA) | 0 | 0 | 2 | 2 |
| 43 | Armenia (ARM) | 0 | 0 | 1 | 1 |
| 43 | Cyprus (CYP) | 0 | 0 | 1 | 1 |
| 43 | Latvia (LAT) | 0 | 0 | 1 | 1 |
| 43 | Mexico (MEX) | 0 | 0 | 1 | 1 |
| 43 | Moldova (MDA) | 0 | 0 | 1 | 1 |
| 43 | Nigeria (NGR) | 0 | 0 | 1 | 1 |
| 43 | Turkmenistan (TKM) | 0 | 0 | 1 | 1 |
| Totals (49 entries) | | 203 | 203 | 253 | 659 |

| Preceded by 2009 XXI; Taipei | Summer Deaflympics; XXII; Sofia | Succeeded by 2017 XXIII; Samsun (TUR) |
