= World Deaf Football Championships =

International football competition for deaf people

- Status: active
- Genre: sports event
- Dates: May, June, July
- Frequency: 4 Years
- Inaugurated: 2008
- Organiser: CISS / Deaf International Football Association (DIFA)

The World Deaf Football Championships is a quadrennial global competitions in the association football sport for deaf people. It is organised by the International Committee of Sports for the Deaf (CISS) and Deaf International Football Association (DIFA) and was first held in 2008.

== Results ==
=== Football ===
Edition	Year	Host	Dates	Nations played	Men			Women			Ref
Edition	Year	Host	Dates	Nations played	Gold	Silver	Bronze	Gold	Silver	Bronze	
1	2008	Greece, Patras	1–12 July	15 (M); 5 (W)	GER	TUR	FRA	RUS	GER	GBR	
2	2012	Turkey, Ankara	16–28 July	15 (M); 5 (W)	TUR	EGY	UKR	USA	RUS	GER	
3	2016	Italy, Agropoli, Capaccio, Salerno	19 June – 2 July	16 (M); 6 (W)	TUR	GER	RUS	USA	RUS	GBR	
4	2023	Malaysia, Kuala Lumpur	20 September – 8 October	19 (M); 5 (W)	UKR	JPN	SEN	USA	TUR	POL	

=== U23 Football ===
14 March 2026 – 26 March 2026 Location Chonburi, Thailand.

=== Futsal ===
==== World Deaf Futsal Ranking ====
Source:

==== Deaflympics ====
Edition	Year	Host	Dates	Nations played	Men			Women			Ref
Edition	Year	Host	Dates	Nations played	Gold	Silver	Bronze	Gold	Silver	Bronze	
1	2023	Turkey, Erzurum	2–12 March	11 (M); 9 (W)	IRI	JPN	BRA	ESP	BRA	GER	

==== Men ====
#	Year	1st	2nd	3rd	4th	Teams	Ref
1	1997	BEL	HOL	SLO	RUS	7	
2	2007	UKR	THA	ITA	RUS	24	
3	2011	IRI	TUR	RUS	BUL	16	
4	2015	IRI	THA	RUS	HOL	11	
5	2019	ESP	SUI	RUS	SWE	16	
6	2023	IRI	SWE	JPN	THA	14	
7	2025	IRI	BRA	ITA	CRO	18	

==== Women ====
#	Year	1st	2nd	3rd	4th	Teams	Ref
1	2007	GER	RUS	ENG	NOR	11	
2	2011	RUS	DEN	GER	BEL	12	
3	2015	RUS	BRA	GER	ITA	13	
4	2019	BRA	POL	GER	HOL	12	
5	2023	JPN	BRA	ENG	GER	6	
6	2025	ESP	BRA	POL	IRL	12	

=== U21 Futsal ===
==== Men ====
1. 2022: Iran – Kazakhstan – Uzbekistan
2. 2024: Iran – Kazakhstan – Brazil

==== Women ====
1. 2022: Unknown
2. 2024: Not held

=== U18 Futsal ===
1st World Deaf U18 Futsal Championships 2017 in Thailand

=== Futsal Club ===
World Deaf Futsal Club Championships 2026

=== Beach Soccer ===
DIFA – Deaf International Football Association

== Medals (Football) ==
=== Men ===
Rank	Nation	Gold	Silver	Bronze	Total
1	Turkey	2	1	0	3
2	Germany	1	1	0	2
3	Ukraine	1	0	1	2
4	Egypt	0	1	0	1
4	Japan	0	1	0	1
6	France	0	0	1	1
6	Russia	0	0	1	1
6	Senegal	0	0	1	1
Totals (8 entries)		4	4	4	12

=== Women ===
Rank	Nation	Gold	Silver	Bronze	Total
1	United States	3	0	0	3
2	Russia	1	2	0	3
3	Germany	0	1	1	2
4	Turkey	0	1	0	1
5	United Kingdom	0	0	2	2
6	Poland	0	0	1	1
Totals (6 entries)		4	4	4	12

== Medals (Futsal) ==
Rank	Nation	Gold	Silver	Bronze	Total
1	Iran (IRI)	4	0	0	4
2	Russia (RUS)	2	1	3	6
3	Spain (ESP)	2	0	0	2
4	Brazil (BRA)	1	4	0	5
5	Germany (GER)	1	0	3	4
6	Japan (JPN)	1	0	1	2
7	Belgium (BEL)	1	0	0	1
7	Ukraine (UKR)	1	0	0	1
9	Thailand (THA)	0	2	0	2
10	Poland (POL)	0	1	1	2
11	Denmark (DEN)	0	1	0	1
11	Netherlands (NED)	0	1	0	1
11	Sweden (SWE)	0	1	0	1
11	Switzerland (SUI)	0	1	0	1
11	Turkey (TUR)	0	1	0	1
16	England (ENG)	0	0	2	2
16	Italy (ITA)	0	0	2	2
18	Slovenia (SLO)	0	0	1	1
Totals (18 entries)		13	13	13	39

== See also ==
- Football at the Deaflympics
- European Deaf Football Championships
- Asian Deaf Football Championships
- African Deaf Football Championships
- Pan American Deaf Football Championships
