= ID sports in Cameroon =

ID sports in Cameroon are played in the country by people with intellectual disabilities. These sports are governed by Cameroonian Federation of Sports the Intellectually Disabled (FECASDI) and Special Olympics Cameroon. People with intellectual disabilities in Cameroon lack the same access to educational opportunities as people with other disability types in Cameroon. Development for sporting opportunities for them began in 1995, when Special Olympics came to Cameroon. Since then, other development activities have taken place, focusing on ID football and ID sport in general. Funding for ID sports is often limited.

National ID sports competitions have taken place, including ones in 2008, 2009 and 2012. National ID football tournaments have also taken place in Cameroon. Sports on the programs for these competitions have included athletics, volleyball, football, and draughts. Historically, Cameroon has had some difficulties in sending ID sportspeople abroad to compete. They have missed several major competitions because of funding and visa issues.

== Governance ==
Intellectual disability sport is governed by two organizations in Cameroon, Cameroonian Federation of Sports the Intellectually Disabled (FECASDI) (Note: The name of the organization in French is, Federation Camerounaise Des Sports Pour Deficients Intellectuals(Fecasdi).) and Special Olympics Cameroon. (Note: The name of the organization in French is, Special olympics Cameroun.)

Special Olympics Cameroon was created in 2005. That year, the Chairman of the Board was Christophe Ampouam and Director was Jean-Marie Aléokol Mabiemé. Both were still in those roles in 2007 and 2008. Special Olympics Cameroon officially launched major programming in 2007. Headquarters for the organization are in Mvog Ada, a neighborhood in Yaounde.

FECASDI is one of four member organizations of the Cameroonian Paralympic Committee. The organization's president is Jean-Marie Aléokol Mabiemé. The organization is based in Yaoundé. The federation is in charge of appointing members to the national squad, representing Cameroon at International Sports Federation for Persons with Intellectual Disability (INAS) sanctioned competitions.

== Culture and development ==
Cultural and institutional issues are a problem for intellectual disability sportspeople in Cameroon. Unlike people with physical disabilities, many ID sportspeople do not have access to appropriate education that specifically addresses their needs. They end up penalized because society provides no means to allow them to adequately support themselves. FECASD is trying to change these attitudes some by doing outreach to people with intellectual disabilities using sports as a vehicle to better their lives.

Special Olympics first arrived in Cameroon in 1995, with the goal of assisting people with intellectual disabilities to fully integrate into Cameroonian society. Special Olympics Cameroon was founded in 2005, bring the movement out of a ten-year dormant period. In 2006, a Special Olympics trainer came from the Ivory Coast to work with football coaches and trainers who work with sportspeople with intellectual disabilities to demonstrate how they can be better integrated into football programs.

International development of intellectual disability sport has seen Cameroon receive international assistance. In 2013, FECASDI hosted a regional conference where issues about the development of ID sport in Africa were discussed. One of the major issues brought up by Aléokol and International Sports Federation for Persons with Intellectual Disability (INAS) Executive Director Nick Parr was that there were no ID athletes from Africa who competed at the 2012 Summer Paralympics in London.

In 2014, New Zealand professor Jan Burns traveled to Cameroon as part of an Agitos Foundation funded project to talk about capacity creation for ID sports in the region. The workshop was attended by 40 total people from several countries including Cameroon, Gabon, Central African Republic and Chad. The government has made a commitment that sports for people with intellectual disabilities are to be played under decent condition, reaffirming this position at the national championships in 2015.

== Funding ==
INAS has suggested that funding does not need to be a major issue in the develop of ID sports in Cameroon and the rest of Africa. INAS member federations, such as Cameroon's FECASDI, can work with INAS, with INAS serving as a bridge between federations and sponsors. INAS also said federations can work to find volunteers to overcome some of the funding gap. Inside Cameroon though, FECASDI President Aléokol has spent large amounts of his own money in order to support ID athletes. According to Aléokol, those in schools and in the government who focus who on money as it relates to supporting ID athletes end up stripping away some of the humanity required to support people with disabilities.

== National competitions ==
A Special Olympics regional competition was held in 2008 at stade Roumdé-Adjia. Delegations from Central, North and Far North regions participated. In ID football, Cresas de Garoua came away winners after defeating Central Region 2–1 in the final. Aboubacar scored the first goal for his team off a pass from Baba Fidèle. Baba Fidèle then scored the second goal for his team. Onguéné scored in the second half for Central. The North Region finished first in total medals, winning nine out of the twelve available medals. They won two gold, four silvers and three bronze medals. Finishing in second was the Far North with two medals, a gold and a bronze. Central finished third with one gold medal. One of the medals won by the North was claimed by Daniel Foka. At the 2009 edition of the competition, ID football and athletics were both on the program. The Central Region won the football final after defeating Pere Monti Social Centre of Ambam 1–0 in the final. The only participants in the athletics competition were athletes from the Pere Monti Social Centre. The Games were held again in 2012.

There is a national ID sports competition organized by FECASDI. Sports on the program include athletics, volleyball, football, and draughts. The 2015 edition was held at the Stade Mateco at the University of Yaounde. The rules for ID football at the competition included the game having two 25 minute periods, five players per side, and no offside rule. Two teams took part, Jeunes Manteaux d'Efoulan and Colombe. Both teams were from Cameroon's capital.

== International competitions ==
Historically, Cameroon has had some difficulties in sending ID sportspeople abroad to compete. Special Olympics Cameroon was supposed to send a delegation in 2011 to Athens World Games. One of the members of the team would have been track and field competitor Salomon Oyono. No ID sportspeople were included as part of Cameroon's 2011 All-Africa Games delegation.

Cameroon was unable to send any ID athletes to an IPC sanctioned athletics competition in Manchester in March 2012. The inability to send sportspeople meant the country was unable to qualify any ID sports people for the 2012 Summer Paralympics because athletes could not participate in qualifying competitions and get internationally classified. The national ID sports federation in Cameroon had to pay a penalty of €11,000 (7,150,000 XOF) for their non-participation. Expecting government funding to cover the cost to participate in Manchester and with the government unaware of the existence of the request, lack of funding from the government was the primary reason for their inability to participate in the competition. Federation representatives planned then to try to send their athletes to a competition later in the year in Portugal to try to get their athletes classified and eligible for London. The organizations's Secretary General Emmanuel Wonyu expressed concern at that time that they might be suspended by INAS and wanted to avert that from happening.

Cameroon was scheduled to send a delegation to the 2014 INAS World Indoor Athletics Championships that took place from February 28 to March 2 in Reims, France. The team was scheduled to depart on February 25, and included Salomon Oyono, Effa Théophile, Josée Onguene, Cyrille Tsanga, Eric Nfendeu, Salomon Amougou, Nathan Onana Awono and Elysée Onguene. The delegation was also supposed to included Jean-Marie Aleokol Mabieme, and Dr Olinga Ubald. Despite a farewell ceremony being held, the team could not travel at the last minute because their visas were denied.

=== Representatives ===
Cameroon has had a number of international representatives in ID sports.

Sportsperson	Sport	Events	Ref
Salomon Oyono	Athletics	shot put 400m	
Effa Théophile	Athletics	800m 4 × 200 m	
Josée Onguene	Athletics	100m 200m 400m 1500m	
Cyrille Tsanga	Athletics	60m	
Eric Nfendeu	Athletics	3000m walk	
Salomon Amougou	Athletics	long jump	
Nathan Onana Awono	Athletics	200m	
Elysée Onguene	Athletics	100m	
