= Blind sports in Cameroon =

Blind sports in Cameroon include goalball, torball, athletics, African wrestling, judo and 5-a-side football. Blind sports first began in the 2000s, with Cameroon participating in national and international competitions, and hosting workshops. In 2010, a new law was passed to try to increase enforcement of making buildings handicap accessible.

Sport for the blind in Cameroon is governed by Cameroonian Sports Federation for the Visually Impaired (FECASDEV). The organization was created in 1999, when they were founded as the Sportive Association of Blind and Partially Sighted of Cameroon. They are a member of the International Blind Sports Federation (IBSA) and the Cameroonian Paralympic Committee. Blind sport is also supported by clubs and associations such as Club for the Blind Youth of Cameroon (CJARC) and PROMHANDICAM Yaounde.

== History ==
Historically, a number of blind sports have been practiced in Cameroon including Cameroon, goalball, blind football, athletics, African wrestling, and judo.

Torball has been played in Cameroon for a number of years, with several other African countries in the region also playing it including Tunisia, Algeria, and Nigeria. Goalball was a late arrival to the blind sports community in Cameroon. The sport was introduced in the 2000s. Prior to that, the major ball sport for blind people in Cameroon was torball. In November 2003, a three-day blind football referee development workshop took place in Cameroon.

Goalball was contested at the 2006 Champion of Cameroon in Handicap Sports that took place at the Higher Institute of Youth and Sports. PROMHANDICAM won the event, defeating CJARC 17 - 9 in the final.

Cameroon was scheduled to participate in the men's event at the 2007 IBSA World Torball Championships but withdrew at the last minute. The 2007 African Francophone Games for the Handicapped (JAPHAF) (Note: The name of the competition in French is, Jeux de l'avenir pour personnes handicapées d'Afrique (Japhaf).) took place in Nouakchott, Mauritania. At those Games, Cameroon won a single medal. At the 2009 edition of the African Francophone Games for the Handicapped in Niamey, Niger, Cameroon returned home with 23 medals, 10 gold, 7 silver and 6 bronze, finishing third on the medal table. Eleven countries took part in the event, with Cameroon sending 26 sportspeople. This included 8 sportspeople with vision impairments. Vision impaired runner Patrick Awa Bakounga left the Games with a trio of gold medals, finishing first in the 100 meters, 200 meters and 400 meters.

Much of the infrastructure in Cameroon is not designed with accessibility for people with disabilities in mind. Laws had been on the books for a number of years requiring facilities be accessible to people with physical, hearing and vision related disabilities. The laws though had rarely been enforced in many cases, often as a result of ignorance related to the challenges faced by people with disabilities. A new law was passed in 2010 to try to insure greater and better compliance in terms of making buildings accessible. When the 2010 law on accommodation came into force, the 1983 law related to the protection of persons with disabilities was also repealed.

In 2011, national team para-sportspeople for athletics trained on a dirt covered esplandande at Stade Omnisport de Yaoundé. Following the 2011-2012 domestic season, Camtel Yaoundé organized a men's and women's national goalball club championship. The men's final saw Rouffignac go up against Club for the Blind Youth of Cameroon (CJARC). (Note: The name of the organization in French is, Club des jeunes aveugles réhabilités du Cameroun.) The match was close with CJARC coming out ahead by a score of 4 - 3. In the women's final, Fadi beat BGSA 13 - 3. The domestic season again took place for 2013–2014. Following the conclusion of the season, Camtel Yaoundé hosted the men's national club championship, with four teams taking part. These teams were Evangelical College Goalball Club of Douala), (Note: The name of the club in French is, Collège évangélique goalball club de Douala.) Cispam Goalball Club of Bafoussam, (Note: The name of the club in French is, Cispam goalball club de Bafoussam.) Mount Cameroon Buea Goalball (Note: The name of the club in French is, Mont Cameroon goalball de Buea.) and PROMHANDICAM Yaounde.

In 2014, a national technical center for blind football opened in Cameroon. This was done as part of efforts by the IBSA to bring the football resources to Africa to allow for African-based and supported growth of the sport, instead of Europeans going to Africa to develop the sport without building the local infrastructure. In 2014, Cameroonian para-sportspeople participated in the Queen's Baton Relay ahead of the 2014 Commonwealth Games. One of the reasons they participated in the Relay was to try to bring attention to para-sports in Cameroon, and to assist in changing the perception of para-athletics in their country. The goal was to try to get people to think of para-athletics as a normal and acceptable sport.

In September 2016 at the end of the 2015-2016 disability sports season, a national blind football cup was held. The final involved Derouffignac and PROMHANDICAM Yaounde (Note: The name of the organization in French is, Promhandicam de Yaoundé.) with Promhandicam emerging victorious after the game ended 1 - 1 in regulation time. The game went to penalty kicks, with Promhandicam scoring two to Derouffignac's zero. Following the match, Charles Atangana from Derouffignac and André Ndo of Promhandicam were honored for being the best player and leading scorer respectively.

== Governance ==
Cameroonian Sports Federation for the Visually Impaired (FECASDEV) (Note: The name of the organization in French is, Fédération camerounaise de sports pour déficients visuels (Fécasdev).) is the national sports federation for people with vision impairments. The organization is one of four member federations of the Cameroonian Paralympic Committee and is a member of the International Blind Sports Federation (IBSA).

The organization's history dates back to 1999, when they were founded as the Sportive Association of Blind and Partially Sighted of Cameroon. During 2010 and 2011, their status changed as they were formally recognized by law, with their status inside Cameroon's sporting infrastructure changing. They have been involved with organizing goalball and blind football competitions in Cameroon.

== Clubs and associations ==
Blind sport in Cameroon is supported by local clubs and schools, and via activities at conferences and other events. Club for the Blind Youth of Cameroon (CJARC) is an association supporting blind youth. The club has been playing both goalball and torball for over 20 years. In 2006, they supported a number of sporting activities for the blind at their club including athletics, African wrestling, judo and goalball. The club was still active supporting women's goalball in 2014, 2015 and 2016.

Another association supporting disability sports is PROMHANDICAM Yaounde. In 2004, they were supporting wheelchair basketball and goalball. That year, the club was visited by England's Prince Edward.

== National blind sports teams and international sportspeople ==
Cameroon has been represented internationally in several blind sports including athletics, goalball and football.

=== Athletics ===
The country also a delegation to the 2014 and 2015 IPC Athletics Grand Prix Dubai. Andre Ndo Andeme participated both years, winning in the men's T12 100 meters in 2014 and finishing second in 2015. Vision impaired runner Charles Christol Atangana Ntsama won three medals in 2015 of the thirteen total claimed by Cameroon at the event. He claimed gold in the men's T11 100 meter event in a time of 12.03 seconds and set a A qualifying time for the 2016 Summer Paralympics. Cameroon sent a delegation of 11 athletes and 2 guides to the 2015 edition. Two women, Irène Ngono Noah and Hermine Guemo Talla, made their international debut for Cameroon at the 2015 edition. Three vision impaired athletes qualified for the 2015 IBSA World Games and the 2015 IPC Athletics World Championships at the Dubai Grand Prix. They were Cristol Charles Atangana Ntsama in the 200 meter and 400 meter events, Ndo Andeme in the Men's T12 200 meter event and Patrick Awa Bakounga in the 400 meter.

In 2016, the country had 39 athletes registered with the International Paralympic Committee. A number of these were in the vision impaired classes of T11, T12 and T13.

Athlete	Gender	Date of birth	Disciplines	National Team Debut	Competitions	Registered 2016	Ref
Cristol Charles Atangana Ntsama	Male		T11 100m		2015 IPC Athletics Grand Prix Dubai 2015 Fazaa International 2015 All Africa Games	Yes	
Mohamed Mohamed Garba	Male		T12 200		2015 Fazaa International Athletics Competition	Yes	
Andre Patrick Ndo Andeme	Male	August 11, 1985	T12 100m T12 200m		2014 Fazaa International 2015 IPC Athletics Grand Prix Dubai 2015 Fazaa International	Yes	
Judith Mariette Lebog	Female		T11 100m		2016 IPC Athletics Grand Prix Dubai	Yes	
Irène Ngono Noah	Female	1988	T12 200m	2015 IPC Athletics Grand Prix Dubai	2015 IPC Athletics Grand Prix Dubai 2015 Fazaa International Athletics Competition	No	
Hermine Guemo Talla	Female	1989	T11 200m	2015 IPC Athletics Grand Prix Dubai	2015 IPC Athletics Grand Prix Dubai 2015 Fazaa International Athletics Competition	No	

=== Blind football team ===
The team is nicknamed the Indomitable Blind Football Lions (French: Lions indomptables cecifootbal). In 2015 and 2016, the national team had 12 members. They are captained by Patrick Bakounga Awa. Other members of the 2015 and 2016 national team included Nsangou Arouna, Christian Nyobia Njoya, Charles Cristol Atangana, André Patrick Andeme and Mohomed Garba. They were coached by Lucien Mbanga in 2015 and 2016. Club for the Blind Youth of Cameroon (CJARC) (French: Club des jeunes aveugles réhabilités du Cameroun) provided a development pathway for a number of players, with four club members being chosen for Cameroon's national team at the time of its establishment.

Douala, Cameroon hosted the 2015 IBSA Blind Football African Championship in October of that year. The tournament was a qualifier for the 2016 Summer Paralympics in Rio. Cameroon played Morocco in the final, losing 0 - 2. Other teams in the competition included Egypt, Senegal and Mali. Morocco's win against Cameroon secured them a berth to the Rio Games. Cameroon beat Senegal 2 - 0 in the semifinals to qualify for the finals. The roster for the game against Senegal included Nyobia Njoya, Zogning Lontsi Fulbert, Kaze Gaetan, Erick Michel Bonfeu, Andeme Patrick Ndo, Christol Atangana Ntsama, Ferdinand Atangana Ntsama, Mohamed Garga, Partick Bakounga Awa, and Nsan Gou Arouna. They were coached by Lucien Mbonga. Their guide was Willy Djiepmo. They opened play by defeating the Ivory Coast 5 - 0 in group play, and then beat Mali 1 - 0. Charles Cristol Atangana and André Patrick Andeme Ndo both scored a pair of goals in their opener. Captain Patrick Bakounga Awa scored one goal in the team's game against the Ivory Coast and put in a second in goal for the tournament against Mali. Cameroon's Roger Milla watched the final between the host country and Morocco. Their final game of group play was against Senegal, whom they defeated 3 - 0. The victory put them at the top of their group.

The Lions have been internationally ranked. On January 1, 2016, they were ranked twenty-fourth in the world, one spot behind Greece and one spot ahead of India. On July 31, 2016, they were ranked twenty-fifth in the world, one spot behind Georgia and one spot ahead of India.

Since the team's inception, a number of players have made caps for the team.

Player	Number	National Team Years	Competition Appearances	Goals	Ref
Christian Nyobia Njoya	1	2015, 2016	2015 IBSA Blind Football African Championship		
Zogning Lontsi Fulbert	16	2015	2015 IBSA Blind Football African Championship		
Kaze Gaetan	2	2015	2015 IBSA Blind Football African Championship		
Erick Michel Bonfeu	3	2015	2015 IBSA Blind Football African Championship		
André Patrick Andeme Ndo	4	2015, 2016	2015 IBSA Blind Football African Championship	2 vs. Ivory Coast (2015)	
Charles Christol Atangana Ntsama	5	2015, 2016	2015 IBSA Blind Football African Championship	2 vs. Ivory Coast (2015)	
Ferdinand Atangana Ntsama	7	2015	2015 IBSA Blind Football African Championship		
Mohomed Garba	9	2015, 2016	2015 IBSA Blind Football African Championship		
Patrick Bakounga Awa	10 (Captain)	2015, 2016	2015 IBSA Blind Football African Championship	1 vs. Ivory Coast (2015) 1 vs. Mali (2015)	
Nsangou Arouna	11	2015, 2016	2015 IBSA Blind Football African Championship		

=== Goalball teams ===
Cameroon has participated in international goalball competitions, with the country having had both men and women's national teams competing abroad. Cameroon sent a team to the 2007 All-Africa Games. The roster included André Patrick Ndo Andeme, Hervé Paulain Nomy Ngoma, Luc Yombi Kifie, and Boulom Théophile R. Le Grand. Goalball was on the program for the 2008 African Francophone Games for the Handicapped, which Cameroon was originally scheduled to host in July, but the Ministry of Sports and Physical Education postponed them because of poor facilities and lack of access to quality equipment. The Games did not take place until August. The men's national goalball team won gold at the event after Cameroon beat the Central African Republic 11 - 1 in the first game, and 13 - 3 in the return match.

Cameroon has 13 players who had been classified internationally by the IBSA for the 2016 summer international goalball season. A number of these players have also represented Cameroon in athletics, including André Patrick Ndo Andeme and Simone Edwige Amandi Ngono. The women's national team assistant coach was Pascal Ele Mvondo.

Name	Gender	Birthday	Classification	Ref
Simone Edwige Amandi Ngono	Female	31/10/1991	B2	
Eliette Bruna Assampele	Female	17/05/1997	B1	
Charles Christole Atangana Ntsama	Male	22/09/1992	B1	
Patrick Bakounga Awa	Male	22/10/1986	B1	
Judith Kenekou	Female	22/05/1996	B1	
Judith Lebog Mariette	Female	13/05/1990	B1	
Malone Stephane Mollo Jules	Male	15/09/1996	B1	
Andre Patrick Ndo Andeme	Male	11/08/1985	B1	
Laurece Claire Ngansop Chimigni	Female	11/04/1998	B2	
Lucrece Raissa Ngansop Fobasso	Female	11/04/1998	B2	
Arouna Nsangou	Male	5/03/1992	B1	
Luc Yombi Kifie	Male	9/08/1986	B1	
