= Cameroon at the 2008 Summer Paralympics =

- IPC code: CMR
- NPC: Cameroonian Paralympic Committee

in Beijing
- Competitors: 0 in 0 sports
- Flag bearer: None
- Medals: Gold 0 Silver 0 Bronze 0 Total 0

Summer Paralympics appearances (overview)
- 2012; 2016; 2020; 2024

Cameroon did not participate at the 2008 Summer Paralympics because National Paralympic Committee's (NPC) was suspended by International Paralympic Committee (IPC) for failure to pay membership fees.

Going into the Beijing Games, Cameroon was one of a number of African countries that had yet to participate at the Paralympic Games. These countries were unable to participate because of internal development and financial problems.

Cameroon's specific issues involved as they related to the 2008 Games were IPC suspension for failure to pay membership fees, and lack the NPC not having organizational governance statutes. There were other conditions specific to internal organization of disability sport in Cameroon. These included three or four organizations claiming to be the country's legitimate NPC, and conflicts between these NPCs and Cameroon's Ministry of Sports and Physical Education (MINSEP).

Two Cameroon para-sportspeople that might have been eligible to represent the country at the 2008 Games included Francis Biwole Nkodo and Norbert Tsoungui.

== Background ==
Cameroon was a member of the international Paralympic movement by the 2000s. Cameroon, along with Guatemala, Guinea, Niger, Sierra Leone, Sudan and Uganda were originally supposed to participate in the 2000 Summer Paralympics in Sydney. For a variety of reasons, all these countries withdrew before the start of the Games.

They were one of a number of French speaking African countries who had not participated at a Summer Paralympic Games by 2008. Other countries included Congo and Togo, along with the English speaking countries of Liberia and Gambia, and Portuguese speaking Guinea-Bissau. This was a result of either lack of development of disability sport in the country or problems in financing international participation in disability sport.

== Relationship with the IPC ==
Cameroon had missed out on the ability to participate at the 2004 Games in Athens and the 2008 Games in Beijing because the NPC was tardy in paying membership fees to the International Paralympic Committee and were suspended around the time of both Games. At the time that the Cameroon was trying to find a way to pay the membership fees they owed the IPC in order to participate at the 2008 Games, the NPC owed a total of around 320,000 XOF (USD$577.07). Cameroon had hoped they could get unsuspended in time to compete in Beijing after having been re-suspended since 2005.

FECASH, which was one of four organizations serving as the NPC for Cameroon, lacked any statutes. Having statutes was a then requirement of the International Paralympic Committee to be a member of the IPC in good standing.

== National Paralympic Committee ==
Ahead of the 2008 Beijing Paralympics, it was not always clear which organization was the legitimate NPC for Cameroon. There were three or four potential candidates as the legitimate NPC: FECASH, the CPC, and two other organizations. The first was Cameroonian Sports Federation for People with Disabilities (FECASH). (Note: The name of the organization in French is Fédération camerounaise des sports pour personnes handicapées (Fécash)) The organization was founded in 1998. A second was Paralympic Club Cameroon (CPC) (Note: The name of the organization in French is Club paralympique camerounai) which also failed to get government approval before trying to become the IPC recognized NPC. In 2008 CPC was led by President Etienne Songa. Songa challenged the government's claim of failure for recognition. Songa claimed that FECASH, as a result of owing the IPC money, notified the IPC that the CPC should be recognized as the NPC for Cameroon. Songa's statements were supported by CPC Technical Director Jean-Marie Aléokol Mabiemé. The third organization was founded in 2004 by a former FECASH Vice President without approval from the government. The founder subsequently moved to the United States.

== Internal issues ==
There was internal disputes in Cameroon regarding the funding issues and the responsibility to pay the IPC. Then CPC President Etienne Songa said that the CPC had requested funds from the government to pay what they owed to the IPC by August 2008 to insure that Cameroon could participate at the 2008 Games. According to Songa, the Ministry of Sports and Physical Education (MINSEP) had never contributed to the CPC's budget, which explained why the CPC was unable to pay membership fees. Association of Sports for the Physically Handicapped (Note: The name of the organization in French is, Association des sportifs handicapés moteurs (Handisports)) President Alexandre Epouné called Cameroon's absence from the 2008 Games a national embarrassment.

The Ministry of Sports and Physical Education disputed some claims by the CPC regarding the reasons for the problems that left the country unable to send a team to the 2008 Games. One reason was that because there were four different committees claiming to be the CPC inside Cameroon. MINSEP also pointed out that FECASH, which was serving as the NPC for Cameroon, lacked any statutes. This undermined their claims of legitimacy in the eyes of the Ministry as having statutes was a then requirement of the International Paralympic Committee to be a member of the IPC in good standing.

An anonymous source at the Ministry of Sports and Physical Education alleged to Mboa.info that the creation of an alternative NPC to FECASH was an effort by some people "to find issues to make money or travel. The proof is that every time they left, they did not come back." (Note: The original statement in French was, «le but pour ces gens était de trouver des issues pour se faire de l'argent ou voyager. La preuve c'est que chaque fois qu'ils sont partis, ils ne sont pas revenus».)

== Sportspeople ==
One of the sportspeople that had been considered a potential participant to representing Cameroon in Beijing was athlete Francis Biwole Nkodo, whom the CPC thought had a real chance to medal in Beijing.

One of the sportspeople who had been hoping to represent Cameroon at the 2008 Games was Norbert Tsoungui. He said of the reason he was unable to participate, "Cameroon is absent because of lack of clarity in the management of disability sport in Cameroon. It is this uncertainty which led to the suspension of the Cameroon federation." (Note: The original statement in French was, «le Cameroun est absent à cause du flou qui règne dans la gestion du sport pour handicapés au Cameroun. C'est ce flou qui a conduit à la suspension de la fédération camerounaise.»)

== See also ==
- Cameroon at the 2008 Summer Olympics
