= Disability in Cameroon =

Disability in Cameroon refers to the experiences, rights, and living conditions of persons with disabilities in Cameroon, who represent a minority group within the country. Estimates of prevalence vary widely due to differences in methodology and underreporting, with reported figures ranging from below 2% in census data to over 10% in population-based studies. Social stigma and cultural perceptions also influence how disability is reported and experienced, contributing to invisibility in statistics and public life.

== Living conditions ==
=== Social stigma ===
Persons with disabilities in Cameroon face barriers to education, employment, healthcare, and social participation, and disability is often associated with poverty and limited access to services, with these challenges further compounded by social stigma and restricted access to opportunities, social and financial inclusion. Negative perceptions may lead to exclusion from the labour market, with affected individuals sometimes viewed as unreliable or incapable of performing regular tasks. These attitudes can limit access to employment, reduce economic independence, and contribute to social marginalization.

=== Vulnerability ===
Persons with disabilities in Cameroon are at increased risk of violence, including physical, sexual, and psychological abuse. Women with disabilities are particularly affected by gender-based violence (GBV), due to the intersection of gender inequality, disability, and dependence on caregivers, which can increase vulnerability and reduce access to reporting and support mechanisms.

Children and young people with disabilities also face heightened risks of abuse and neglect. However, such cases are often underreported due to stigma, fear of retaliation, limited awareness of reporting systems, and structural barriers in child protection services. Dependence on family members or caregivers may further reduce disclosure and access to protection.

Across both groups, barriers such as social stigma, limited accessibility of justice systems, and insufficient support services contribute to underreporting and challenges in protection and response.

=== Accusations of witchcraft and demonization ===
In some communities, epilepsy and other neurological conditions, such as autism, are associated with witchcraft, curses, spirit possession, or other supernatural causes. Such interpretations may generate fear and social distancing, and affected individuals may be perceived as dangerous or contagious. These beliefs can lead to discrimination, social isolation, prejudices and reduced marriage and employment opportunities. They may also encourage reliance on traditional or religious healing rather than biomedical treatment under conventional medicine, contributing to delayed diagnosis and limited access to healthcare.

Faith-based initiatives in Cameroon and other African contexts have sought to counter beliefs that attribute disability or disease to supernatural forces or promise miraculous cures. Church leaders and theologians have promoted responsible health messaging, discouraging practices such as abandoning medical treatment or assuming spiritual causes without proper assessment. These initiatives emphasize that individuals should be medically examined and diagnosed rather than judged based on assumptions about symptoms or supernatural explanations. They also highlight the risks of instructing persons with disabilities to abandon assistive devices or treatment based on claims of healing, which may lead to harm and reinforce stigma.

Within some Christian contexts in Cameroon, mental health conditions are often interpreted through both spiritual and biomedical frameworks, with pastoral care playing a significant role in how such conditions are understood and addressed. Church-based approaches may emphasise prayer, counselling, and spiritual support, while increasingly acknowledging the importance of psychological and psychiatric perspectives. Some initiatives within Christian communities seek to promote a more integrated understanding of mental health, encouraging collaboration with healthcare professionals and discouraging the exclusive attribution of mental illness to spiritual causes. This includes efforts to reduce stigma by reframing mental health conditions as issues requiring care and assessment rather than moral or spiritual failure, and by promoting referral to appropriate medical services when needed.

== Paralympic and disability sport ==
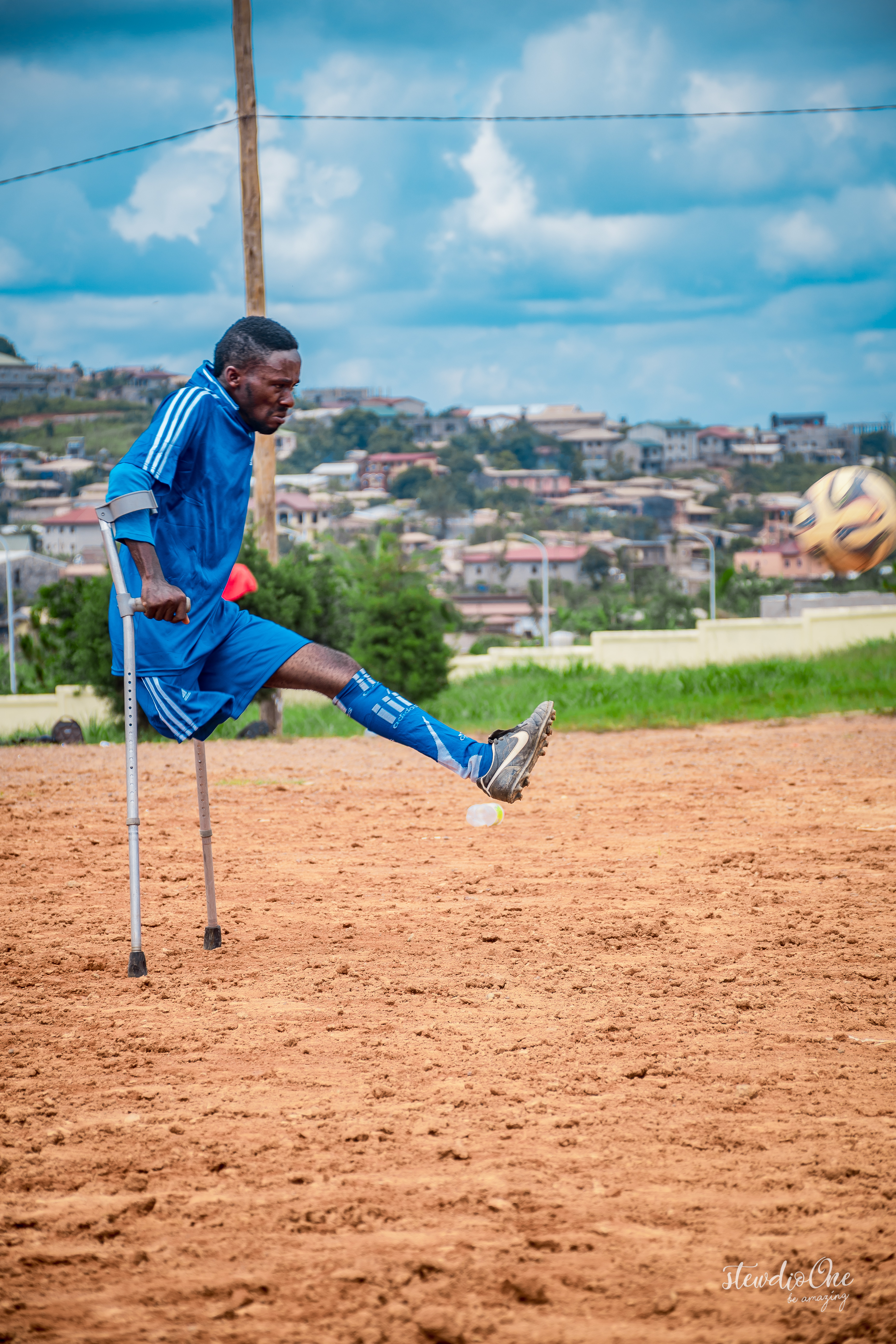
A Cameroonian amputee football player (Ngala Maimo Wajiri) during a match in 2019

Disability sport in Cameroon is organized through a national Paralympic structure composed of several federations representing different types of disabilities. These include federations for athletes with physical, visual, intellectual, and hearing impairments, which operate under the Cameroonian Paralympic Committee and are responsible for organizing competitions and selecting athletes for international events. These organizations were formally recognized following reforms in 2010–2011 aimed at promoting participation of persons with disabilities in sport.

Earlier, disability sport in Cameroon was coordinated by a single national federation, the Cameroonian Sports Federation for People with Disabilities (FECASH), established in 1998. This body oversaw multiple disability sport disciplines before being dissolved in 2011 and replaced by specialised federations covering different disability groups. The restructuring contributed to the development of specific sports programmes such as goalball, blind football, athletics, and other adapted disciplines. National championships and regional competitions are organised by these federations to support athlete development and participation in African and Paralympic events.

Cameroon has participated in international disability sport competitions through its Paralympic structures, although participation has sometimes been limited by funding, governance, and organizational challenges. Efforts to promote inclusive sport continue through national training programs, competitions, and collaboration with international disability sport organizations.
