= Cameroonian Sports Federation for People with Disabilities =

National sports federation in Cameroon

Fédération camerounaise des sports pour personnes handicapées
- Founded: 1998
- Dissolved: August 2011
- Purpose: Sport, Disability
- Location: Yaounde, Cameroon
- Region served: Cameroon
- Members: 4: Federation of Disabled Sport of Cameroon, Sports Association of Blind and Partially Sighted of Cameroon (ASAMC), National League Sports for the Deaf in Cameroon (LINASCAM), and Special Olympics Cameroon.
- Key people: Chairman: Abeng Mbozo'o

Cameroonian Sports Federation for People with Disabilities (FECASH; French: Fédération camerounaise des sports pour personnes handicapées (Fécash)) was one of the primary national sports federation for people with disabilities in Cameroon prior to the organization being dissolved in August 2011. It served as the country's National Paralympic Committee for many years. Problems with internal governance arose starting in the early 2000s and continued until the federation closed.

FECASH was one of the organizations to support the introduction of goalball in Cameroon. They also participated in United Nations' International Day of Persons with Disabilities activities.

== Governance ==
Cameroonian Sports Federation for People with Disabilities (FECASH) was created in 1998 for people with a variety of different types of disabilities. The federation was based on Doula, and had four member organizations: Federation of Disabled Sport of Cameroon, (Note: The name of the organization in French is, Fédération des Handicapés Sportifs du Cameroun.) Sports Association of Blind and Partially Sighted of Cameroon (ASAMC), (Note: The name of the organization in French is, Association Sportive des Aveugles et Malvoyants du Cameroun.) National League Sports for the Deaf in Cameroon (LINASCAM), (Note: The name of the organization in French is, Ligue Nationale des Sports pour Sourds au Cameroun.) and Special Olympics Cameroon. The offices for the Federation from 1998 to early 2010 were at the personal residence of Abeng Mbozo'o, a non-disabled Cameroon doctor. Mbozo'o served as the organizations chairman, with each of the member federations being represented with a Vice President position in FECASH.

=== History of governance ===
For a long while, the organization was largely run by the president after all the members resigned. During its early history, FECASH had trouble securing funding. For three years, they had an annual government grant of 4.5 million XOF (€6,854). After the initial three years, government terminated the subsidy.

FECASH was founded in 1998, and became affiliated with the International Paralympic Committee (IPC). At the time, the President of FECASH did not seek government approval prior to affiliating with the IPC. FECASH's original president subsequently moved to Japan. In 2004, a former FECASH Vice-President created a new NPC for Cameroon without approval from the government. He subsequently moved to the United States. In the late 2000s, a third NPC for Cameroon was then created after that called Cameroon Paralympic Club (CPC) (Note: The name of the organization in French is, Club paralympique camerounai.) which also failed to get government approval before trying to become the IPC recognized NPC. The CPC was led by President Etienne Songa. Songa challenged the government's claim of failure for recognition. Songa claimed that FECASH, as a result of owing the IPC money, had notified the IPC that the Cameroon Paralympic Club should be recognized as the NPC for Cameroon. Songa's statements were supported by CPC Technical Director Jean-Marie Aléokol Mabiemé. FECASH had other issues in the late 2000s and early 2010s. Having statues was a then requirement of the International Paralympic Committee to be a member of the IPC in good standing. FECASH lacked governing statues in 2008. These problems related to internal governance were one of the reasons why Cameroon was unable to inscribe any participants for the 2008 Summer Paralympics.

FECASH was restructured in March 2011, before being dissolved in July 2011 as a result of Law No. 2011-18 of 15 July 2011 related to the organization and promotion of Physical and Sporting Activities. It was replaced by the Cameroonian Sports Federation for the Visually Impaired (FECASDEV), (Note: The name of the organization in French is, Fédération camerounaise de Football (Fécafoot).) the Cameroonian Sports Federation for the Physically Disabled (FECASDEP), (Note: The name of the organization in French is, Fédération Camerounaise de Sports pour Déficients Physiques.) Cameroonian Federation of Sports the Intellectually Disabled (FECASDI) (Note: The name of the organization in French is, Federation Camerounaise Des Sports Pour Deficients Intellectuals.) and the Cameroonian Sports Federation for the Deaf (FECASSO). (Note: The name of the organization in French is, Fédération Camerounaise de Sports pour Sourds.) These four organizations were thane made members of the newly reformed Cameroonian Paralympic Committee.

Before the organization's dissolution, Chairman Mbozo'o blamed some of the organization's failures on the Government Minister Pierre Ismaël Bidoung Mkpatt for appointing members to FECASH's board who then were completely absent from governing the organization. He also blamed the Government not providing funding to the organization.

== History ==
FECASH supported the introduction of goalball in the country during the 2000s to diversify the number of sports available to people with vision impairments.

For the 2009 United Nations' International Day of Persons with Disabilities, FECASH organized nationwide sporting activities for people with disabilities. They held three regional wheelchair basketball tournaments, with the tournaments taking place in central Cameroon, southern Cameroon and coastal Cameroon. One of these tournaments took place in Douala, on the basketball courts of Military District 2. A goalball tournament also was organized at the Sports Palace in Yaounde. Deaf soccer, handball and basketball events also took place, with the Lions Indomptables Sourd playing a friendly match against a high school team from Nkomotou. The events also served as a celebration for the national delegation who went to Niamey, Niger for the 2009 African Francophone Games for the Handicapped. The team returned having finished third in the overall medal count, winning 23 medals, 10 gold, 7 silver and 6 bronze.

== See also ==
- Disability in Cameroon
