= Cameroonian Federation of Sports for the Intellectually Disabled =

National sports federation in Cameroon

Cameroonian Federation of Sports the Intellectually Disabled
- Federation Camerounaise Des Sports Pour Deficients Intellectuals
- Abbreviation: FECASDI
- Purpose: Competitive sports for people with disabilities
- Location: Yaounde, Cameroon
- Origins: Recognized following the dissolution of Cameroonian Sports Federation for People with Disabilities
- Region served: Cameroon
- Members: International Sports Federation for Persons with Intellectual Disability; Cameroonian Paralympic Committee
- Key people: President: Jean-Marie Aléokol Mabiemé

Cameroonian Federation of Sports the Intellectually Disabled (FECASDI) (French: Federation Camerounaise Des Sports Pour Deficients Intellectuals (Fecasdi)) is the national sports federation for sportspeople with intellectual disabilities competing in International Sports Federation for Persons with Intellectual Disability (INAS) and Paralympic events. They organize national ID sports championships. The federation was recognized by law in 2010, and then became a member of the Cameroonian Paralympic Committee in 2011. FECASDI has tried to get its sportspeople qualified for the 2012 Summer Paralympics. They have also hosted several conferences.

== Governance ==
Cameroonian Federation of Sports the Intellectually Disabled (FECASDI) is one of four member organizations of the Cameroonian Paralympic Committee. The organization's president is Jean Marie Aléokol. They are based in Yaoundé. The federation is in charge of appointing members to the national squad, representing Cameroon at International Sports Federation for Persons with Intellectual Disability (INAS) sanctioned competitions.

FECASDI organizes a national championship for ID sports. The championships include a number of sports including ID football, athletics and volleyball.

== History ==
Articles 36 and 37 of Law Nº2010 / 002 of April 2010, Protection and promotion of disabled persons (Note: The name of the law in French is, loi Nº2010/002 du avril 2010 portant protection et promotion des personnes handicapées.) saw the organization formally recognized by law in Cameroon. This was seen by the government as an important step in promoting physical activity for people with disabilities in the country.

The Cameroonian Sports Federation for People with Disabilities (FECASH) (Note: The name of the organization in French is, Fédération camerounaise des sports pour handicapés.) was dissolved in July 2011 as a result of Law No. 2011-18 of 15 July 2011 related to the organization and promotion of Physical and Sporting Activities. FECASH was replaced by Cameroonian Sports Federation for the Visually Impaired (FECASDEV), (Note: The name of the organization in French is, Fédération camerounaise de Football (Fécafoot).) the Cameroonian Sports Federation for the Physically Disabled (FECASDEP), (Note: The name of the organization in French is, Fédération Camerounaise de Sports pour Déficients Physiques.) FECASDI and the Cameroonian Sports Federation for the Deaf (FECASSO). (Note: The name of the organization in French is, Fédération Camerounaise de Sports pour Sourds.) These four organizations were then made members of the newly reformed Cameroonian Paralympic Committee.

Cameroon was unable to send any ID athletes to an IPC sanctioned athletics competition in Manchester in March 2012. The inability to send sportspeople meant the country was unable to qualify any ID sports people for the 2012 Summer Paralympics because athletes could not get qualified. The national ID sports federation in Cameroon had to pay a penalty of €11,000 (around 7,150,00 XOF) for their non-participation. Lack of funding from the government was the primary reason why Cameroon's ID sportspeople could not go to Manchester competition, with the government unaware that FECASDI had even put in a request for funding. Federation representatives planned then to try to send their athletes to a competition later in the year in Portugal to try to get their athletes classified and eligible for London. The organization's Secretary General Emmanuel Wonyu expressed concern at that time that they might be suspended by INAS and wanted to avert that from happening.

In 2013, FECASDI hosted a regional conference where issues about the development of ID sport in Africa were discussed. One of the major issues brought up by Aléokol and International Sports Federation for Persons with Intellectual Disability (INAS) Executive Director Nick Parr was that there were no ID athletes from Africa who competed at the 2012 Summer Paralympics in London.

In May 2014, the organization hosted an Agitos Foundation funded INAS workshop that sought to increase participation of African countries in intellectual disability sports on the international level. Among the people presenting was New Zealand professor Jan Burns. The workshop provided an overview of INAS governed sports and INAS hosted competitions. Forty people from several countries including Cameroon, Gabon, Central African Republic and Chad participated in the workshop, representing INAS members, Special Olympicsmembers, national sports federations and National Paralympic Committees. In April and May 2016, the organization hosted the 2016 INAS African Open International Futsal Tournament.
