= Rabia Belhaj Ahmed =

Tunisian Paralympic athlete

Personal information
- Native name: ربيعة بالحاج أحمد
- Born: December 15, 1982 (age 43)

Sport
- Disability: Intellectual impairment
- Disability class: T20, F20
Medal record
Women's para athletics (F20)
Representing Tunisia
Global Games
| Gold medal – first place | 2009 Liberec | 400 m hurdles |
| Gold medal – first place | 2009 Liberec | Long jump |

Rabia Belhaj Ahmed (Arabic: ربيعة بالحاج أحمد, born December 15, 1982), also spelled Rabia Benhaj Ahmed, is a Paralympian athlete from Tunisia competing mainly in category T20 and F20 events. She has held the IPC world record in 400m hurdles since 2003.

At the 2009 Global Games in Liberec, she won gold medals in 400m hurdles and long jump.

She competed in the 2012 Summer Paralympics in London.

== Athletics ==
- Women's Long Jump - F20
