= Fédération Camerounaise de Sports pour Sourds =

Cameroon sports governing body

- Founded: August 2011
- Purpose: Sport, Disability
- Location: Yaounde, Cameroon
- Origins: Founded following the dissolution of Fédération camerounaise des sports pour personnes handicapées
- Region served: Cameroon
- Key people: President: Pierre Valery Pemh

Cameroonian Sports Federation for the Deaf (FECASSO) (French: Fédération Camerounaise de Sports pour Sourds) is the national sports federation for people with hearing impairments in Cameroon.

== Governance ==
FECASSO is one of four member organizations of the Cameroonian Paralympic Committee (CNPC). Unlike the other three members, it does not have its activities supervised by the International Paralympic Committee. The President is Pierre Valery Pemha. In this role, he also serves as a Vice President of CNPC. He has held this role since 2011.

== History ==
Articles 36 and 37 of "loi Nº2010/002 du avril 2010 portant protection et promotion des personnes handicapées" saw the organization formally recognized by law in Cameroon. This was seen by the government as an important step in promoting physical activity for people with disabilities in the country.

Fédération camerounaise des sports pour handicapés (FECASH) was dissolved in July 2011 as a result of Law No. 2011-18 of 15 July 2011 related to the organization and promotion of Physical and Sporting Activities. It was replaced by Fédération Camerounaise de Sports pour Déficients Physiques (FECASDEP), Fédération Camerounaise de Sports pour Déficients Visuels (FECASDEV), Fédération Camerounaise de Sports pour Déficients Intellectuels (FECASDI) and Fédération Camerounaise de Sports pour Sourds (FECASSO). These four organizations were thane made members of the newly reformed Cameroonian Paralympic Committee. The process that dissolved FECASH and saw the formal creation of this organization began in March 2011.

From the organization's creation to at least September 2013, the organization had received zero funding from the government to support their operations.
