= Special Olympics Cameroon =

- Special olympics Cameroun
- Founded: 2005
- Purpose: Using sports to better integrate people with intellectual disabilities into society
- Location: Yaounde, Cameroon
- Region served: Cameroon
- Members: Special Olympics
- Key people: President Christophe Ampouam; Director Jean-Marie Aléokol Mabiemé

Special Olympics Cameroon (French: Special olympics Cameroun) is the national sports federation for people with intellectual disabilities. Founded in 2005, the Chairman of the Board was Christophe Ampouam and Director was Jean-Marie Aléokol Mabiemé.

The movement started in Cameroon in 1995, with the goal of assisting people with intellectual disabilities to fully integrate into society. Since then, Cameroon has sent Special Olympians abroad to compete, brought in a foreign trainer to teach people how work with sportspeople with intellectual disabilities and started a program called "Football for Hope."

Special Olympics Cameroon has organized a national region based competition for several years, including in 2008, 2009 and 2009. Sports on the program have included athletics and ID football.

== Governance ==
Special Olympics Cameroon was created in 2005. That year, the Chairman of the Board was Christophe Ampouam and Director was Jean-Marie Aléokol Mabiemé. Both were still in those roles in 2007 and 2008. Special Olympics Cameroon officially launched major programming in 2007. Headquarters for the organization are in Mvog Ada, a neighborhood in Yaounde.

== History ==
Special Olympics first arrived in Cameroon in 1995, with the goal of assisting people with intellectual disabilities to fully integrate into Cameroonian society. Special Olympics Cameroon has delegations to the Special Olympics World Games. In 2006, Special Olympics Cameroon sent a team to Spain to compete in the Spanish Special Olympics National Games. The team earned a bronze medal. That year, a trainer came from the Ivory Coast to work with football coaches and trainers who work with sportspeople with intellectual disabilities to demonstrate how they can be better integrated into football programs. In this period, they were member of the Cameroonian Sports Federation for People with Disabilities (FECASH). Special Olympics Cameroon was supposed to send a delegation in 2011 to Athens World Games. One of the members of the team would have been track and field competitor Salomon Oyono.

In 2007, Aléokol launched the "Football for Hope", a two-year program in 2007 to teach 250 people with intellectual disabilities about football. The program was supported by Cameroonian Football Federation (Fécafoot) and Special Olympics Cameroon. In establishing this program, Aléokol hoped to have enough players ready to potentially compete in the 2010 ID Football World Championships.

== Competitions ==
A Special Olympics regional competition was held in October 2008 at Stade Roumdé Adjia. Delegations from Central, North and Far North participated. In football, Cresas de Garoua came away winners after defeating Central Region 2 - 1 in the final. Aboubacar scored the first goal for his team off a pass from Baba Fidèle. Baba Fidèle then scored the second goal for his team. Onguéné scored in the second half for Central Province. The North Region finished first in total medals, winning 9 out of the 12 available medals. They won 2 gold, 4 silvers and 3 bronze medals. Finishing in second was the Far North Region with 2 medals, a gold and a bronze. The Central Province finished third with one gold medal. One of the medals won by the North was claimed by Daniel Foka. At the 2009 edition of the competition, football and athletics were both on the program. The Central Region won the football final after defeating Pere Monti Social Centre of Ambam 1 - 0 in the final. The only participants in the athletics competition were athletes from the Pere Monti social centre. The Games were held again in 2012.

Special Olympics Cameroon organized a national ID football week in November 2008 in Yaounde. This event was lead up in preparation the 2010 FIFA World Cup in South Africa, where Special Olympics organized "Football for Hope" to run parallel to the FIFA World Cup.
