= Cameroonian Sports Federation for the Visually Impaired =

National sports federation in Cameroon

- Founded: 1999
- Founder: Norbert Tsoungui
- Purpose: Sport, Disability
- Location: Yaounde, Cameroon
- Region served: Cameroon
- Key people: President Norbert Tsoungui
- Formerly called: Association Sportive des Aveugles et Malvoyants du Cameroun
- Member of International Blind Sports Association; Member of Cameroonian Paralympic Committee

Cameroonian Sports Federation for the Visually Impaired (FECASDEV) (French: Fédération camerounaise de sports pour déficients visuels (Fécasdev)) is the national sports federation for people with vision impairments. The organization is one of four member federations of the Cameroonian Paralympic Committee and is a member of the International Blind Sports Federation (IBSA).

The organization's history dates back to 1999, when they were founded as the Sportive Association of Blind and Partially Sighted of Cameroon. During 2010 and 2011, their status changed as they were formally recognized by law, with their status inside Cameroon's sporting infrastructure changing. They have been involved with organizing goalball and blind football competitions in Cameroon.

== Governance ==
FECASDEV is one of four member organizations of the Cameroonian Paralympic Committee. Their President is Norbert Tsoungui. In 2014, the Secretary General was Jean Dieudonné Ntouda Odi. Gnete Irenaeus has served as the National Assistant Treasurer. The organization is based in Yaoundé. They do not have a website. FECASDEV is a member of the International Blind Sports Federation (IBSA).

Club for the Blind Youth of Cameroon (CJARC) (Note: The name of the club in French is, Club des jeunes aveugles réhabilités du Cameroun.) has been heavily involved with blind sport in Cameroon, dating back to the days of Cameroon Federation of Sports for the Handicapped (FECASH). (Note: The name of the organization in French is, Fédération camerounaise des sports pour handicapés.) It is one of the reasons CJARC has space at the headquarters of FECASDEV for things like holding their general meetings.

== History ==
The organization was founded in 1999 as Sportive Association of Blind and Partially Sighted of Cameroon (ASAMC). (Note: The name of the organization in French is, Association Sportive des Aveugles et Malvoyants du Cameroun.) The founder was Norbert Tsoungui, who was the first president of the organization. In 2011, ASAMC changed its name to Cameroonian Sports Federation for the Visually Impaired and the Disabled. Tsoungui continued on as president of the rebranded FECASDEV.

Articles 36 and 37 of Law Nº2010 / 002 of April 2010 protection and promotion of disabled persons (Note: The name of the law in French is, loi Nº2010/002 du avril 2010 portant protection et promotion des personnes handicapées.) saw the organization formally recognized by law in Cameroon. This was seen by the government as an important step in promoting physical activity for people with disabilities in the country. This legislation was followed up by Law No. 2011-18 of 15 July 2011 related to the organization and promotion of Physical and Sporting Activities. The law resulted in the dissolution of FECASH in July 2011. FECASH was replaced by FECASDEV, the Cameroonian Sports Federation for the Physically Disabled (FECASDEP), (Note: The name of the organization in French is, Fédération Camerounaise de Sports pour Déficients Physiques.) the Cameroonian Federation of Sports the Intellectually Disabled (FECASDI) (Note: The name of the organization in French is, Fédération Camerounaise de Sports pour Déficients Intellectuels.) and the Cameroonian Sports Federation for the Deaf (FECASSO). (Note: The name of the organization in French is, Fédération Camerounaise de Sports pour Sourds.) These four organizations were then made members of the newly reformed Cameroonian Paralympic Committee. The process that formally dissolved FECASH and saw the formal government recognition of this organization in that new context started in March 2011, building on the work from April 2010.

One of the major sources of funding for FECASDEV had been Fakkel 2000. Starting in the second half of 2011, Fakkel 2000 decided to refocus their strategy from all sport for the blind to non-competitive sport for blind children. As part of this change in strategy, they went through all their financial documents related to the various organizations they supported including FECASDEV starting around 2013. After finding irregularities, Fakkel 2000 contacted three leagues who Fakkel 2000 funds from FECASDEV should have gone to. These leagues reported not being paid or being paid less than they were owed, with irregularities totaling 515,000 XOF (USD$928.71). Despite Fakkel 2000 bringing these issues and other alleged theft concerns to FECASDEV's attention, FECASDEV allegedly did not pay back the money to Fakkel 2000 to address the irregularities or change their budget to reflect less promised funding from Fakkel 2000. Fakkel 2000 concluded in 2013 that as FECASDEV had always been about competitive sport, they were under pressure to keep their funding from Fekkal even if they were no longer eligible because of their own financial issues. In 2014, Fakkel 2000 suspended their financial support of FECASDEV. At the time of the suspension of funds, they had been providing the organization with an annual grant of 2,620,000 XOF (USD$4724.72).

In 2016, Tsoungui and CNPC President Jean Jacques Ndoudoumou were accused by members of Cameroon's national blind football team of making commitments on their behalf without consulting the team. The accusations were made as part of broader issues with the squad over lack of payment for their silver medal finish at the 2015 IBSA African Blind Football Championships.

== Competitions ==
FECASDEV has regularly organized a goalball leagues in the country, and supported a national clubs championship at the conclusion of the season. FECASDEV was involved with organizing the 2015 IBSA Blind Football African Championship in October of that year in Douala, assisted by the IBSA.
