= Health in Cameroon =

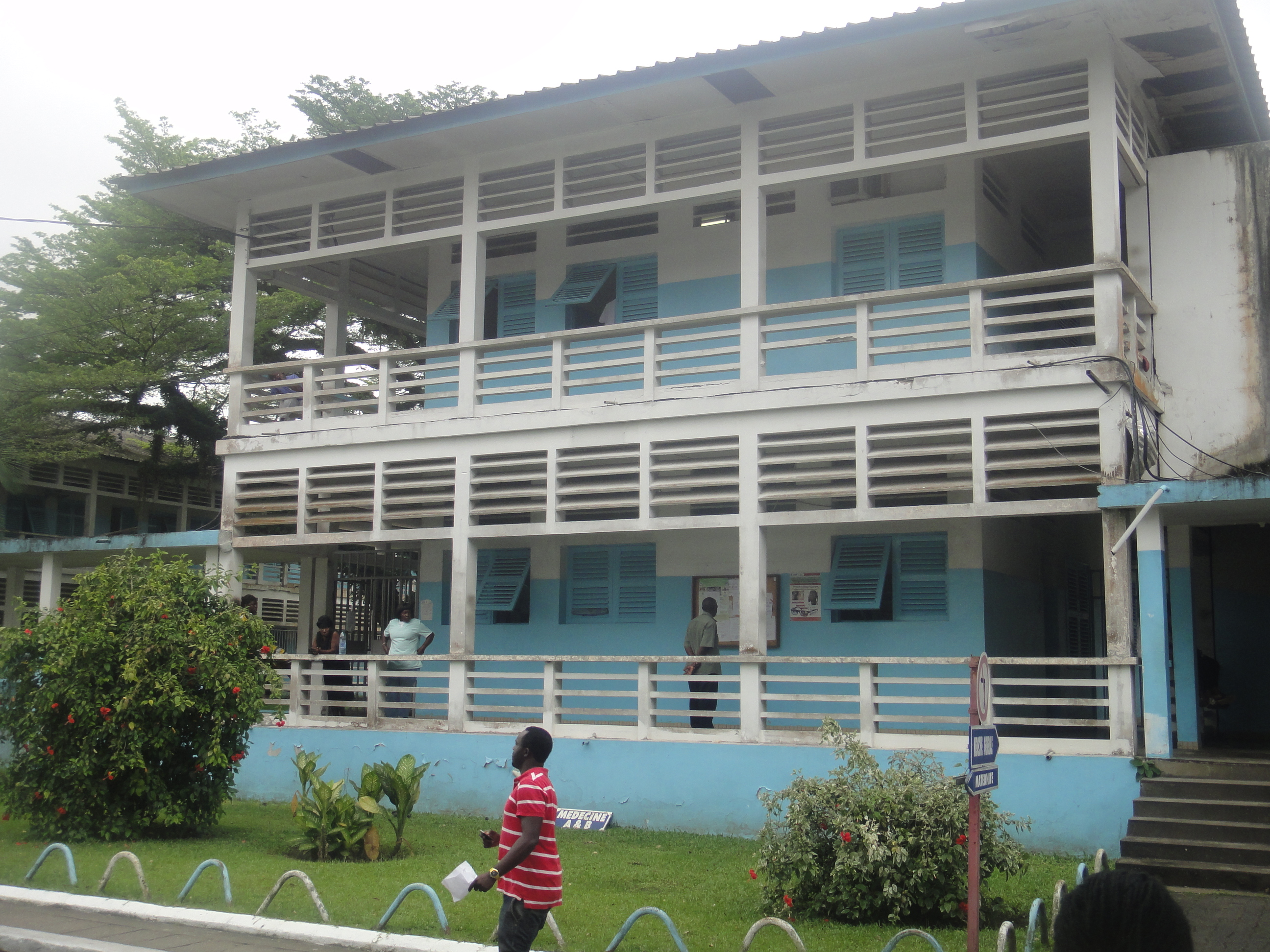
Laquintinie Hospital, Douala, Littoral Region

The Human Rights Measurement Initiative finds that Cameroon is fulfilling 61.0% of what it should be fulfilling for the right to health based on its level of income. When looking at the right to health with respect to children, Cameroon achieves 81.7% of what is expected based on its current income. In regards to the right to health amongst the adult population, the country achieves only 70.5% of what is expected based on the nation's level of income. Cameroon falls into the "very bad" category when evaluating the right to reproductive health because the nation is fulfilling only 30.9% of what the nation is expected to achieve based on the resources (income) it is available.

The advent of the COVID-19 pandemic brought more light to the deplorable healthcare system and saw the country venturing into Health technology.

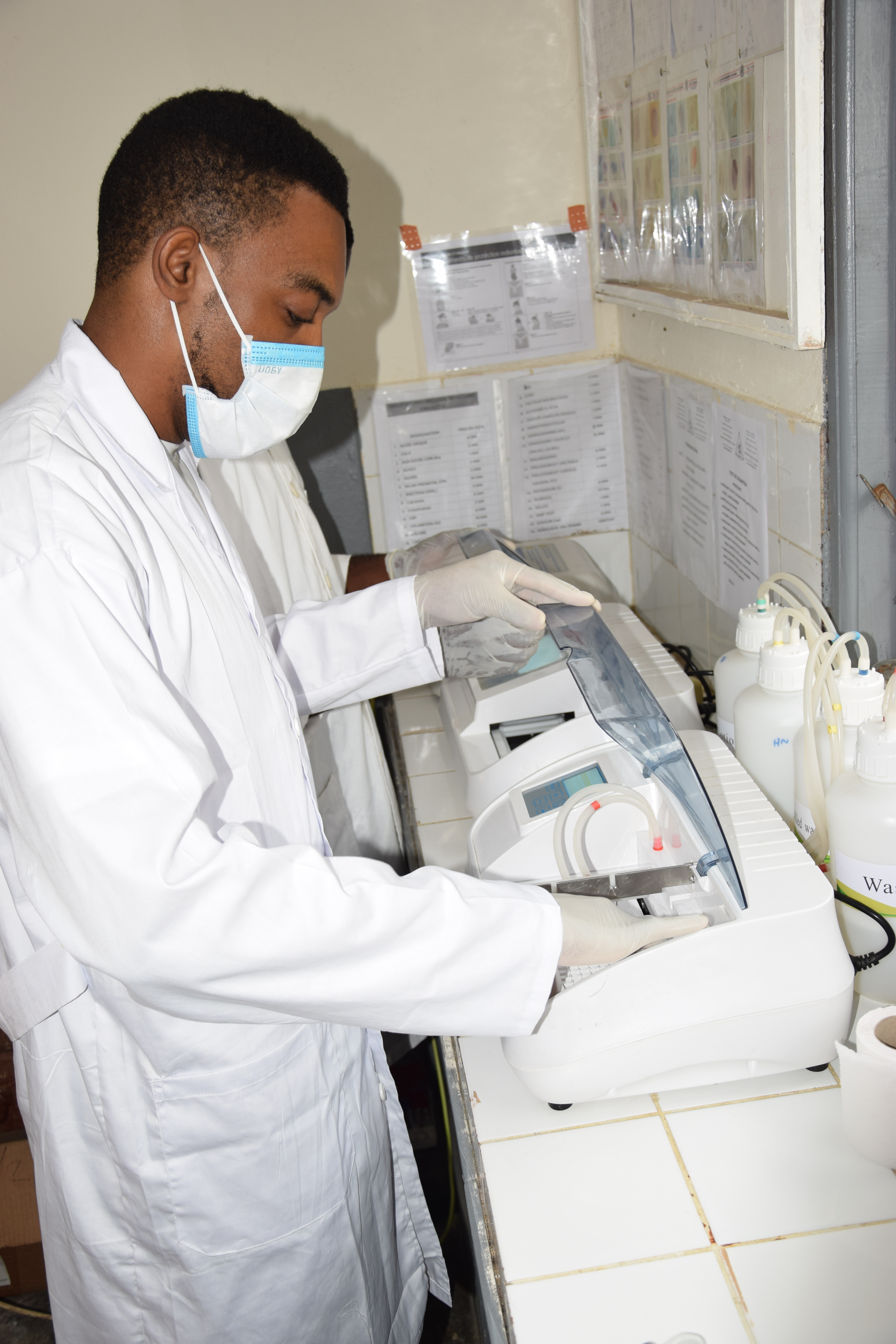
A laboratory in Cameroon, picture by John Mbenguè

There is also a shortage in professional medical staff, partially caused by public service hiring quotas. Therefore the staff that works is badly paid and has too much work to do, which makes it difficult to treat patients adequately. Many doctors and nurses which were trained in Cameroon emigrate to Europe – but also to South Africa and Asia – for that reason.

== Health infrastructure ==
As of 2016, Cameroon's health map illustrates 10 regions, 189 health districts, 1800 health areas and approximately 5166 public and private health facilities spread throughout the national territory. Access to health services in Cameroon in 2016 was at 2.19 health facilities per 10,000 inhabitants. The health facilities are organized into seven main categories: general hospitals, central hospitals, regional hospitals, district hospitals, district medical centers, Integrated health centers and ambulatory health centers.

== Health status ==
=== Demographics ===
- Population: 24,348,25 estimate for 2019
- Surface Area: 475,650 Square Km
- Population density: 51 inhabitants per square Km
- Young population: 48% of total population below 15 years and 3.5% aged 65 and above
- Annual growth rate: 2.6%

Life expectancy in Cameroon

=== Life expectancy ===
The 2014 CIA estimated average life expectancy in Cameroon was 57.35 years. However, in 2017, the estimates were 65.5 and 61.0 years for females and males respectively.

=== Birth rate and population ===
The population is estimated as 24,053,727 in 2017 and Central Bureau of Census and Population Studies gives an official projection of 24,348,251 in 2019.

There has been substantial increase from 2.3 million in 1900 through 4.34, 8.66, 11.7, 15.4, 20.1 millions in the years 1950, 1980, 1990, 2000, 2010 respectively.

=== Health Expenditure Profile ===
The per capita income of Cameroon in 2017 is $3,640, making it a low middle income country. The current Health economics (CHE) per capita has been on an increase in the last 20 years; US$43, 48, 54 and 64 in the years 2000, 2005, 2010, 2016 respectively though out-of-pocket spending has been the main source of payment for health services for majority of Cameroonians throughout this period. In 2016, of the health expenditure per capita of $64 spent, estimated that out-of-pocket spending accounted for 70% while domestic public spending, voluntary health insurance, aid accounted for 13%, 9% and 6% respectively and other sources just 2%.

=== Major causes of death ===
From 1990 till 2018 communicable, maternal, neonatal diseases as group is the leading causes of death followed by non-communicable diseases and injuries in Cameroon and Sub-Saharan Africa. However, globally this is not the same pattern observed as the group of non-communicable diseases has been the leading cause of death followed by the group of communicable, maternal & neonatal diseases and thirdly the group of injuries in the last three decades. The top ten causes of death in 2018:

- Malaria
- HIV/AIDS
- Lower respiratory infections
- Neonatal disorder
- Diarrheal diseases
- Ischemic heart disease
- Stroke
- Tuberculosis
- Road injuries and
- Cirrhosis

=== HIV/AIDS ===
For decades, AIDS has been the leading killer disease in southern Africa, where 67 percent of the world's HIV patients live.

HIV/AIDS is the second cause of death in Cameroon in 2018 after malaria. Progress had been made in AIDS-related death and new infections in Cameroon; reduction in the number of deaths from 22,000 to 18,000 and the number of new infections from 36,000 to 23,000 between the years 2010 and 2018. In 2018, 540,000 people were living with HIV and the prevalence among adults (15–49 years) was 3.6%. Moreover, the incidence among all people of all ages in Cameroon is 1.02% in 2018. In Sub Saharan Africa, the incidence (new infections per 1,000 of population) among adults (15–49 years) declined from 3.39 in 2010, 2.49 in 2015 to 2.14 in 2017 and globally for adults it also declined from 0.44 to 0.40 between 2015 and 2017.

Many organizations have been partnering with the government of Cameroon via the ministry of public health (MINSANTE) to against this disease.

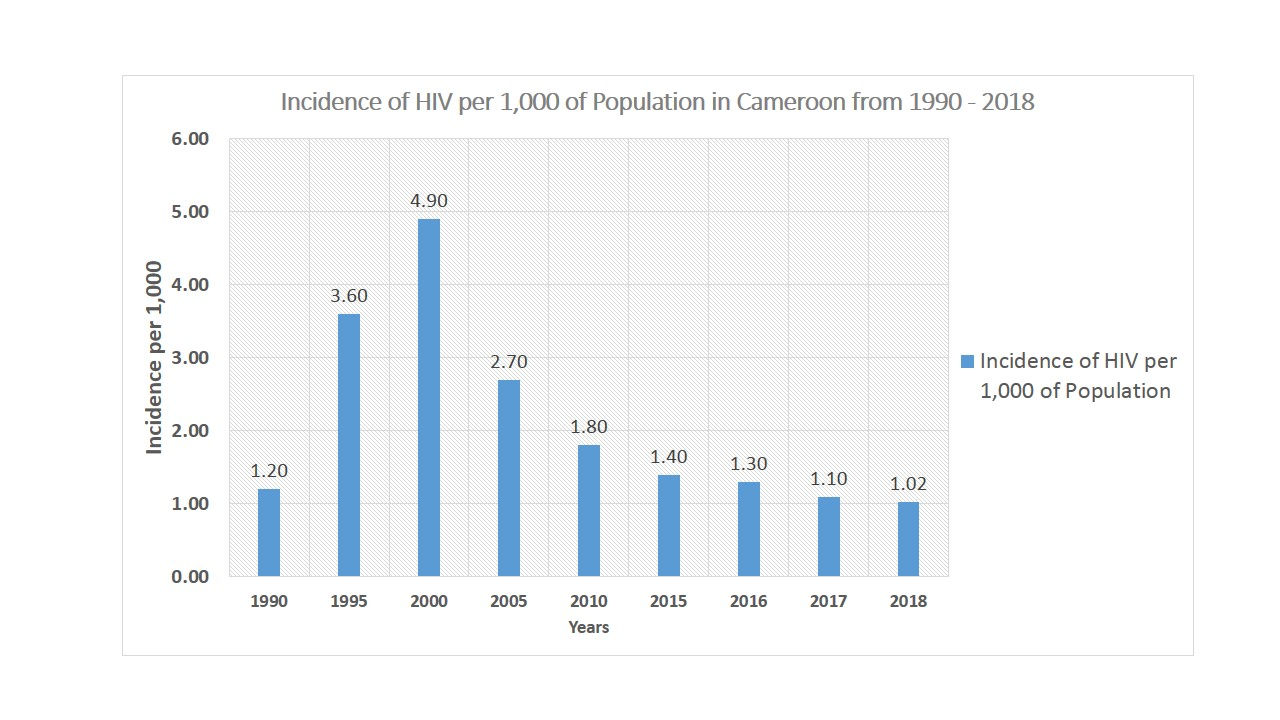
Incidence of HIV in Cameroon from 1990 to 2018

=== Maternal and child healthcare ===
The under 5 mortality rate, per 1,000 births is 155 and the neonatal mortality as a percentage of under 5's mortality is 24. In Cameroon the number of midwives per 1,000 live births is 0.2 and the lifetime risk of death for pregnant women 1 in 35.

As of 2017:

- Prevalence of child stunting: 30.7%
- Prevalence of child experiencing wasting: 2.8%
- Prevalence of child (2–4 years) overweight: 20.9%
- Coverage of seven vaccine in target population: 72.1%

==== Maternal mortality ratio ====
The maternal mortality ratio is defined as the number of women who die due to causes related to pregnancy or aggravated by pregnancy and provision of care with such deaths occurring during pregnancy or delivery or within 42 days after the end of pregnancy, whatever the duration or type of pregnancy, expressed per 100,000 live births for a given period. The maternal mortality ratio of Cameroon has shown decline in the last three decades. These deaths are however preventable with appropriate management and care. More efforts are needed so as to meet the global Sustainable Development Goals target of this indicator which is less than 70 per 100,000 lives births by 2030. In the world at large, it reduced significantly by almost half (44% reduction) from 385 in the year 1990 to 216 in the year 2015; as compared to Sub-Saharan Africa from 987 in 1990 from 546 in 2015.

Table 1: Maternal Mortality Ratio in Cameroon from 1990 to 2015

Years	Maternal Mortality Ratio
2015	596
2010	676
2005	729
2000	750
1995	749
1990	728

Source: World Health Organization, UNICEF, United Nations Population Fund and The World Bank, Trends in Maternal Mortality: 1990 to 2015, WHO, Geneva, 2015

Cameroon has a disproportionately high maternal mortality ratio, with approximately 600 deaths per 100,000 births and a perinatal mortality rate of 50 to 60 per 1,000 births, which is among the highest in the world. The primary causes of maternal death, such as hemorrhage, eclampsia, sepsis, obstructed labor, and pre-existing medical conditions, are consistent with those seen in other low-income countries. Similarly, sepsis, congenital malformations, fetal growth restriction, and preexisting complications account for the majority of perinatal mortality. Approximately 85% of pregnant women receive some form of antenatal care, a similar proportion benefit from skilled birth attendance. Furthermore, structural barriers to maternal healthare make the delivery of public health interventions to improve these rates challenging.

==== Coverage of skill birth attendants ====
In Cameroon, there has been a drop from 63.4% in 1990 to 56.8% in 2000 and then an increase to 67.9% in 2017. However, 81% of live births worldwide occurred with the assistance of a skilled health personnel in 2018, up from 62% in 2005 and 69% in 2012, whereas that of Sub-Saharan Africa was just 59% in 2018.

This increase in the coverage of live births by skilled birth attendants from the year 2000 in Cameroon could be attributed to the increase in the number of training institutions of health owned by the government, faith-based organization and also by private individuals; and also increase in the number of skilled health personnel employed in health facilities. Moreover, possibly because of the increase in mother and child health campaigns and demand to seek health this services in health facilities though traditional birth attendants are also present.

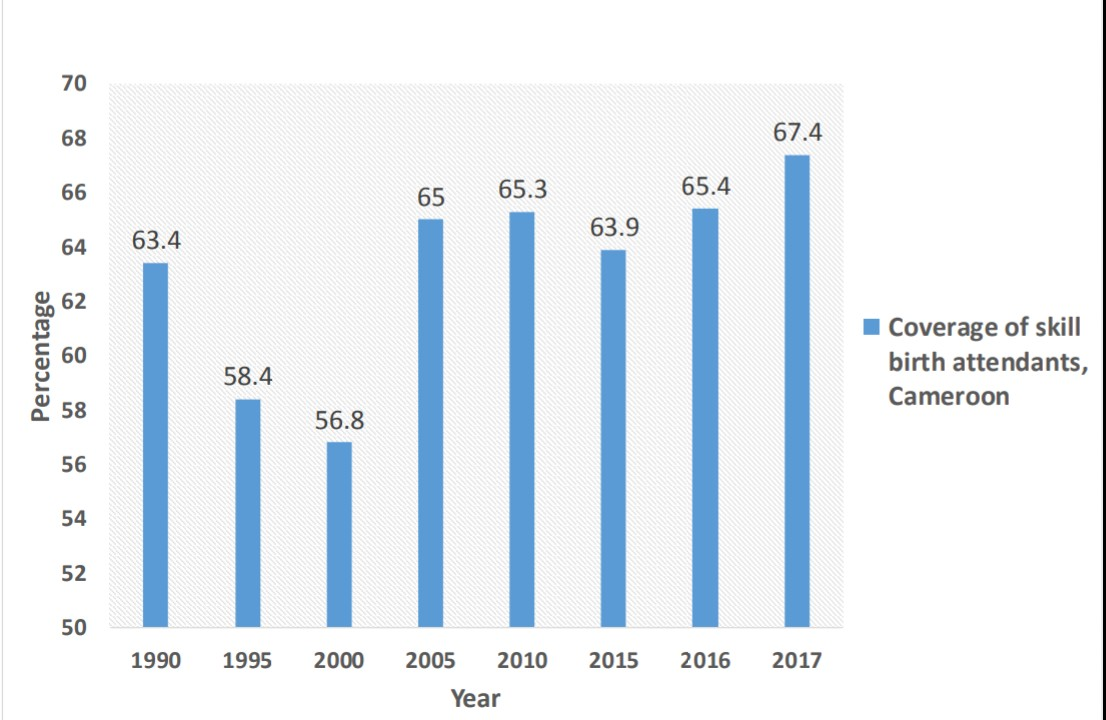
Coverage of skill birth attendants, Cameroon

==== Family planning needs met ====
The proportion women of reproductive age (15 to 49 years) in Cameroon who have their family planning needs met with modern contraception methods increased about three folds from 14% in 1990, to 43.1% in 2015. As of 2017, still not up to half of women of reproductive age have their family planning needs as met as the percentage stands at 44.7%. However, progress has been globally even though slowly from 74% in 2000 to 76% in 2019.

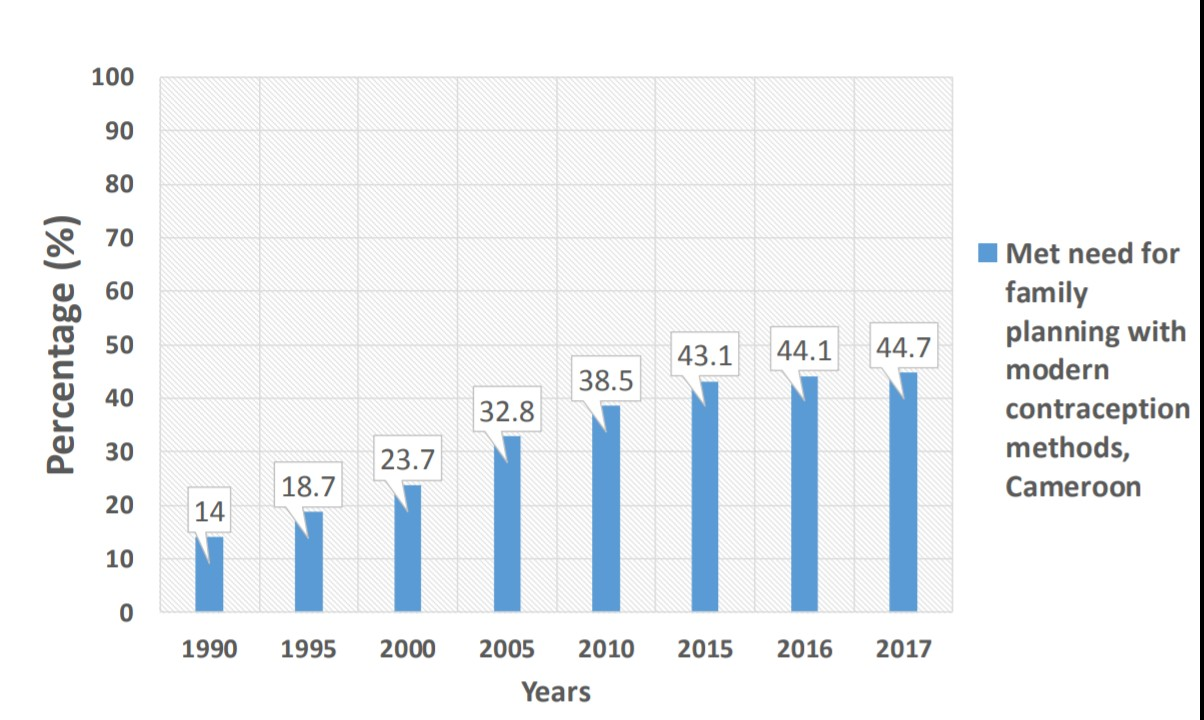
Met need for family planning with modern contraception methods, Cameroon

==== Under-5 mortality and neonatal mortality ====
Globally in the year 2000, the Under-5 mortality rate was 43 per 1,000 and neonatal mortality rate (likelihood of dying in the first 28 days of life) was 31 per 1,000. Also globally, in 2017, the Under-5 morality and neonatal rates stood as 39 and 18. As for Cameroon, the Under-5 and Neonatal mortality rates have shown a decline from 135.6 and 39.3 in 1990 to 73.5 and 23.4 in 2017 respectively. Many kids still die before getting celebrating their 5th birthday in Cameroon.

Table 2: Under-5 Mortality and Neonatal Mortality rates 1990–2017

Year	Under-5 Mortality Rate	Neonatal Mortality
2017	73.5	23.4
2016	77.5	24.3
2015	81.5	24.9
2010	103.0	28.1
2005	122.5	31.2
2000	134.2	32.9
1995	139.1	37.3
1990	135.6	39.3

=== Road injury ===
Transport injury is among the several types of injury. Pedestrian, cyclist, motorcyclist locally called "benskin" or "okada", motor vehicles, are among the most used road transport in Cameroon. As of 2014, the number of vehicles was estimated at 675,000. Recording more than 16,000 road accidents per year with more than 1000 deaths. In addition to the human loss which is dramatic, the economic loss is estimated at 100 billion FCFA (approximately US Dollars 168 million) per year. The estimated number of people killed per 100 million km driven was 73, which is more than 35 times higher than on similar roads in the US and Europe.

Road traffic injury is a major cause of death in Cameroon and among the top ten causes in 2018. The estimates of the deaths per 100,000 in the year 2017 from all transport injuries was 15.88 while road injury alone was 14.79 in Cameroon. Moreover, the deaths per 100,000 were 17.96 low income countries had as opposed to 10.39 in high income countries. In 2017 in Sub Saharan Africa, the number of deaths per from road traffic injuries were estimated at 161,648. Road traffic accidents are the largest cause of unintended injury in all regions, among low, middle income and high income countries. However, in developing countries, they have to deal with road accident in addition to some communicable diseases which are not a major issue in the high income countries. This numbers of deaths from transport injury for Cameroon have increase from 3391 to 4408 in the last two decades with increasing number of death recorded among he males population.

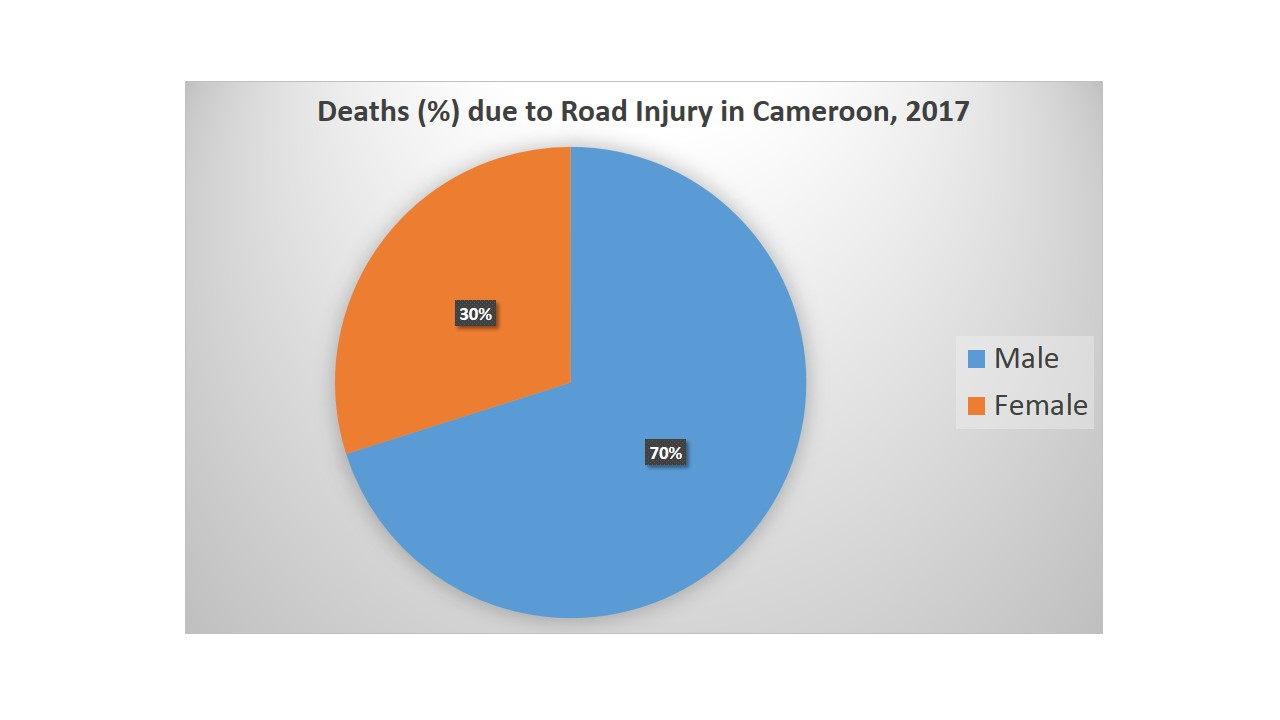
Percentage distribution by Sex of deaths due to Road Injury in Cameroon, 2017. Data from: https://vizhub.healthdata.org/gbd-compare/

These deaths could be as a result of several factors grouped into: transport operator (driver, cyclist, motorcyclist) factors, the state of the means of transport, the road or pavement, and also other environmental factors.

Distribution of the Death due to Road Injury in Cameroon, 2017 - Distribution by Age. Data from https://vizhub.healthdata.org/gbd-compare/

The Sustainable Development Goal number 3 (Ensure healthy lives and promote well-being for all ages) has nine major targets. The target number 6 which involves road injuries states:

- 3.6 By 2020 halve the number of global deaths and injury from road accident

Table 3: Number of deaths in Cameroon, Sub-Saharan Africa and the Globe from Traffic Injury (Road traffic Injury) 1990 - 2017

Year	Cameroon - Deaths from Transport Injury (Road Traffic Injury)	Sub-Saharan Region - Deaths from Transport Injury (Road Traffic Injury)	World - Deaths from Transport Injury (Road Traffic Injury)
2017	4408 (4108)	172,283 (161,647)	1,335,004 (1,243,068)
2016	4441 (4119)	170,780 (160,446)	1,345,442 (1,252,392)
2015	4317 (4074)	169,377 (159,036)	1,347,696 (1,252,514)
2010	4356 (4053)	167,183 (156,985)	1,394,717 (1,299,939)
2005	3484 (3484)	166,077 (155,417)	1,377,836 (1,284,407)
2000	3391 (3158)	162,369 (151,565)	1,376,105 (1,282,553)
1990	2680 (2535)	131,216 (124,172)	1,228,046 (1,150,717)

Reports: Road Safety: Cameroon must redouble its effort and strengthen coordination

In Cameroon, ministry of transport in collaboration with other ministries have been enforcing several methods to reduce this deaths in several sensitization campaigns (in schools, sending short messages to subscribers phones, special back to school programs), teams to do unannounced controls, alcohol test for drivers, improving on the high way signs, rehabilitation of road etc. However, she needs to redouble her effort and improve coordination, cooperation with as well as human behavior in order to greatly reduce not only the number of deaths but also the Disability-adjusted life year DALYs which stands at 226,673 (157,195 for men) road injury alone for Cameroon.

== United Nations: Sustainable Development Goals, 2016–2030 ==
Cameroon understands that the importance of the Sustainable Development Goals (SDGs) cannot be over emphasized as the program takes into consideration the problems of development in the dimensions of security, economy, social, human and the environment. Cameroon adopted all 17 SDGs but also understands that it will be demanding for her in reporting and also in achieving the objectives. Main challenges identified were:

- Inadequate mobilization of multiple stakeholders
- Strengthening of the Statistical System for better monitoring
- Mobilizing financial resources requested to achieve the SDGs

The SGDs are implemented in Cameroon against the backdrop of an update of development policies and strategies resulting in the facilitation of their integration. In addition, for the conclusion of an economic and financial program, with the International Monetary Fund (IMF), an interim development strategy has been prepared taking into account the contextualized SDGs. On security fronts, repeated attacks from the Boko Haram terrorist group in the Northern regions since 2014, flow of Central African refugees in the East region, and also the internal crisis in the North-West and South-West regions since 2017. These factors affect the mobilization of domestic funds which has negative impact on the achievement of SDGs. Some strides have been made in the implementation of the Agenda 2030 in the areas of education, economic growth, policies and institutions but the aforementioned factors and host of other factors threaten even the little gains achieved in these areas.

Key factors identified to the success of the implementation of the SDGs will be their inclusion in the budget; and the enhancement of the statistical mechanism for the follow-up of the progress.

Cameroon was part of the national voluntary review on the implementation of SDGs and the high level political forum on sustainable development New York in July 2019. The government has indicated that concrete actions and strategies are needed to:

- Intensify national ownership of the SDGs (inclusion in schools and university curricular and in extra-curricular activities)
- Accelerate full integration of SDGs into daily public policies and programs
- Establish a national multi-stakeholder monitoring body - as a review and accountability platform
- Strengthen of the national statistical systems
- Enlarge partnership and mobilize needed financial resources needed for the successful implementation of SDGs.
