= INAS Global Games =

Sports event for people with intellectual disabilities

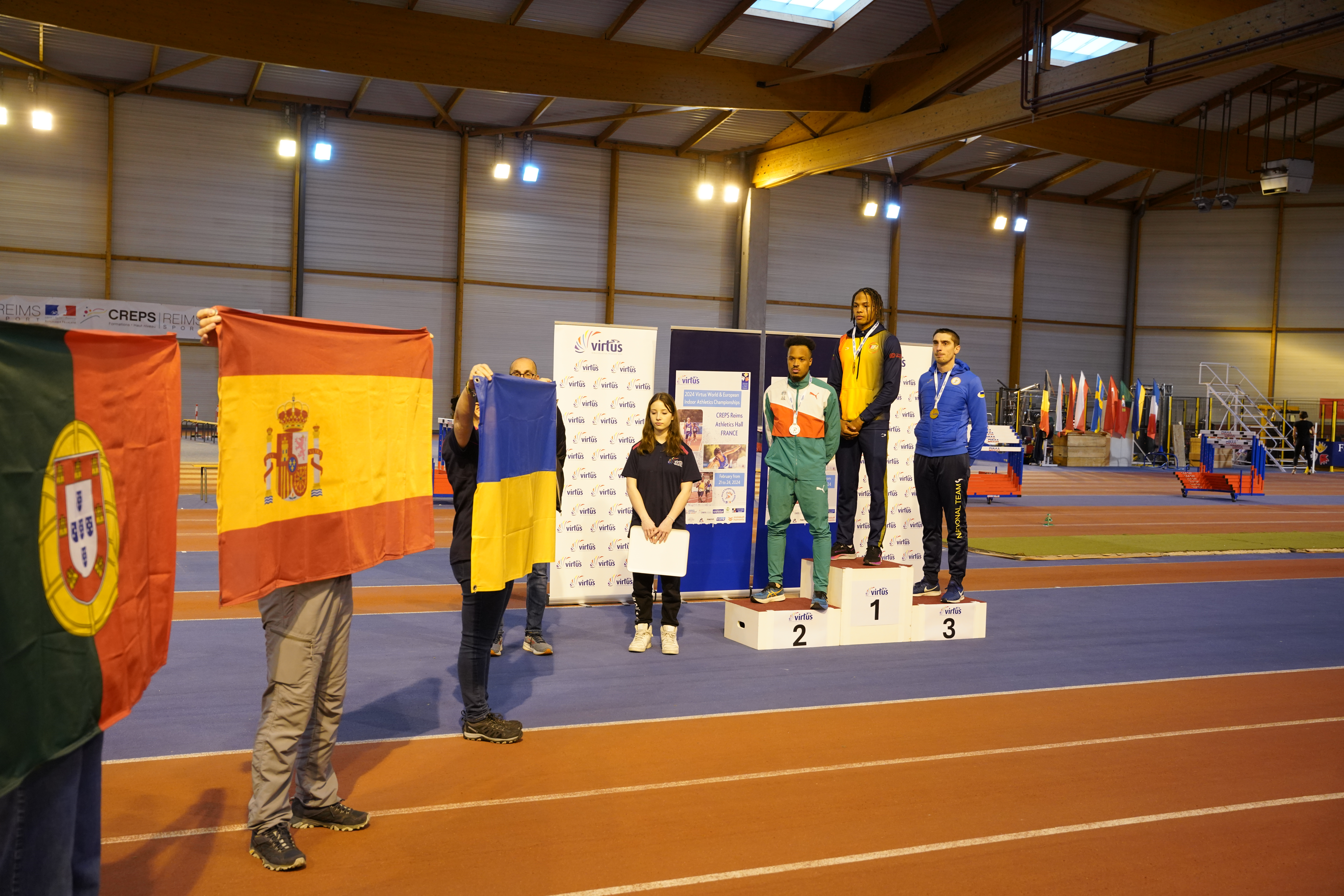
2024.

The INAS Global Games is a quadrennial global, international multi-sport event organised by the International Sports Federation for Persons with Intellectual Disability (INAS). First organised in 2004, it is intended for elite competition in disability sports for athletes with intellectual disability and, since 2017, autism and Down syndrome. It is the largest sporting event of its type. Athletes must have received classification from INAS to compete.

== History ==
A precursor event was the World Games for Athletes with an Intellectual Disability held in 1989. The competition was discontinued following the integration of athletes with intellectual disabilities into the Paralympics programme in 1996, though renewed exclusion following disability fabrication at the 2000 Summer Paralympics led to the relaunch as the INAS Global Games. The first three INAS Global Games were hosted in Europe. The fourth edition in 2015 expanded to South America, though INAS were forced to take over organisational duties due to the collapse of the local organising committee. Australia won the hosting rights for the 2019 event, having led the medal rankings of the previous three. Initially the competition was seen as a specialist event by other sports governing bodies, but the INAS athletics, swimming and table tennis competitions are now recognised and sanctioned by the main global bodies for those disability sports.

The games is separate from the INAS World Championships, which are a series of sport-specific championships.

== Editions ==
No.	Year	Dates	City	Country	Top Nation	Sports	Countries	Athletes
–	1989		Härnösand	Sweden				
1	2004	July	Bollnäs	Sweden	Poland	6	40	1000+
2	2009	7–11 June	Liberec	Czech Republic	Australia	9	34	800+
3	2011	26 September – 4 October	Loano	Italy	Australia	9	30	700+
4	2015	20–27 September	Various	Ecuador	Australia	8	35	600+
5	2019	12–19 October	Brisbane	Australia	Australia	11	50	814
6	2023	4–10 June	Vichy	France	France	13	80	1000+
7	2027	22 November–5 December	Cairo	Egypt				

=== Number of athletes at the 2019 Global Games (highest to lowest) ===
INAS	Country	Athletes
AUS	Australia	166
FRA	France	83
JPN	Japan	57
POL	Poland	36
ESP	Spain	34
RUS	Russia	33
POR	Portugal	31
THA	Thailand	26
ECU	Ecuador	25
GBR	Great Britain	24
HKG	Hong Kong	23
USA	United States	22
KOR	South Korea	21
EGY	Egypt	20
CHN	China	20
ITA	Italy	19
INA	Indonesia	18
CZE	Czech Republic	16
MEX	Mexico	15
BRA	Brazil	14
MAC	Macau	13
MAS	Malaysia	12
ISR	Israel	11
NZL	New Zealand	8
KSA	Saudi Arabia	8
IND	India	7
SIN	Singapore	7
COL	Colombia	5
EST	Estonia	5
SRI	Sri Lanka	5
ISL	Iceland	4
MRI	Mauritius	4
SWE	Sweden	4
TPE	Chinese Taipei	3
DEN	Denmark	3
BEL	Belgium	2
HUN	Hungary	2
CAN	Canada	1
CPV	Cape Verde	1
CHI	Chile	1
FRO	Faroe Islands	1
FIN	Finland	1
GER	Germany	1
NOR	Norway	1
TUR	Turkey	1
Total		814

=== All-time medal table (2004 to 2023) ===
Rank	Nation	Gold	Silver	Bronze	Total
1	Australia (AUS)	189	134	142	465
2	France (FRA)	121	89	83	293
3	Poland (POL)	71	56	53	180
4	Hong Kong (HKG)	64	64	57	185
5	Portugal (POR)	52	41	45	138
6	Spain (ESP)	49	41	35	125
7	Brazil (BRA)	46	33	25	104
8	Italy (ITA)	38	37	44	119
9	Japan (JPN)	35	62	68	165
10	Ukraine (UKR)	35	30	19	84
11	Russia (RUS)	34	13	9	56
12	Great Britain (GBR)	31	33	24	88
13	South Korea (KOR)	27	16	29	72
14	Ecuador (ECU)	19	16	15	50
15	Egypt (EGY)	17	6	14	37
16	Hungary (HUN)	16	29	29	74
17	Mexico (MEX)	16	9	14	39
18	Denmark (DEN)	15	8	5	28
19	South Africa (RSA)	14	18	34	66
20	Estonia (EST)	13	10	8	31
21	United States (USA)	12	25	20	57
22	Netherlands (NED)	11	13	14	38
23	Israel (ISR)	11	6	4	21
24	Sweden (SWE)	10	9	6	25
25	Czech Republic (CZE)	9	15	16	40
26	Colombia (COL)	9	2	4	15
27	Belgium (BEL)	7	6	6	19
28	Chinese Taipei (TPE)	7	5	6	18
29	Tunisia (TUN)	5	5	8	18
30	Iceland (ISL)	5	4	6	15
31	Venezuela (VEN)	4	6	6	16
32	Turkey (TUR)	3	4	4	11
33	Puerto Rico (PUR)	3	3	2	8
34	Cape Verde (CPV)	3	0	2	5
35	Croatia (CRO)	2	6	1	9
36	Indonesia (INA)	2	2	1	5
37	Canada (CAN)	2	1	4	7
38	Thailand (THA)	2	1	0	3
39	Faroe Islands (FAR)	1	5	2	8
40	Germany (GER)	1	3	1	5
41	Greece (GRE)	1	2	1	4
42	Finland (FIN)	1	1	1	3
43	Iran (IRI)	1	0	3	4
44	Malaysia (MAS)	1	0	2	3
45	Chile (CHI)	1	0	0	1
45	Peru (PER)	1	0	0	1
47	Kazakhstan (KAZ)	0	4	0	4
48	Macau (MAC)	0	3	4	7
49	Austria (AUT)	0	3	2	5
50	Singapore (SGP)	0	3	0	3
51	India (IND)	0	2	3	5
52	Argentina (ARG)	0	2	2	4
52	Sri Lanka (SRI)	0	2	2	4
54	Bulgaria (BUL)	0	2	1	3
55	New Zealand (NZL)	0	1	1	2
56	China (CHN)	0	0	1	1
56	Norway (NOR)	0	0	1	1
Totals (57 entries)		1,017	891	889	2,797

== Regional events ==
=== Virtus Americas Regional Games ===
No.	Year	Dates	City	Country	Top Nation	Sports	Countries	Athletes
–	2022 (cancelled)	18–23 September	São Paulo	Brazil	–	–	–	–
1	2026	2–11 October	Lima	Peru		10		

=== Virtus Oceania Asia Games ===
No.	Year	Dates	City	Country	Top Nation	Sports	Countries	Athletes
1	2022	5–11 November	Brisbane	Australia	Australia	11	24	600+

=== Virtus European Games ===
No.	Year	Dates	City	Country	Top Nation	Sports	Countries	Athletes
1	2018	14–22 July	Paris	France	Russia	9	20	1000
2	2022	16–23 July	Kraków	Poland		9	18	600

== Sports ==
- Athletics (2004 to present)
- Basketball (2004 to present)
- Cricket (demonstration sport in 2019)
- Cycling (2009 to present)
- Futsal (2004 to present)
- Judo (2009)
- Rowing (2009 to present)
- Swimming (2004 to present)
- Table tennis (2004 to present)
- Taekwondo (demonstration sport in 2015)
- Tennis (2004 to present)

== See also ==
- Special Olympics
- IWAS World Games
- Deaflympics
- Invictus Games

=== Other INAS sporting championships ===
- INAS World Athletics Championships
- INAS World Swimming Championships
