= 2015 IBSA World Games =

Competition of the International Blind Sports Federation

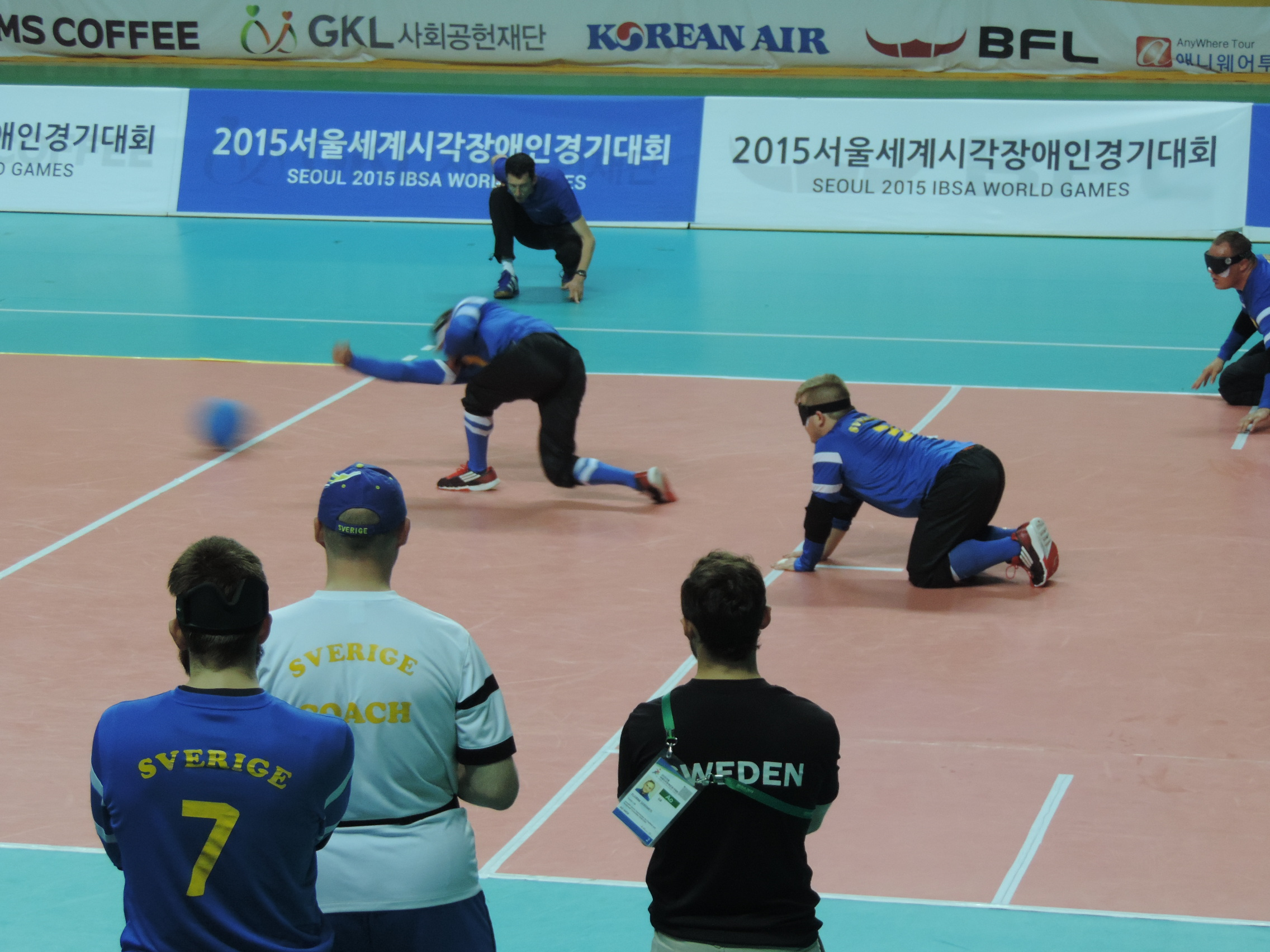
Sweden men's goalball team throwing against Turkey at the 2015 IBSA World Games in Seoul, South Korea.

The 2015 IBSA World Games was held from 8 to 18 June 2015, in Seoul, South Korea.

== Sports ==
It included competitions in ten sports:

- athletics, at the Incheon Munhak Stadium
- chess, at the Olympic Parktel Hotel
- futsal B1, at the Songpa women's football field
- Futsal B2/B3, at the SK Olympic Handball Gymnasium
- goalball, in the Jangchung Arena for the men's competition, and SK Handball Centre for the women's competition
- judo, at the Jamsil student gymnasium
- powerlifting, at the Woori Financial Art Hall
- showdown
- swimming, at the Tancheon swimming pool
- tandem cycling
- tenpin bowling, at the Tancheon bowling centre.

Venues were scattered around the city, including opening and closing ceremonies at the Jamsil Arena. About 1626 athletes competed from fifty-seven countries. The event motto was 'See with Passion, Run with Hope'. Mascots were Dari, Haechi and Suri.

== Medal table ==
* Host nation (South Korea)

2015 IBSA World Championships and Games medal table
| Rank | NOC | Gold | Silver | Bronze | Total |
|---|---|---|---|---|---|
| 1 | Russia (RUS) | 48 | 35 | 31 | 114 |
| 2 | Ukraine (UKR) | 16 | 11 | 11 | 38 |
| 3 | Iran (IRI) | 15 | 6 | 11 | 32 |
| 4 | China (CHN) | 9 | 15 | 9 | 33 |
| 5 | South Korea (KOR)* | 9 | 11 | 9 | 29 |
| 6 | Azerbaijan (AZE) | 8 | 6 | 3 | 17 |
| 7 | Turkey (TUR) | 5 | 6 | 12 | 23 |
| 8 | Uzbekistan (UZB) | 5 | 2 | 5 | 12 |
| 9 | Japan (JPN) | 4 | 12 | 7 | 23 |
| 10 | Chinese Taipei (TPE) | 4 | 4 | 2 | 10 |
| 11 | Algeria (ALG) | 4 | 1 | 2 | 7 |
| 12 | Mexico (MEX) | 3 | 8 | 5 | 16 |
| 13 | Thailand (THA) | 3 | 3 | 0 | 6 |
| 14 | Mozambique (MOZ) | 3 | 1 | 4 | 8 |
| 15 | Czech Republic (CZE) | 3 | 0 | 2 | 5 |
| 16 | Poland (POL) | 2 | 4 | 7 | 13 |
| 17 | Canada (CAN) | 1 | 2 | 2 | 5 |
| 17 | Finland (FIN) | 1 | 2 | 2 | 5 |
| 19 | Croatia (CRO) | 1 | 2 | 1 | 4 |
| 20 | Australia (AUS) | 1 | 1 | 4 | 6 |
| 21 | Malaysia (MAS) | 1 | 1 | 3 | 5 |
| 22 | Israel (ISR) | 1 | 1 | 2 | 4 |
| 23 | Bulgaria (BUL) | 1 | 1 | 1 | 3 |
| 24 | Hong Kong (HKG) | 1 | 0 | 2 | 3 |
| 25 | Georgia (GEO) | 1 | 0 | 1 | 2 |
| 25 | Germany (GER) | 1 | 0 | 1 | 2 |
| 25 | United States (USA) | 1 | 0 | 1 | 2 |
| 28 | Argentina (ARG) | 1 | 0 | 0 | 1 |
| 28 | Lithuania (LTU) | 1 | 0 | 0 | 1 |
| 28 | Netherlands (NED) | 1 | 0 | 0 | 1 |
| 31 | Venezuela (VEN) | 0 | 9 | 4 | 13 |
| 32 | Kazakhstan (KAZ) | 0 | 3 | 2 | 5 |
| 33 | Great Britain (GBR) | 0 | 3 | 1 | 4 |
| 34 | Italy (ITA) | 0 | 1 | 1 | 2 |
| 34 | Spain (ESP) | 0 | 1 | 1 | 2 |
| 36 | Belarus (BLR) | 0 | 1 | 0 | 1 |
| 36 | Mongolia (MGL) | 0 | 1 | 0 | 1 |
| 38 | Brazil (BRA) | 0 | 0 | 6 | 6 |
| 39 | Estonia (EST) | 0 | 0 | 2 | 2 |
| 39 | India (IND) | 0 | 0 | 2 | 2 |
| 41 | France (FRA) | 0 | 0 | 1 | 1 |
| 41 | Hungary (HUN) | 0 | 0 | 1 | 1 |
| 41 | Indonesia (INA) | 0 | 0 | 1 | 1 |
| 41 | Romania (ROU) | 0 | 0 | 1 | 1 |
| 41 | Sweden (SWE) | 0 | 0 | 1 | 1 |
| Totals (45 entries) | | 155 | 154 | 164 | 473 |
