= Jean Jacques Ndoudoumou =

Jean Jacques Ndoudoumou is a public servant and disability sports administrator from Cameroon. An albino, he faced discrimination growing up. He later became the General Director of the Cameroonian Regulatory Board for Public Procurement (ARMP) in 2001, leaving in 2012 after he was fired in the midst of a scandal.

Ndoudoumou is also a sports administrator, serving as the president of the Cameroonian Paralympic Committee. He was elected to the position in 2011, and continued to serve as president in 2016.

== Personal ==
From Zoetele, Ndoudoumou has albinism, and consequently had to deal with a lot of discrimination growing up. He is a traditional leader in Mvoutessi 1, and is also active in his local religious community.

== Public service ==
Ndoudoumou has over 57 years of experience in the public sector. He became the General Director of the Regulatory Board for Public Procurement (ARMP) (Note: The name of the organization in French is, Agence de régulation des marchés publics.) in 2001. Ndoudoumou had been accused of mismanagement while at ARMP before he was fired from his position in 2012 and ordered to pay back the government. He tried to ignore critics in his fight against corruption, and proclaimed his innocence of the charges of corruption that had been leveled against him. In May 2016, newspapers in Cameroon said that his arrest, related to his actions while at ARMP, was potentially imminent.

Ndoudoumou also served as the President of the Cameroon branch of the World Association for Advocacy and Solidarity of Albinos (ASMODISA). (Note: The name of the organization in French is, antenne du Cameroun de l'Association mondiale pour la défense des intérêts et la solidarité des albinos.)

== Sports administration ==
Ndoudoumou serves as the president of the Cameroonian Paralympic Committee. He has held this position since the organization was formally created on August 21, 2011. Ndoudoumou got the role following the elections for the position in August 2011, winning a four-year term after collecting 84 of the 87 available votes where he was the only candidate running. Ndoudoumou was part of the Cameroon delegation that went to Rio for the 2016 Summer Paralympics.
