= Cameroonian National Paralympic Committee =

National Paralympic Committee of Cameroon

National Paralympic Committee
- Country: Cameroon
- Code: CMR
- Created: August 21, 2011
- Recognized: International Paralympic Committee (IPC); Government of Cameroon
- Headquarters: Yaounde
- President: Jean Jacques Ndoudoumou
- Secretary General: Etienne Songa
- Website: cameroonparalympic.org

Cameroonian National Paralympic Committee (French: Comité national paralympique camerounais, CNPC) is the primary body in Cameroon for the promotion of sports for people with disabilities. It has four member organizations: Cameroonian Sports Federation for the Visually Impaired (FECASDEV), Cameroonian Sports Federation for the Physically Disabled (FECASDEP), Cameroonian Federation of Sports the Intellectually Disabled (FECASDI) and the Cameroonian Federation for Sports for the Deaf (FECASSO). The President of the Cameroonian Paralympic Committee is Jean Jacques Ndoudoumou. The organization has four vice presidents, who all serve as the presidents of CNPC's member organizations.

The CNPC's history dates to the early 2010s, following a period where the country's previous National Paralympic Committee (NPC) had poor relations with the government of Cameroon and the International Paralympic Committee (IPC). After the CNPC was formally created and recognized by law, the created a strategic plan and set about capacity building activities. The CNPC has some funding via grants and sponsorship. Future success for the CNPC is perceived by insiders as being dependent on government support for the Paralympic movement in Cameroon.

== Governance ==
The CNPC has four member organizations. These are Cameroonian Sports Federation for the Visually Impaired (FECASDEV), (Note: The name of the organization in French is, Fédération camerounaise de Football (Fécafoot).) the Cameroonian Sports Federation for the Physically Disabled (FECASDEP), (Note: The name of the organization in French is, Fédération Camerounaise de Sports pour Déficients Physiques.) Cameroonian Federation of Sports the Intellectually Disabled (FECASDI) (Note: The name of the organization in French is, Federation Camerounaise Des Sports Pour Deficients Intellectuals.) and the Cameroonian Sports Federation for the Deaf (FECASSO). (Note: The name of the organization in French is, Fédération Camerounaise de Sports pour Sourds.)

The President of the Cameroonian Paralympic Committee is Jean Jacques Ndoudoumou. Ndoudoumou has held this position since the organization was formally created on August 21, 2011. Prior to taking on this role, he was the General Director of the Agence de régulation des marchés publics (ARMP). He also served as the President of the Cameroon branch of the World Association for Advocacy and Solidarity of Albinos (ASMODISA). (Note: The name of the organization in French is, antenne du Cameroun de l'Association mondiale pour la défense des intérêts et la solidarité des albinos.) He got the role following the elections for the position in August 2011, winning a four-year term after collecting 84 of the 87 available votes where he was the only candidate running. Ndoudoumou had been accused of mismanagement while serving as the General Director of the Regulatory Board for Public Procurement (ARMP) (Note: The name of the organization in French is, Agence de régulation des marchés publics.) before he was fired from his position. Those same elections also saw Ebot Ntui become a Vice President. He had previously served as the ministre chargé de missions à la Présidence de la République. Etienne Songa has been CNPC's Secretary General since 2009. In October 2014, Songa traveled to Brazzaville, Congo to give a presentation to the Congolese National Paralympic Committee (French: Comité national paralympique congolais).

The organization has four vice presidents, who all serve as the presidents of CNPC's member organizations. These vice-presidents include FECASDI's Jean-Marie Aléokol Mabiemé, FECASDEP's Herve Guy Ngoyo Ngon, FECASDEV's Norbert Tsoungui and FECASSO's Pierre Valery Pemha. Other officers and key organizational personnel include Vice President Ogork Ntui Obot, Chief Financial Officer Christophe Ampoam, Deputy Secretary General Nazaire Ubalt Olinga, Deputy Financial Officer Jules Benjamin Mateck Ma Bilolo’o, Athlete Representative Constance Nchifi and Coach Representative Martin Luther Adibita.

The organization's mission is to develop partnerships and mobilize resources in Cameroon to support the country's para-sportspeople. They have a vision of developing para-sports in Cameroon to assist in creating a society that is more inclusive and equitable for people with disabilities. They are supposed to be apolitical in all their dealings. The organization is headquartered in Yaounde.

== History ==
Prior to the creation of the CNPC, the NPC for Cameroon was the Cameroonian Sports Federation for People with Disabilities (FECASH). The Federation had a number of issues including lack of organizational status, potentially not being recognized by the Cameroonian government and by the IPC, and claims of several NPCs all claiming to represent Cameroon being in existence. Cameroon's NPC had also been repeatedly suspended by the IPC as a result of problems related to the Ministry of Sports and the CNPC, with the IPC recognizing the CNPC but the Government of Cameroon not recognizing the CNPC as the country's NPC, and because the NPC had failed to pay IPC membership fees. One suspension occurred in 2003, and another from 2005 that included 2008, 2009 and 2010.

Law No. 2011-18 of 15 July 2011 related to the organization and promotion of Physical and Sporting Activities created by force of law the government recognized Cameroonian National Paralympic Committee, addressing earlier issues related to lack of government recognition of a National Paralympic Committee. FECASH had been dissolved by the same law. The law recognized and made FECASDEV, FECASDEP, FECASDI and FECASSO as four member federations of the CNPC.

Following the formal legislative creation of the CNPC in 2011, the organization and its four new member organizations had 30 days to hold elections for the boards of these organizations. Candidates to head the CNPC were already known prior to the election announcement, with FECASH Chairman Abeng Mbozo'o having bowed out of contention before then. The process leading to the CNPC's creation began in March 2011. The organization changed their name to "Comité National Paralympique Camerounais (CNPC)" on August 21, 2011. The name change and changes in the law signaled major change in the organization. In December 2011 in Beijing, the CNPC participated in their first IPC Congress. The changes normalized the CNPC's relationship with the International Paralympic Committee, and the country's athletes were then eligible to compete in some competitions because of the Paralympic Solidarity program.

The CNPC developed a strategic plan for period of 2013 to 2016. This plan was designed to prepare the country for the 2016 Summer Paralympics. It had seven major objectives. These included improving organizational structure, developing human and institutional resources, sustaining and improving para-sports physical infrastructure and sporting equipment, increase awareness of para-sports, creating athlete development pathways, and ensure Cameroonian participation in national and international events.

The NPC had their first website in 2012 as part of efforts by the International Paralympic Committee to increase the digital presence for its member nations. This website was designed with the goal of providing information for sportspeople on the local level all the way up to the elite level of Paralympic sport in Cameroon. The website was in French. In December 2012, the NPC participated in an athletics (track and field) training seminar organized by the IPC in Dakar, Senegal for French speaking African countries. Jean-Marie Aléokol Mabiemé co-wrote a guide called, "Guide du Sport pour Personne vivant avec un Handicap". In 2014, he was a trainer at a CONFEJES event in Yaoundé organized by the Ministry of Sports and Physical Education and the Paralympic Committee of Cameroon. Twenty sports administrators from four Central African countries participated in the conference.

In 2014, the NPC hosted a capacity building workshop in coordination with the IPC Academy. Capacity building inside NPCs like Cameroon was part of the IPC's Strategic Plan to improve NPC capacity and efficiency in governance, management, leadership and sport promotion in member countries. Other countries that held similar workshops in 2013 and 2014 included Ghana, Cape Verde, Ethiopia, Haiti, Liberia, Puerto Rico, Serbia, Seychelles, and Vanuatu.

== Funding ==
One of the sources for funding of the disability sports movement in Cameroon has been Agitos Foundation grants. In 2014, the NPC received a grant to promote Paralympic Sport in the country. The NPC received a grant of €800 ahead of the Rio Games to promote Paralympic and para-sports before, during and after the Paralympic Games. This grant was part of the Organisational Capacity Programme (OCP). The money was used by Cameroon to host a come and try it event in July 2016, and used to get additional media coverage from radio and television news. In June 2016, the CNPC signed a sponsorship agreement with MACRON to provide the kit for the Cameroon team at the 2016 Summer Paralympics. The CNPC viewed this historic sponsorship deal as important towards the continued professionalization of Paralympic sport in Cameroon. Success going forward in the Paralympic movement is perceived by those involved with para-sports in Cameroon as being dependent on the government for continued and increased support.

== See also ==
- Cameroon at the Paralympics
- Para-athletics in Cameroon
