= International Virtus Sports Federation =

Global parasports organization

Virtus Sport (INAS)
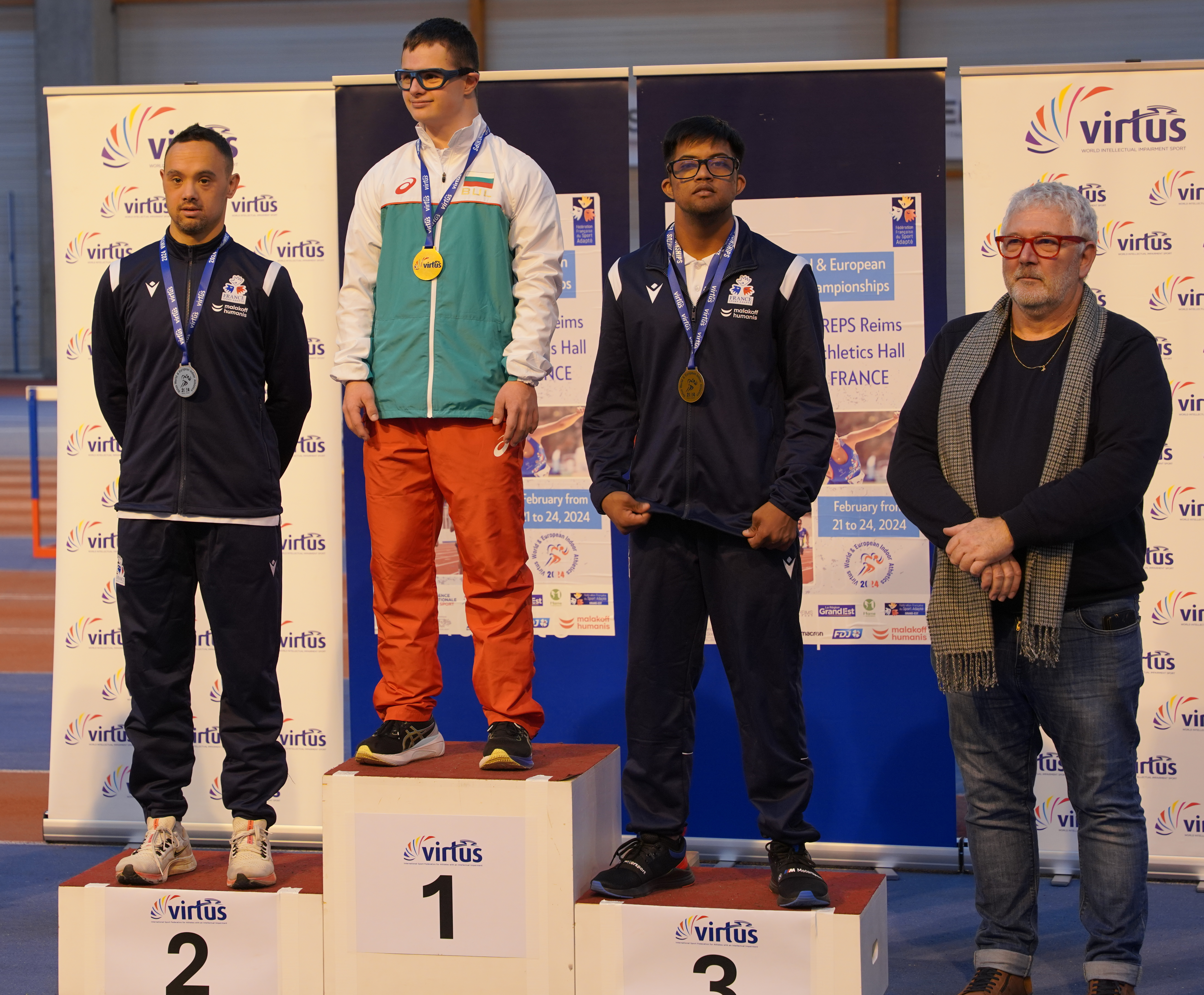
- Founded: 1986
- Type: Not-for-profit organisation for intellectual disability
- Purpose: Sport, disability
- Location: UK
- Region served: Worldwide
- Members: c. 500,000
- Key people: President – Marc Truffaut (France); Executive Director – Nick Parr (UK)
- Website: www.virtus.sport
- Formerly called: INAS-FID, INAS-FMH
- Member of International Paralympic Committee

Virtus Sport (formerly INAS or INAS Sport) (International Sports Federation for Persons with Intellectual Disability; originally called INAS-FMH, later INAS-FID, INAS and now as Virtus Sport) is a federation which was established in 1986 by professionals in the Netherlands who were involved in sport and wanted to promote the participation of athletes with mental handicap in elite sports (intellectual impairment).

The organisation uses the brand name Virtus to promote sport worldwide for athletes with intellectual disability, autism and Down syndrome.

It provides competition opportunities for elite athletes with an intellectual disability in Paralympic and non-Paralympic sports and is different from Special Olympics, which provides non-elite opportunities worldwide.

== Names ==
1. INAS-FMH – 1986–1994
2. INAS-FID – International Sports Federation for Persons with an Intellectual Disability (INAS-FID): 1994–?
3. INAS – International Sports Federation for Persons with Intellectual Disability: ?–2019
4. Virtus Sport – 2019–present

== History ==
The founding meeting of the first Executive Committee took place in January 1986 and after which the organisation became a member of the ICC– the International Coordinating Committee– the organisation that later became the International Paralympic Committee.

INAS' original membership was 14 nations which has grown into around 80 nations today.

In 1989, the 1st World Games for Athletes with an Intellectual Disability were held in Harnosand, Sweden and in 1992, immediately after the Barcelona Paralympic Games, the first Paralympic Games for 'Persons with mental handicap' were held in Madrid.

In 1994, INAS-FMH became INAS-FID – the 'International Sports Federation for Persons with Intellectual Disability' and in 1996, for the first time, a small programme of events for athletes with an intellectual disability was included in the Paralympic Games in Atlanta.

A larger programme including athletics, swimming and basketball was included in the Sydney Paralympic Games in 2000, but it soon emerged that a small number of athletes had cheated the system of determining eligibility, resulting in the suspension of events – a suspension that was to remain in place until 2012.

Despite exclusion from the Paralympic Games, the INAS sport programme continued to grow considerably to incorporate more than 10 sports whilst its membership grew to cover all 5 continents.

== Eligibility and classification ==
Athletes with an intellectual disability are characterised by an IQ of 75 or below, significant limitations in Adaptive Behaviour and the disability must be present before the age of 18. This is based on the American Association for Intellectual and Developmental Disability's definition of intellectual disability.

== Recognized sports ==
Sports:

=== Core sports ===
1. Athletics
2. Basketball
3. Cricket
4. Cycling
5. Equestrian
6. Football/futsal
7. Judo
8. Rowing
9. Skiing
10. Swimming
11. Table tennis
12. Tennis

=== Partnerships with international federations ===
1. Golf
2. Karate
3. Para-hockey
4. Sailing
5. Taekwondo

== Current activities ==
Today's sport programme includes some 15 annual events, and more than 4000 athletes are registered to compete at an international level, while thousands of people with an intellectual disability receive opportunities for sport through the work of member organisations.

Following a partnership between INAS and the International Paralympic Committee to overhaul the process of determining athlete eligibility, events for athletes with an intellectual disability were re-instated to the Paralympic programme by the IPC General Assembly in November 2009, in preparation for the London 2012 Paralympic Games.

In 2019, INAS was rebranded as Virtus.

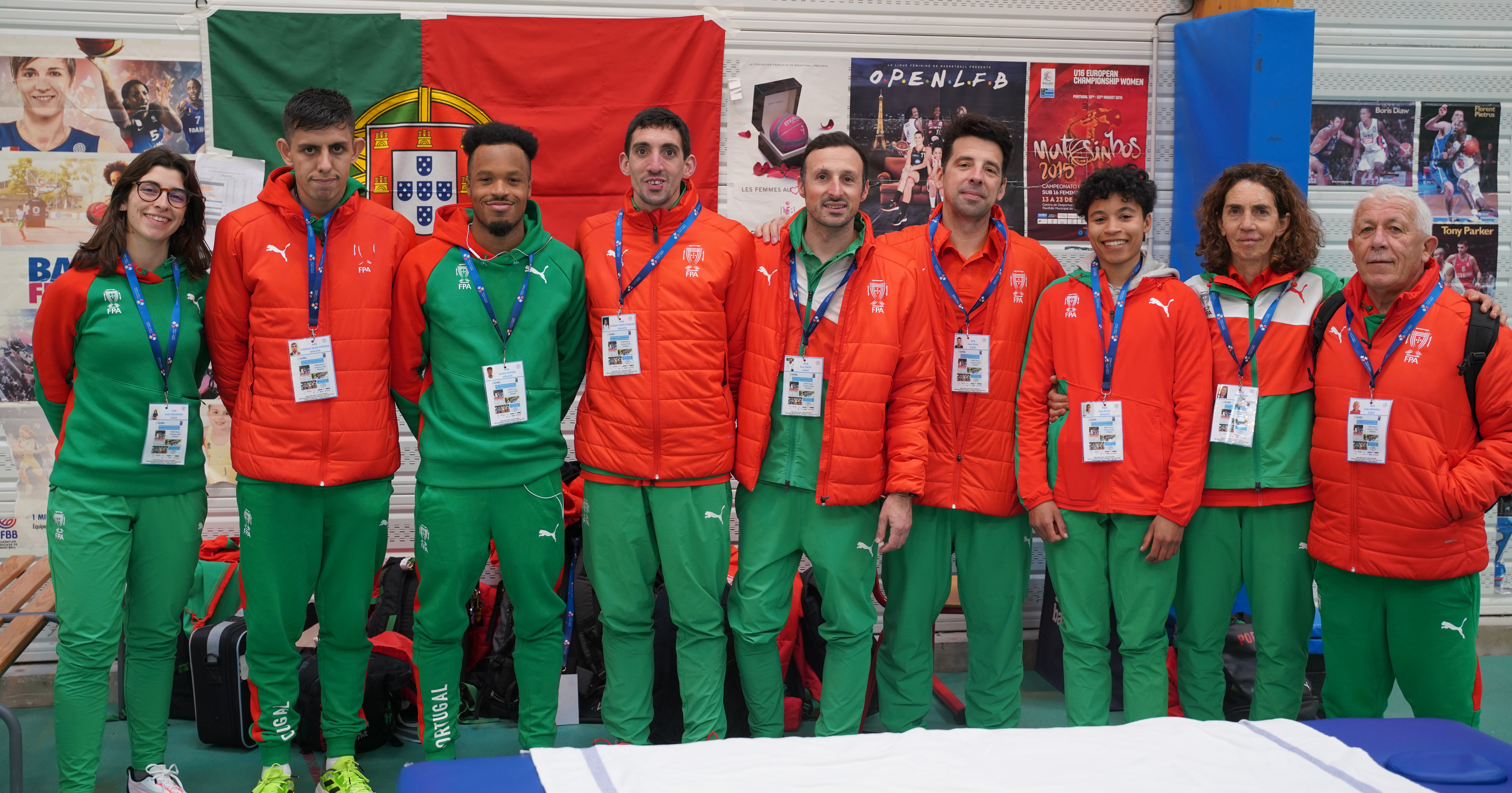
Team Portugal

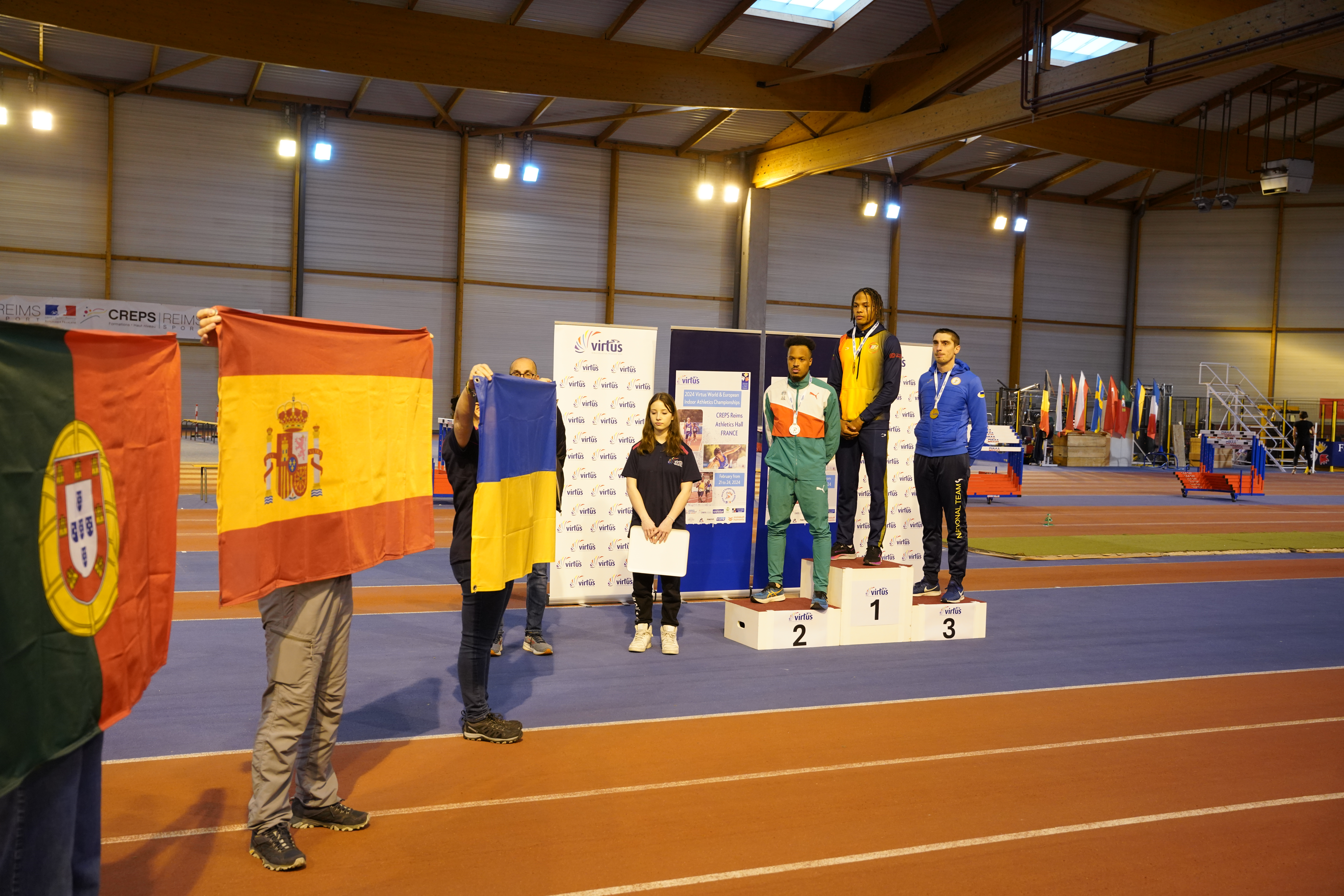
Podium, 2024

== Events ==
=== INAS World Championships ===
- Main article : INAS World Championships

Number	Event	First Edition	Last edition
Main sports
1	INAS World Athletics Championships (outdoor, indoor)	1989, 2001	10th (2017), 9th (2016)
2	INAS World Cross Country Championships	2002	9th (2017)
3	INAS World Half Marathon Championships	2006	8th (2018)
4	INAS World Swimming Championships	1989	6th (2017)
5	INAS World Cycling Championships	1999	10th (2018)
6	INAS World Rowing Championships (outdoor, indoor)	2014, 2009	2nd (2015), 4th (2015)
Team sports
8	INAS World Basketball Championships	1994	10th (2017)
9	INAS World Cricket Championships	2011	2nd (2015)
10	INAS World Football Championships	1994	7th (2018)
11	INAS World Futsal Championships	2012	2nd (2017)
12	INAS World Handball Championships	no yet	no yet
13	INAS World Hockey Championships (field hockey)	no yet	no yet
Winter sports
14	INAS World Ski Championships (alpine, Nordic)	2009	9th (2017)
Other sports
15	INAS World Equestrian Championships	2017	1st (2017)
16	INAS World Table Tennis Championships	1995	7th (2017)
17	INAS World Tennis Championships	2004	7th (2018)

Note : INAS does not organise events in Taekwondo but work in partnership with World Taekwondo World Para Taekwondo Championships.

- Source :
- "Results Database « Inas". Archived from the original on 23 September 2015.

=== INAS Global Games ===
- Main article : INAS Global Games

In 2004 INAS launched a new multi-sport competition INAS Global Games (INAS World Games / Intellectual Disability Global Games). The first event took place in Bollnäs, Sweden and featured more than 1000 athletes. The second Global Games took place in Czech Republic in 2009. With the re-inclusion of athletes with an intellectual disability into Paralympic competition, it was decided to move the Global Games to the year preceding the Paralympics. The next Global Games therefore took place in 2011. After a bidding procedure, Italy was chosen as the host nation. The 2015 Global Games took place in Guayaquil, Ecuador, in September. The 2019 INAS Global Games took place in Brisbane, Queensland Australia. The 2023 Virtus Global Games took place in Vichy, France.

No.	Year	Dates	City and host country	Champion	Sports	Events	Countries
1	2004	July	Bollnäs, Sweden	Poland	6		40
2	2009	7–11 June	Liberec, Czech Republic	Australia	9		34
3	2011	26 September – 4 October	Loano, Italy	Australia	9		30
4	2015	20–27 September	Quito, Ecuador	Australia	8		35
5	2019	12–19 October	Brisbane, Australia	Australia	11		
6	2023	4–10 June	Vichy, France	France	13		47
7	2027						

== Regional Games ==
=== European Championships ===
Members (28 nations in 2019):

Sports:

1. Athletics:
2. Swimming:
3. Futsal/Football:
4. Basketball:
5. Handball:
6. Table Tennis:
7. Other Sports (Cycling, Rowing, Judo, Skiing, Tennis, Equestrian):

=== INAS European Games ===
No.	Year	Dates	City and host country	Champion	Sports	Events	Countries
1	2018	14–22 July	Paris, France		7 + 2		TBD
2	2022		Krakow, Poland				TBD
3	2026						

Results of the 2018 European Championship:

Country	Position
Italy	Champion (1st Title)
Portugal	Runner-up
Spain	Third place

The 1st European Winter Games (skiing, rowing, futsal, basketball 3x3) took place in Zakopane, Poland from 2 – 8 March 2024.

=== INAS Asia-Pacific Games ===
1. 2022 Australia
2. 2026

The 1st Virtus Oceania Asia Games 2022 took place in Australia from 5–11 November 2022.

Sports:

1. Athletics – Paralympic Pathway
2. Badminton – Demonstration Sport
3. Basketball
4. Cycling – Track & Road Cycling
5. Judo
6. Rowing – On-Water & Indoor Rowing
7. Sailing – Para Sailing International Championship
8. Swimming – Paralympic Pathway
9. Table Tennis – Paralympic Pathway
10. Taekwondo
11. Triathlon – Demonstration Sport

20 countries took part in the event:

- Australia
- Brazil
- Colombia
- Ecuador
- Fiji
- France (including Wallis & Futuna, New Caledonia)
- Hong Kong
- India
- Indonesia
- Islamic Republic of Iran
- Japan
- Macau
- Malaysia
- Maldives
- New Zealand
- Republic of Palau
- Papua New Guinea
- Philippines
- Republic of Korea
- Singapore
- Chinese Taipei
- Thailand
- Great Britain
- United States of America

Events:

- Athletics
- Basketball
- Cycling
- Equestrian
- Futsal
- Handball
- Judo
- Karate
- Rowing
- Swimming
- Table Tennis
- Taekwondo
- Tennis

Medals:

Rank	Nation	Gold	Silver	Bronze	Total
1	Australia	94	83	43	220
2	Japan	25	13	15	53
3	Hong Kong	9	17	7	33
4	Iran	4	2	2	8
5	India	4	0	3	7
6	South Korea	3	0	3	6
7	Malaysia	2	2	3	7
8	Chinese Taipei	1	5	5	11
9	Singapore	1	3	0	4
10	Indonesia	1	2	8	11
11	New Zealand	1	2	7	10
12	Philippines	1	2	0	3
13	Fiji	0	1	2	3
14	Macau	0	0	1	1
14	Thailand	0	0	1	1
Totals (15 entries)		146	132	100	378

In the event, Solomon Islands received one silver while the Republic of Palau received no medals.

=== INAS Pan American Games ===
The 2026 Virtus Americas Regional Games are scheduled to take place in Peru.

== See also ==
- Special Olympics
- International Blind Sports Federation
- International Committee of Sports for the Deaf
- World Abilitysport
- International Wheelchair and Amputee Sports Federation (IWAS)
- Cerebral Palsy International Sports and Recreation Association (CPISRA)
- International Sports Federation of the Disabled (ISOD)
- International Stoke Mandeville Games Federation (ISMGF)
- International Sports Federation of the Disabled (ISOD)
