= Cameroonian Sports Federation for the Physically Disabled =

National sports federation in Cameroon

Fédération Camerounaise de Sports pour Déficients Physiques
- Founded: August 2011
- Purpose: Sport, Disability
- Location: Yaounde, Cameroon
- Origins: Founded following the dissolution of Fédération camerounaise des sports pour personnes handicapées
- Region served: Cameroon
- Key people: President: Herve Guy Ngoyo Ngon

Cameroonian Sports Federation for the Physically Disabled (FECASDEP) (French: Fédération Camerounaise de Sports pour Déficients Physiques) is the national sports federation for people with physical disabilities.

== Governance ==
FECASDEP is one of four member organizations of the Cameroonian Paralympic Committee (CNPC). The President is Herve Guy Ngoyo Ngon. In this role, he also serves as a Vice President of CNPC.

The federation is responsible for national team selection in internationals para-sports competitions that include people with physical disabilities.

== History ==
Articles 36 and 37 of "loi Nº2010/002 du avril 2010 portant protection et promotion des personnes handicapées" saw the organization formally recognized by law in Cameroon. This was seen by the government as an important step in promoting physical activity for people with disabilities in the country.

Fédération camerounaise des sports pour handicapés (FECASH) was dissolved in July 2011 as a result of Law No. 2011-18 of 15 July 2011 related to the organization and promotion of Physical and Sporting Activities. It was replaced by Fédération Camerounaise de Sports pour Déficients Physiques (FECASDEP), Fédération Camerounaise de Sports pour Déficients Visuels (FECASDEV), Fédération Camerounaise de Sports pour Déficients Intellectuels (FECASDI) and Fédération Camerounaise de Sports pour Sourds (FECASSO). These four organizations were thane made members of the newly reformed Cameroonian Paralympic Committee. The process that dissolved FECASH and saw the formal creation of this organization began in March 2011.

FECASDEP was given funding to send 4 sportspeople to the 2011 All-Africa Games to compete in javelin and the 1,500 meters. FECASDEP held a two-week training camp ahead of the competition, and had a goal of having its athletes make the podium at the Games.
