= Jean-Marie Aléokol Mabiemé =

Cameroonian politician

Jean-Marie Aléokol Mabiemé is a Cameroonian political figure and disability sports administrator.

As a disability sports administrator, Aléokol has served a number of roles including President of Cameroonian Federation of Sports the Intellectually Disabled, lecturer at the National Institute of Youth and Sports (INJS), member of the Ethics Committee of the National Olympic and Sports Committee of Cameroon (CNOSC), director of "Football for Hope", Vice-President of Handicap Sports Federation of Cameroon, and Vice President of African Francophone Games for the Handicapped. He is dead

== Government ==
In 2004, Aléokol was appointed as the Secretary of State to the Minister of Defense. This position put him in charge of the National Gendarmerie. In 2013, he was appointed as a senator in Cameroon's Parliament by the country's head of state for the Eastern Region.

== Sports administration ==
Aléokol serves as the President of Cameroonian Federation of Sports the Intellectually Disabled (FECASDI). (Note: The name of the organization in French is, Federation Camerounaise Des Sports Pour Deficients Intellectuals(Fecasdi).) In May 2014, FECASDI hosted an Agitos Foundation funded International Sports Federation for Persons with Intellectual Disability (INAS) workshop that sought to increase participation of African countries in intellectual disability sports on the international level. Aléokol served as one of the local event organizers. Cameroon was supposed to send a delegation to the 2014 INAS World Indoor Athletics Championships that took place from February 28 to March 2 in Reims, France. Aléokol was supposed to be part of the delegation that accompanied the athletes to France, but the team was unable to travel as they could not get visas. In his role as President, he also worked on organizing the 2016 African Open International Futsal Tournament.

Aléokol is also a lecturer at the National Institute of Youth and Sports (INJS) (Note: The name of the organization in French is, Institut National de la Jeunesse et des Sports.) in Yaoundé. In 2016, he was serving as a member of the Ethics Committee of the National Olympic and Sports Committee of Cameroon (CNOSC). (Note: The name of the organization in French is, comité d'éthique du Comité national olympique et sportif du Cameroun (Cnosc).)

In 2007, Aléokol was the director of "Football for Hope". Serving in this role, he launched a two-year program in 2007 to teach 250 people with intellectual disabilities about football. The program was supported by Cameroonian Football Federation. (Note: The name of the organization in French is, Fédération camerounaise de Football (Fécafoot).) In establishing this program, Aléokol hoped to have enough players ready to potentially compete in the 2010 ID Football World Championships. In 2008, Aléokol served as the Technical Director of the Club Paralympic Cameroon. (Note: The name of the organization in French is, Club paralympique camerounai.) That year, he was also the Vice-President of Handicap Sports Federation of Cameroon.

Ahead of the 2012 Summer Paralympics, he expressed concern over the lack of the number of classifiers in Cameroon. Inability to get sportspeople classified diminished the country's ability to send sportspeople abroad to compete and left them unprepared for major competitions like the Paralympic Games.

In 2013, FECASADI hosted a regional conference where issues about the development of ID sport in Africa were discussed. One of the major issues brought up by Aléokol and International Sports Federation for Persons with Intellectual Disability (INAS) Executive Director Nick Parr was that there were no ID athletes from Africa who competed at the 2012 Summer Paralympics in London.

Aléokol also served as the Vice President of African Francophone Games for the Handicapped, (Note: The name of the competition in French is, Jeux de l'Avenir des personnes handicapées d'Afrique francophone (JAPHAF).) where he was charged with managing the Central Africa region. Cameroon hosted the 2008 edition of the Games, with Aléokol serving point on the local organizing committee. When the Games had to be delayed as a result of a government decision, he was charged with informing the governments of participating countries of the delay. Cameroon hosted the 2011 Central African edition, with Aléokol serving as the Chairman of the Local Organizing Committee. In this role, he worked with the government and other stakeholders to insure the Games took place under adequate conditions.

Aléokol co-wrote a guide called, "Guide du Sport pour Personne vivant avec un Handicap". In 2014, he was a trainer at a CONFEJES event in Yaoundé organized by the Ministry of Sports and Physical Education and the Cameroonian Paralympic Committee. Twenty sports administrators from four Central African countries participated in the conference.
