= Art Jewelry Forum =

International non-profit organization

Art Jewelry Forum (AJF) is a nonprofit international organization founded in 1997 that advocates for the field of contemporary art jewelry through education, discourse, publications, grants, and awards.

AJF publishes online articles and print books covering historical pieces, theoretical interpretations, and exhibition reviews, and has produced several print publications in collaboration with publishers such as Lark Crafts. The organization has also organized and sponsored exhibitions, most notably Geography, which was shown at SOFA Chicago and at the Society of North American Goldsmiths conference in 2011.

AJF administers three grant categories: the Emerging Artist Award, an annual juried prize of US$7,500 for emerging wearable art jewelry makers; the Exhibition Award, which supports exhibitions and catalogs focused on art jewelry; and the Speakers and Writers Award, which supports individuals critically engaged in the field. The organization was founded by Susan Cummins, who also serves as director of the Rotasa Foundation.

== Publications ==
Art Jewelry Forum publishes online articles as well as in print books. AJF's online articles cover historical pieces and movements, theoretical interpretations of work, and exhibition reviews. Contributors for the online articles include staff writers as well as professionals in the field. Printed books from Art Jewelry Forum include Geography (exhibition catalog), AJF Best of Interviews, and Show and Tales. Art jewelry Forum also initiated and funded the publication of Contemporary Jewelry in Perspective by Lark Crafts.

The exhibition catalog Geography was Art Jewelry Forum's first publication in 2011. Geography was printed in conjunction with an exhibition of the same name that was presented at SOFA Chicago 2011 and at the Society of North American Goldsmiths conference in Seattle of 2011.

Art Jewelry Forum worked with Lark Crafts, a subsidiary of Sterling Publishing, in 2013 to publish Contemporary Jewelry in Perspective. Contemporary Jewelry in Perspective is broken into three sections "the first exploring what kind of thing contemporary jewelry is, the second exploring its history, and the third exploring opportunities and challenges for the field". Bruce Metcalf reviews that within these sections "There are two themes that run throughout the book. One is that studio jewelry should be critical. The other is that the most fertile territory for the present-day practitioner is in the realm of the hybrid."

AJF Best of Interviews was published in 2014 by Art Jewelry Forum. AJF Best of Interviews "corrals some of the site’s most interesting content: interviews with jewelry makers and others central to the field. Taking part in the 20 lively conversations are makers such as Lola Brooks, Tanel Veenre, and Jamie Bennett; dealers such as Sienna Patti; curators such as Bruce Pepich and Ursula Ilse-Neuman; and jewelry aficionados such as Madeleine Albright... The focus is on intelligent questions and the voices of the interviewees – captured in fresh, informal exchanges that will captivate lovers of art jewelry" writes Monica Moses, editor in chief at the American Craft Magazine published by the American Craft Council.

Show and Tales published by Art Jewelry Forum in 2015 and was released in Munich in conjunction with the annual Schmuck fair. Show and Tales focuses on exhibition making in regards to jewelry, making it the first ever publication on the topic. Show and Tales is broken into three sections that cover historical landmark exhibitions of jewelry, challenges in curating craft and jewelry, and exhibition reviews. It contains essays by Glenn Adamson (USA), David Beytelmann (AR), Susan Cummins (USA), Liesbeth den Besten (NL), Monica Gaspar (ES), Toni Greenbaum (USA), Marthe Le Van (USA), Benjamin Lignel (FR), Kellie Riggs (USA), Damian Skinner (NZ), Jorunn Veiteberg (NO), Namita Gupta Wiggers (USA), among others.

== Exhibitions ==
Art Jewelry Forum produced an exhibition titled Geography, which was shown in 2011 at SOFA Chicago and at the Society of North American Goldsmiths conference in Seattle in 2011. Geography was a thematic exhibition focusing on the scientific view of physical geography, the relational cultural geography, and the effects of natural surroundings on artists. Geography was curated by Susan Cummins and Mike Holmes and features over seventy pieces of jewelry from a wide array of international artists:

Fran Allison, Talya Baharal, Agelio Batle, Suzanne Beautyman, David Bielander, Alexander Blank, Iris Bodemer, Angela Bubash, Eric Burris, Suzanne Carlsen, Attai Chen, Jim Cotter, Willemijn de Greef, Bettina Dittlmann, Georg Dobler, Iris Eichenberg, Jantje Fleischhut, Karen Gilbert, Gabrielle Gould, Mielle Harvey, Stefan Heuser, Rory Hooper, Marian Hosking, Sergey Jiventin, Soyeon Kim, Jenny Klemming, Brooke Marks Swanson, Sharon Massey, Christine Matthias, Fritz Maierhofer, Malaika Najem, Annelies Planteydt, Alan Preston, Ramon Puig i Cuyàs, Tina Rath, Miriam Rowe, Deborah Rudolph, Estela Saez, Dana Seachuga, Nolia Shakti, Deganit Stern Schocken, Joyce Scott, Helen Shirk, Despo Sophocleous, Cynthia Toops, Julia Turner, Tarja Tuupanen, Sally von Bargen, Lisa Walker, Areta Wilkinson, Francis Willemstijn, Andrea Williams, Nancy Worden

== Grants ==
Art Jewelry Forum awards grants in three categories; Emerging Artist Award, Exhibition Award, and Speakers and Writers Awards.

=== Emerging Artist Award ===
The Emerging Artist Award is annual juried award of emerging artists who make wearable art jewelry with a prize of US$7,500.

Past winners include:

- 2014-Seulgi Kwon
- 2013- Sooyeon Kim
- 2012- Noon Passama Sanpatchayapong
- 2011-Farrah Al-Dujaili
- 2010 Agnes Larsson
- 2009- Sharon Massey
- 2008- Masumi Kataoka
- 2007- Andrea Janosik
- 2006- Natalya Pinchuk

=== Exhibition Award ===
The Exhibition Award aims to financially assist with exhibitions and catalogs that focus on art jewelry. Unlike the annual Artist Award, the Exhibition Award applications are rolling; the Exhibition Award is based on merit of the proposed project, and Art Jewelry Forums annual funds.

Past support of the Exhibition Award has gone to:

- 2012- Shift: Contemporary Makers That Define, Expand and Contradict The Field of Art Jewelry, Grunwald Gallery of Art, Indiana University, for exhibition support
- 2011- Geography, Art Jewelry Forum, for catalog publication
- 2010- Atelier Janiyé and the Legacy of Miye Matsukata, Fuller Craft Museum, for catalog publication
- 2009- Lisa Gralnick: The Gold Standard, Bellevue Arts Museum, for exhibition support
- 2009- Adornment and Excess:Jewelry in the 21st Century, Miami University Art Museum, for exhibition support
- 2008- Decorative Resurgence, Rowan University, for catalog publication
- 2007- Women of Metal, University of Wisconsin at Whitewater, for exhibition support
- 2006- For Zymrina, A Prostitute of Pompeii, Houston Museum of Fine Arts, acquisition of Keith Lewis’ Neckpiece
- 2005- Craft Emergency Relief Fund

=== Speakers and Writers Award ===
Art Jewelry Forum awards the Speaker and Writers Award to individuals who are critically engaged in the field. Most often the award is granted to help cover expenses of speakers and panelists at the annual Sculptural Objects and Functional Art (SOFA) NY and the SOFA Chicago fairs, and the annual Society of North American Goldsmiths conference.

Past recipients of the Speakers and Writers Award are:

- 2012- Kiff Slemmons, More Than One to Make One, lecture, SOFA Chicago
- 2012- Garth Clark, Who's Your Daddy, keynote lecture, Society of North American Goldsmiths
- 2012, Ursula Ilse-Neuman, The Transcendent Jewelry of Margaret De Patta: Vision in Motion, lecture, SOFA NY
- 2011- Contributing Writers: Jillian Moore, Gabriel Craig, commissioning of articles for Art Jewelry Forum
- 2011- Davra Taragin, Iris Eichenberg, Seth Papac, Gemma Draper, Monomater, panel discussion, SOFA Chicago
- 2011- Jeannine Falino, For People Who Are Slightly Mad, lecture, SOFA NY

== Founder and select staff ==
Susan Cummins is the founder of AJF. She is also the director for the Rotasa Foundation, and previously owned and operated Susan Cummins Gallery for eighteen years until its closing in 2002.

Yvonne Montoya is the current executive director of Art Jewelry Forum

Nathalie Mornu is the current editor and writer for AJF. Nathalie Mornu has edited nonfiction and DIY books for the last 15 years; she has a particular interest in jewelry and crafts. She spent five years at the Appalachian Center for Craft studying jewelry fabrication and furniture-making before changing course altogether and getting a degree in journalism. Nathalie then spent a dozen years in the editorial department at Lark Books, where her background in crafts proved an excellent fit. In her tenure at Lark, she worked with former Art Jewelry Forum editor Damian Skinner to copy edit Contemporary Jewelry in Perspective. Noto

== Board of Directors/Chairpersons ==
Bonnie Levine Board Chair | Chair of the Trips Committee Sarah Turner Treasurer

John Rose Marketing Director

Cindi Strauss Chair of the Editorial Committee

Bella Neyman Chair of the Events and Trips Committee

Marta Costa Reis Chair of the Award and Grant Committee

== Board Members ==
Sofia Björkman

Raïssa Bump (past Board Chair)

Emily Cobb

Barbara Paris Gifford

Toni Greenbaum

David Dao

Noto
