= Ramona Solberg =

American artist, art teacher, and jeweler

Ramona Lorraine Solberg
- Born: May 10, 1921; Watertown, South Dakota, US
- Died: June 13, 2005 (aged 84); Seattle, Washington, US
- Occupations: jewelry designer, teacher
- Years active: 1956–2005
- Known for: substantial, innovative jewelry design

Ramona Solberg (1921–2005) created jewelry using found objects; she taught at the University of Washington School of Art and has been referred to as the "grandmother of Northwest found-art jewelry." Additionally, she served as an art instructor and a prolific jewelry artist in and around Seattle for three decades.

== Biography ==
Ramona Lorraine Solberg was born on 10 May 1921, in Watertown, South Dakota, but her family relocated to Seattle, Washington before Solberg's second birthday. She enlisted in the Women’s Army Corps in 1943 during the Second World War and served until 1950. Using her G.I. Bill benefits, she went to Mexico where she studied jewelry and textile design at the University of Michoacan in Morelia and textiles at the Belias Artes in San Miguel de Allende. She then studied in Oslo, Norway at Statens Kunst og Handverk Skole and worked with jewelry and enameling. Upon returning to the United States, she completed both a Bachelor's of Arts and a Master's of Fine Arts degree at the University of Washington and also studied with Ruth Penington.

From 1951 to 1956, Solberg taught at James Monroe Jr. High School and then worked until 1967 as an associate professor at Central Washington University in Ellensburg, Washington. From that time until her 1983 retirement, Solberg was an art professor at the University of Washington. Solberg is often associated with Pacific Northwest artists and jewelers and she taught like Laurie Hall, Ron Ho, Kiff Slemmons, and Nancy Worden.

== Artwork ==
Though Solberg made some jewelry in her studies and she did not create her first piece of jewelry using beads and found objects until 1956, while at Central Washington State College. Her jewelry was large, rather than typical delicate, precious jewelry. She created her jewelry to be worn and to be worn by large women.

In the 1960s, she began traveling. Her first round-the-world trip included visits to Japan, Taiwan, Hong Kong and Nepal, where she picked up beads at every stop. When she returned, she published a book "Inventive Jewelry Making" in 1972. Solberg and a Seattle group called Friends of the Crafts began making annual travels through Europe, the Middle East, Southeast Asia, Africa and even one trip to Antarctica to both study crafts in other areas and obtain artifacts that could be used in their own works.

Solberg was honored as a Fellow of the Council by the American Craft Council for her leadership and ability as an artist and teacher. Craft historian Vicki Halper curated a major traveling exhibition in 2001-2002, along with writing a comprehensive, illustrated accompanying publication, after conducting an extensive (35 page transcribed) oral history.

Solberg worked on jewelry right up to her death. She died 13 June 2005 in Seattle, Washington.

== Collections ==
- Museums of Contemporary Crafts in New York City
- King County Arts Commission in Seattle, Washington
- Smithsonian American Art Museum
- Tacoma Art Museum in Tacoma, Washington
