= List of deaf world records in athletics =

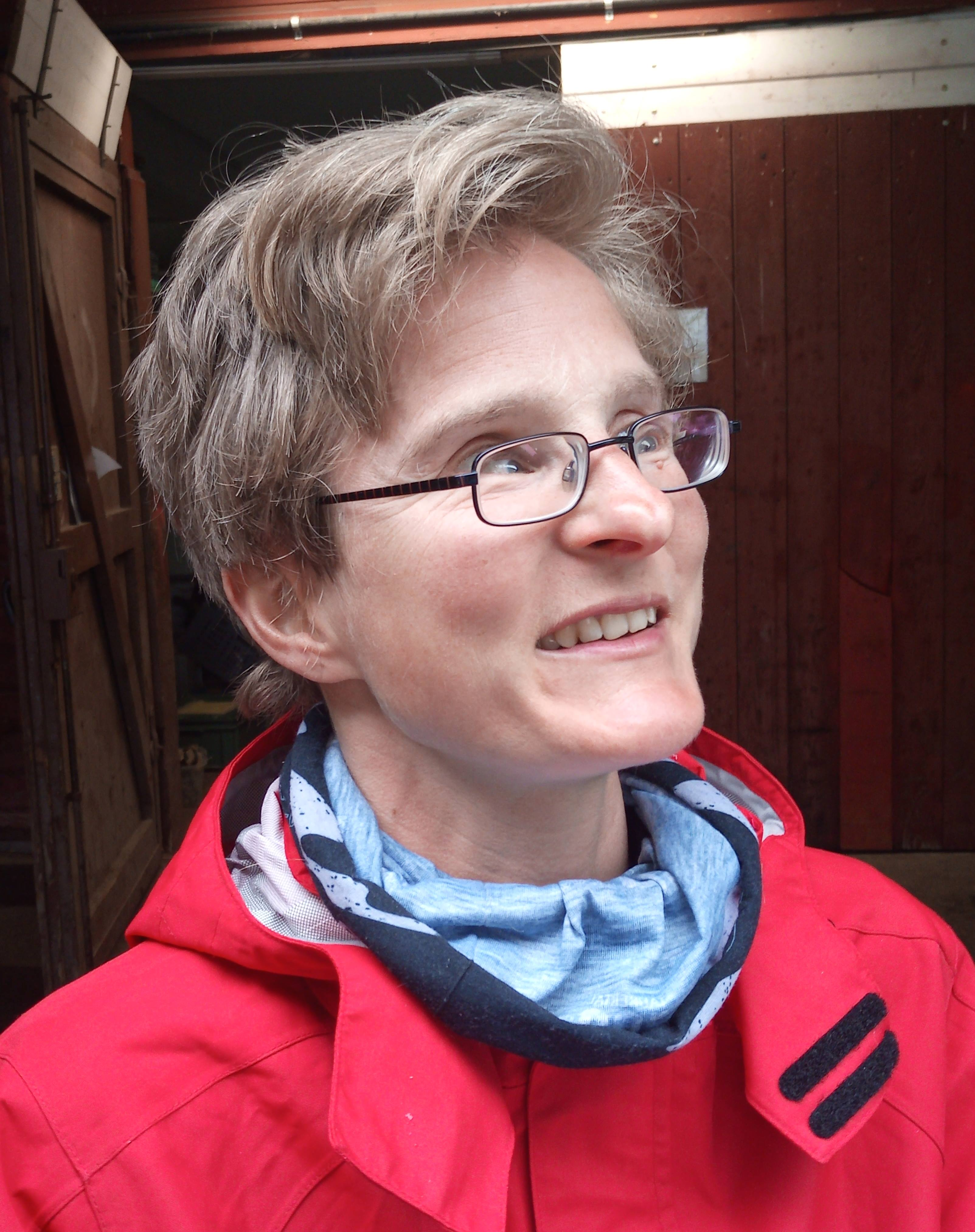
Germany's Nele Alder-Baerens holds multiple world records from the 10K run up to 100 kilometres.

Deaf world records in athletics are the best marks set in an event by a deaf person in the sport of athletics. The International Committee of Sports for the Deaf is responsible for ratification and it analyses each record before approving it. Records may be set in any continent and at any competition, providing that the correct measures are in place (such as wind-gauges) to allow for a verifiable and legal mark.

== Men ==
Event	Record	Athlete	Nationality	Date	Meet	Place	Ref.
100 m	10.21	Wendell Gaskin, Jr.	United States	1 June 1996		San Jose, United States	
200 m	20.60	Eric Gregory	United States	28 May 2022		Geneva, United States	
400 m	45.29	Wendell Gaskin, Jr.	United States	17 July 1994		Knoxville, United States	
800 m	1:49.7 h	Leo Bond III	United States	21 July 1977		Bucharest, Romania	
1000 m	2:25.34	Javier Soto Rey	Spain	29 July 2003		Madrid, Spain	
1500 m	3:48.69	Baxtone Menjo	Kenya	17 July 2012		Toronto, Canada	
Mile	4:15.6	Timo Karvonen	Finland	21 August 1979	Kuopio, Finland		
2000 m	5:26.2	Timo Karvonen	Finland	25 August 1979	Turku, Finland		
3000 m	8:18.95	Ralph Van Houwelingen	Netherlands	10 May 2018	Vught, Netherlands		
5000 m	13:52.83	Ian Wambui	Kenya	24 November 2025	Deaflympics	Tokyo, Japan	
10,000 m	29:07.53	Timothy Butler	Great Britain	23 June 1989	Birmingham, United Kingdom		
10 km (road)	29:38	Ralph Van Houwelingen	Netherlands	12 February 2023	Schoorl, Netherlands		
15 km (road)	46:56	Vladislav Yakubovskiy	Russia	8 August 2009	Moscow, Russia		
20,000 m	1:02:05.8	Taieb Tounsi	France	9 July 1988	Saint-Maur-des-Fossés, France		
20 km (road)	1:05:03	Vladislav Yakubovskiy	Russia	24 September 2006	Korolyov, Russia		
25,000 m	1:22:37.8	Pauli Savolainen	Finland	12 September 1966	Jyväskylä, Finland		
25 km (road)	1:21:21.0	Nikolay Vasiyiev	Soviet Union	27 July 1973	Malmö, Sweden		
30,000 m	2:04:17	Alfredo de los Mozos	Spain	7 June 2003	Wuppertal, Germany		
30 km (road)	1:38.55	Daniel Kiptum	Kenya	29 July 2017	Samsun, Turkey		
Half marathon	1:03:49	Otto Kingstedt	Sweden	10 March 2024	Ghent, Belgium		
One hour	19.302 km	Taieb Tounsi	France	9 July 1988	Saint-Maur-des-Fossés, France		
Marathon	2:11:31	Daniel Kiptum	Kenya	17 April 2011	Zürich, Switzerland		
100 km (road)	9:42:09	Jörg Rosenbaum	Germany	30 April 2016	Wuppertal, Germany		
3000 m steeplechase	8:50.39	Rafał Nowak	Poland	11 August 2011	Bydgoszcz, Poland		
110 m hurdles	14.04 (+0.6 m/s)	Joshua Hembrough	United States	24 April 2010	West Lafayette, United States		
400 m hurdles	49.1 h	Vyacheslav Skomorokhov	Soviet Union	15 October 1968	Mexico City, Mexico		
High jump	2.13 m	Denis Fedorenkov	Russia	25 July 2017	Deaflympics	Samsun, Turkey	
Pole vault	5.06 m	Patrick Southern	United States	15 April 2006	Lincoln, United States		
Long jump	7.94 m	Charles Smith	United States	30 July 1983	New Britain, United States		
Triple jump	16.15 m (+1.0 m/s)	Aliaksandr Maistrenka	Belarus	6 June 2025 (Note: by World Athletics source; 6 July 2025 by ICSD source, probably a typo)	Republican competition "We Are Together"	Brest, Belarus	
Shot put	17.41 m	Vytenis Ivaskevicius	Lithuania	26 July 2019	Wattenscheid, Germany		
Discus throw	64.48 m	Masateru Yugami	Japan	26 April 2025	Oklahoma Throws Series	Ramona, United States	
Hammer throw	63.71 m	Masatoshi Morimoto	Japan	18 May 2013	Amagasaki, Japan		
Javelin throw	73.47 m	Jesus Garcia Abreu	Venezuela	13 September 2009	Taipei, Taiwan	Current design	
Pentathlon	3182 pts	Viktor Bogdanov	Soviet Union	10 August 1969	Belgrade, Serbia		
Decathlon	7964 pts	Dean Barton-Smith	Australia	10 March 1992	Adelaide, Australia		
20,000 m walk (track)	1:25:37.8	Gerhard Sperling	East Germany	24 June 1972	Erfurt, Germany		
20 km walk (road)	1:28:17.4	Gerhard Sperling	East Germany	10 August 1969	Belgrade, Serbia		
50 km walk (road)	4:14:44.2	Gheorghe Vadraru	Romania	22 October 1978	Buzău, Romania		
4 × 100 m relay	41.15	Shogo Sakata; Yoshifumi Adachi; Maki Yamada; Takuma Sasaki	Japan	22 July 2024	Taipei, Taiwan		
4 × 100 m relay	41.1 h	John Milford; Gary Namba; Curtis Garner; Michael Farnady	United States	24 July 1977	Bucharest, Romania		
4 × 200 m relay	1:35.7 h	Marek Krauze; Michael Czarnetzki; Matthias Tamm; Aleksandar Markovic	Germany (GSV Wuppertal)	18 April 1992	Paris, France		
4 × 400 m relay	3:12.64	Artur Abdrakhmanov; Konstantin Grebenshchikov; Viacheslav Redkin; Nikita Novikov	Russia	3 August 2013	Sofia, Bulgaria		
4 × 800 m relay	8:27.6 h	Volker Klockner; Dieter Norf; Christoph Lisseck; Axel Krennrich	West Germany (GSV Wuppertal)	26 August 1989	Wuppertal, Germany		
4 × 1500 m relay	17:30.4 h	Dietmar Marschner; Dieter Norf; Christoph Lisseck; Axel Krennrich	West Germany (GSV Wuppertal)	26 August 1989	Wuppertal, Germany		

== Women ==
Event	Record	Athlete	Nationality	Date	Meet	Place	Ref.
100 m	11.68 (+0.3 m/s)	Pamera Losange	France	7 May 2022	Caxias do Sul, Brazil		
200 m	23.87 (+1.2 m/s)	Pamera Losange	France	23 November 2025	Deaflympics	Tokyo, Japan	
400 m	55.35	Alena Tsiarentsyeva	Belarus	31 July 2013	Sofia, Bulgaria		
800 m	2:07.5 h	Rita Windbrake	West Germany	3 July 1977	Bonn, West Germany		
1000 m	2:46.8 h	Rita Windbrake	West Germany	10 July 1981	Troisdorf, West Germany		
1500 m	4:25.25	Rita Windbrake	West Germany	18 July 1981	Gelsenkirchen, West Germany		
Mile	4:59.15	Candy Hawkins	United Kingdom	18 May 1997	Ashford, Great Britain		
2000 m	6:30.39	Nele Alder-Baerens	Germany	1 May 2003	Berlin, Germany		
3000 m	9:40.1 h	Olga Yakubovskaya	Russia	11 July 2008	Moscow, Russia		
5000 m	16:23.27	Melinda Vernon	Australia	13 September 2009	Taipei, Taiwan		
10,000 m	33:22.70	Melinda Vernon	Australia	10 December 2009	Melbourne, Australia		
10 km (road)	36:52	Nele Alder-Baerens	Germany	5 August 2006	Berlin, Germany		
15 km (road)	54:18	Olga Yakubovskaya	Russia	8 August 2009	Moscow, Russia		
20 km (road)	1:18:49	Nele Alder-Baerens	Germany	29 September 2013	Berlin, Germany		
Half marathon	1:21:43+	Yang Chunhua	China	25 November 2025	Deaflympics	Tokyo, Japan	
25 km (road)	1:38:21	Nele Alder-Baerens	Germany	29 September 2013	Berlin, Germany		
30 km (road)	1:57:54	Nele Alder-Baerens	Germany	29 September 2013	Berlin, Germany		
Marathon	2:46:07	Nele Alder-Baerens	Germany	29 September 2013	Berlin, Germany		
100 km (road)	7:22:41	Nele Alder-Baerens	Germany	8 September 2018	Sveti Martin na Muri, Croatia		
3000 m steeplechase	10:34.95	Olga Yakubovskaya	Russia	11 September 2009	Taipei, Taiwan		
80 m hurdles	11.6	Nina Ivanova	Soviet Union	13 August 1969	Belgrade, Serbia		
100 m hurdles	14.20 (−0.4 m/s)	Yuliia Shapoval	Ukraine	2 August 2013	Sofia, Bulgaria		
400 m hurdles	1:00.22	Asya Khaladzhan	Russia	24 July 2017	Samsun, Turkey		
High jump	1.80 m	Kristina Karapetyan	Russia	29 June 2016	Stara Zagora, Bulgaria		
Pole vault	4.00 m	Marie Riveraeau	France	8 May 2022		Caxias do Sul, Brazil	
Long jump	6.24 m (−1.0 m/s)	Suslaidy Girat Rivero	Cuba	19 July 2012	Toronto, Canada		
Triple jump	13.63 m (−1.4 m/s)	Suslaidy Girat Rivero	Cuba	16 July 2012	Toronto, Canada		
Shot put	15.33 m	Ivana Kristoficova	Slovakia	1 August 2013	Sofia, Bulgaria		
Discus throw	58.54 m	Edie Boyer	United States	28 July 1995	Colorado Springs, United States		
Hammer throw	66.35 m	Trude Raad	Norway	23 July 2017	Samsun, Turkey		
Javelin throw	51.30 m	Laura Štefanac	Croatia	17 February 2024	Slovenian Winter Throwing Championships	Domžale, Slovenia	
Pentathlon	3592 pts	Nina Ivanova	Soviet Union	21 July 1977	Bucharest, Romania		
Heptathlon	5085 pts	Leja Glojnarič	Slovenia	21–22 August 2023	European Deaf Championships	Szczecin, Poland	
Heptathlon	100m H (wind) / High jump / Shot put / 200m (wind) / Long jump (wind) / Javelin / 800m; 14.74 (+0.4 m/s) / 1.74 m / 11.26 m / 26.66 (+1.8 m/s) / 5.51 m (+0.8 m/s) / 34.50 m / 2:32.04						
4 × 100 m relay	47.05	Alena Filushkina; Oxana Klimova; Marina Grishina; Ksenia Golovina	Russia	29 July 2017	Samsun, Turkey		
4 × 200 m relay	1:49.84	Elke Köster; Sonja Naber; Petra Klein; Myriam Brunke	Germany (GTSV Essen)	30 May 1993	Wuppertal, Germany		
4 × 400 m relay	3:48.14	Victoria Aksenova; Iuliia Abubiakirova; Ekaterina Kudriavtseva; Asya Khaladzhan	Russia	29 July 2017	Samsun, Turkey		
4 × 800 m relay	10:04.7 h	Ute Schuck; Birgit Willmerdinger; Heike Weidner; Rita Windbrake	West Germany	1 September 1984	Berlin, West Germany		

== See also ==
- List of deaf world records in swimming
- List of World Deaf Swimming Championships records
