= Tinel =

Tinel is a surname. Notable people with the surname include:

- Edgar Tinel (1854–1912), Belgian classical composer and pianist
- Jules Tinel (1879–1952), French neurologist
  - Tinel's sign

== See also ==
- Pinel
- Tanel
- Tiner
