= Marian Volráb =

Czech glass artist, painter, and university teacher

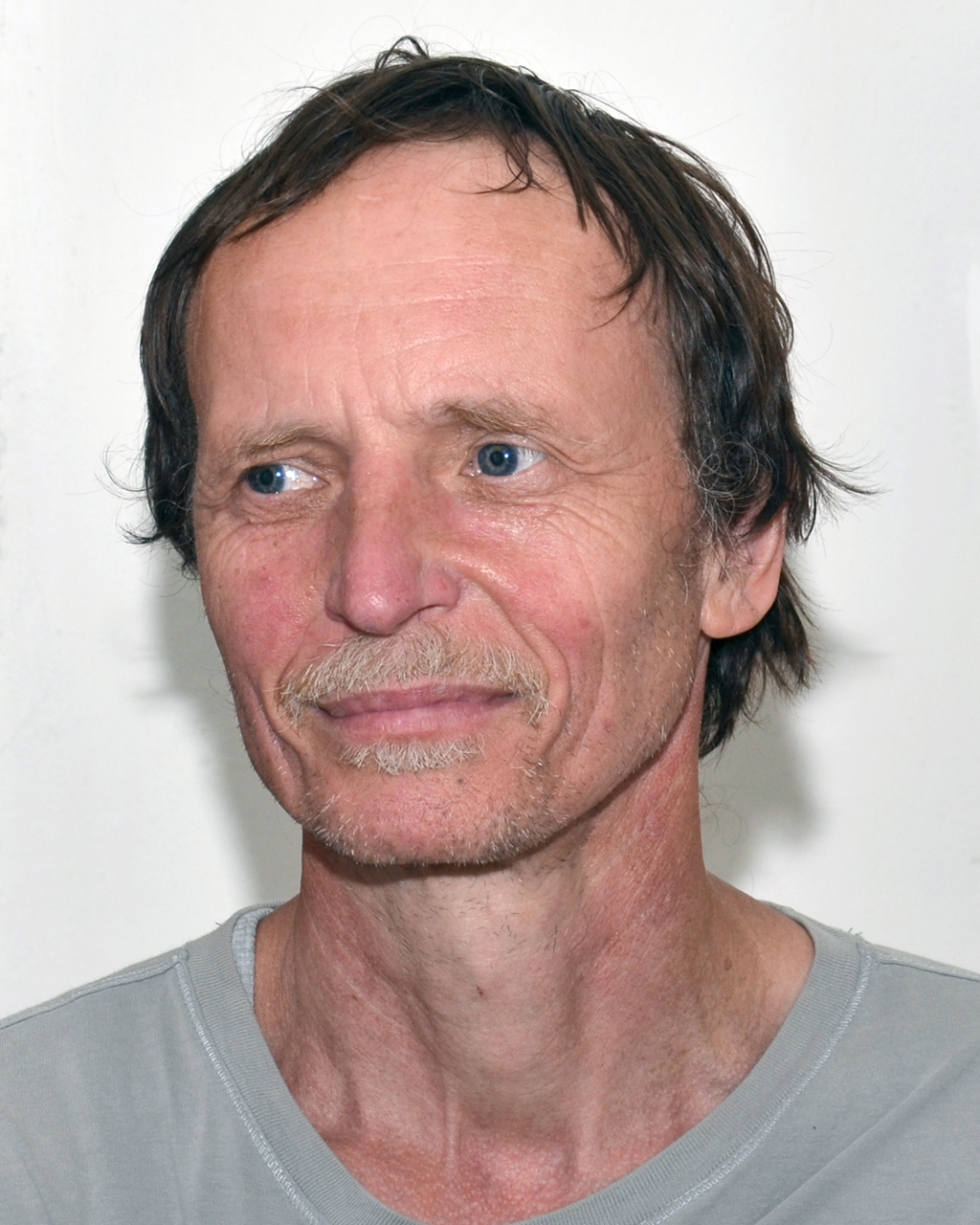
- Marian Volráb (2018)
- Born: Příbram, Czechoslovakia
- Education: Academy of Arts, Architecture and Design in Prague
- Known for: glass artist, painter and university teacher
- Awards: Coburger Glaspreiss, Honourable Mention (2006)

Marian Volráb is a Czech glass artist, painter and university teacher.

== Early life and education ==
Marian Volráb was born in Příbram, Czechoslovakia. He comes from the family of painter and glass artist Rudolf Volráb (1933–1969) and glass and fashion designer Libuše Šilhavá. He spent his youth in the countryside in his mother's birthplace in Volenice. His father died in 1969, but Marian Volráb was strongly influenced by his work.

He completed one year of glass apprenticeship in Poděbrady and then, between 1978 and 1982, studied at the Secondary School of Glass Arts in Kamenický Šenov, where the glass engraver and author of monumental charcoal drawings, Prof. Josef Kochrda, worked. He continued his studies at the Academy of Arts, Architecture and Design in Prague (1982–1988) in the glass studio of Stanislav Libenský and Jaroslav Svoboda.

== Career ==
From 1990 to 2008, he was an assistant professor in the glass studio of Vladimir Kopecký at the Academy of Arts, Architecture and Design in Prague.

His wife Alena Volrábová is an art historian and head of the collection of prints and drawings at the National Gallery in Prague. Volráb has been a member of Rubikon group since 2008. He lives and works in Prague, Nučice and Volenice, where he has his own studio.

=== Awards ===
- 2006 Coburger Glaspreiss, Honourable Mention

== Work ==
Volráb is one of the outstanding artists of the middle generation whose glass work is closely intertwined with his parallel painting work. This interrelationship takes many different forms. In the case of Marian Volráb, it is a kinship of two mutually balancing positions, which could be figuratively characterised as "darkness in glass – light in paintings". He finds inspiration in forms created by nature itself and finishes his molten or fused glass objects, similar to flowing lava, with coarse grinding disc.

=== Glass ===
Despite the material nature of glass, building on the effect of translucency, internal masses, vibrancy of colour, optical play of light etc., Volráb's glass is a world of dark corners, impenetrable walls of shapes, stripped of all effects of vitreousness. Its role lies in the secondary contexts and semantic subtexts of the perception of the essence of this contradiction-filled material and proves that the power of expression in glass does not necessarily depend on its spectacular external form.

His first realisations in glass in the 1980s were simple sets of utility glass of uncomplicated shapes. Very soon, however, he applied painting and engraving to the utility shapes of glass. The coloured and engraved compositions eventually became dominant and subjugating the expression of the object, the vessels became sculptural objects telling about the personal perception of things from everyday life. From the beginning, Volráb's language in the manner of engraving was very lapidary, rawly austere without embellishments. Volráb's work with glass became characterised by the style that counterbalanced the massive cuts with only small "graphic" structures of splinter cuts. But this does not mean anything in the sense of reduced emotionality and sensitivity. It is precisely this external roughness and shape characteristics that are significantly more effective in terms of expression than a descriptive filigree engraving ever could.

In the 1990s he created a group of objects made of layered glass blown into a mould. The objects take the form of massive stereometric shapes, cylinders leaning on a tapered leg or standing on edge, lenticular discs, etc. Often, the signal colour of the enamel bears a distant resemblance to the forms of some kind of children's toys, but their surface again bears the vigorous engraving of figuration, the letter structures of old tombstones or stylised landscape forms. This makes them into objects – fateful "signs". However, the form of application on the "inappropriate", non-pretentiously playful shapes also protects their appearance from demonstrative gloomy soulfulness.

The artist also used the technique of engraving into layered blown shapes in another larger series of cylindrical objects with landscape motifs. Although the starting point is a simple form, through fissures, slits, notches, relief-cut shapes on the surface, and structural treatment of the surfaces, these objects create fascinating panoramas of archetypal landscapes in which there is room to contemplate the nature and importance of basic human things. His engravings seem to lay bare a person's innermost feelings, his process of experiencing the world composed of many fragmented emotions. They are difficult to grasp and describe, and would lose their persuasiveness with any attempt at pictorial representation. They can only be fleetingly hinted at by proxy "images"- landscapes of the nooks and crannies of consciousness without concrete shapes and events.

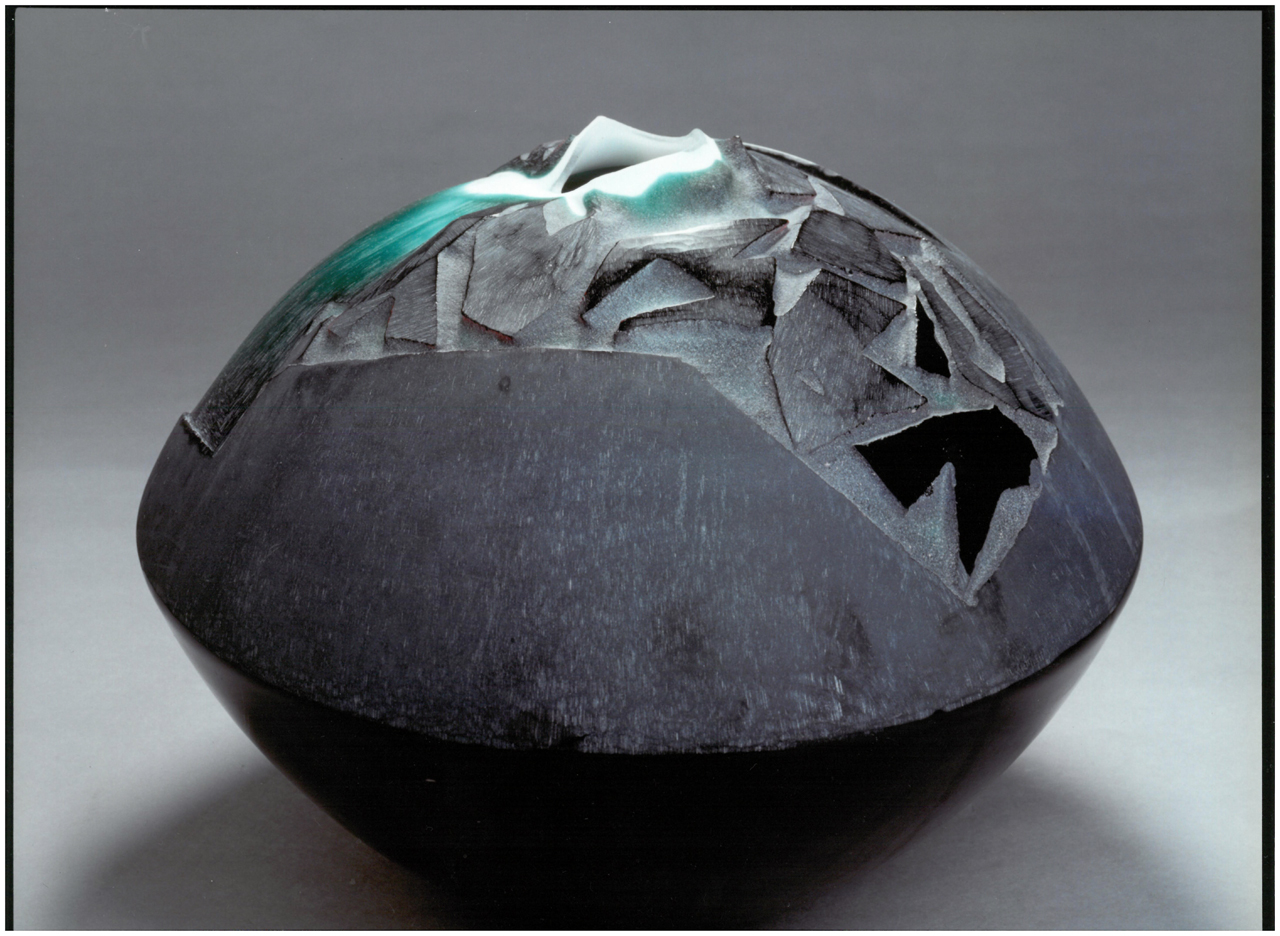
Past', layered blown, cut, engraved glass, 30 x 40 cm, 1992

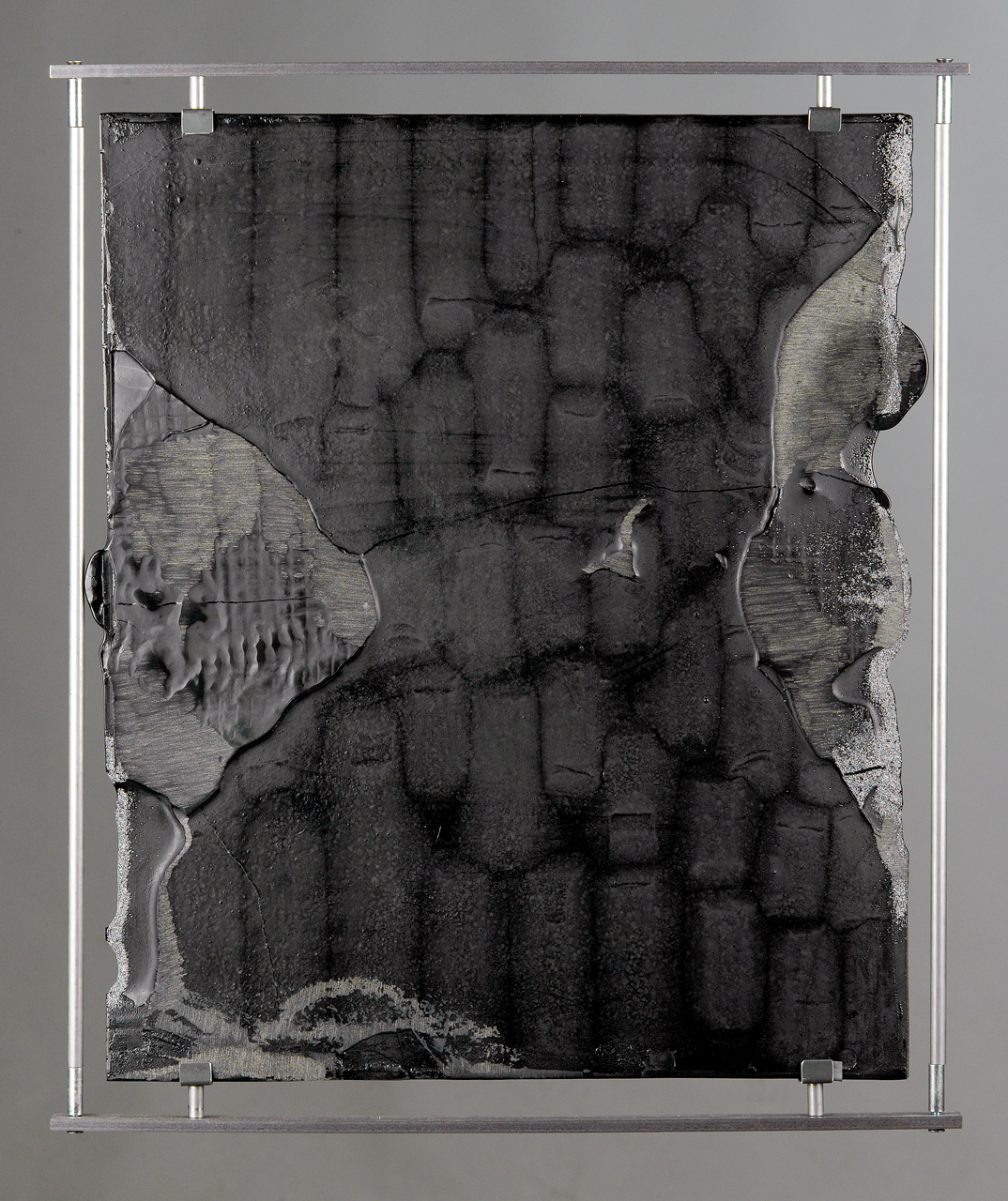
View I.', molten, cut and engraved glass, 57 x 47 cm, 2007

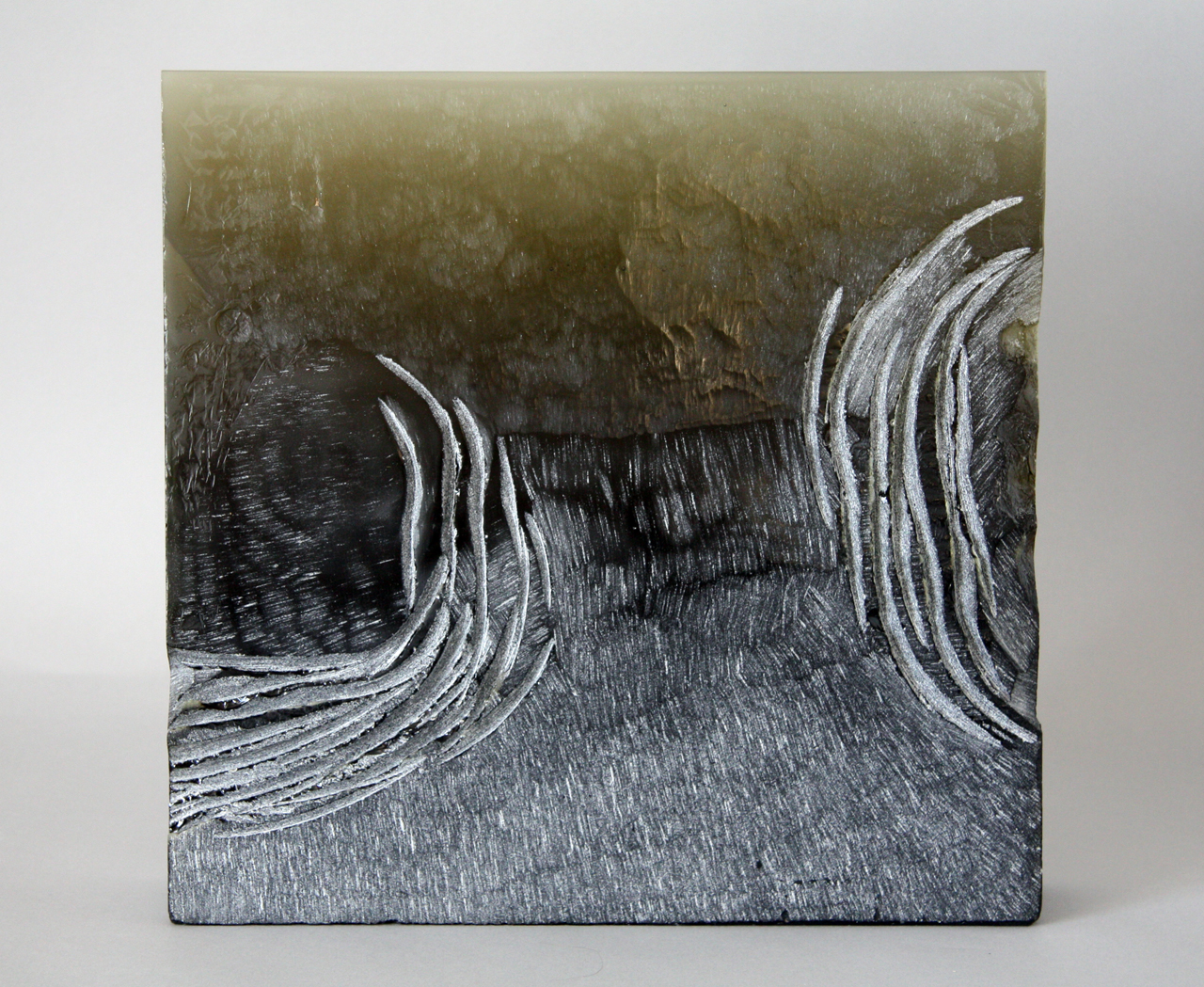
Winter landscape (Storm)', molten glass, cut and engraved, 39 x 40 cm, 2010

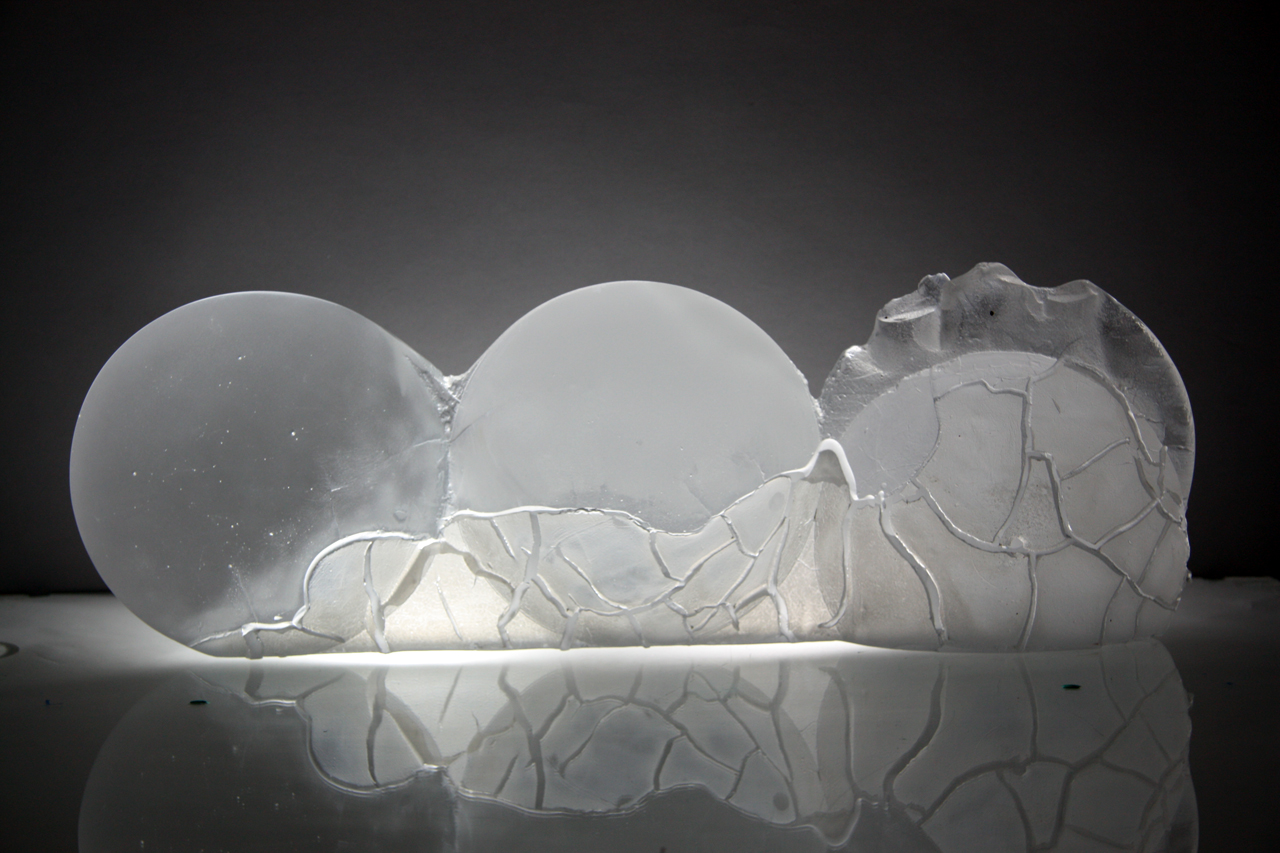
Microworld III, molten glass, cut engraving, 22 x 64 x 7 cm, 2012

Since 2000, Volráb's works developed a similar imaginative landscape feature. His fused glass panels are completely reduced in colour, with sandblasted and cut relief elements, horizontal bands with transparencies or completely dark silhouettes. Despite the outward resemblance, they are not a realistic representation of the natural scenery. The works evoke the feeling of being in a confined space that represents a kind of intimate place, open to the awareness of private and hidden hopes, disappointments, joys and sorrows and all the contradictions of human emotions. The dark multi-part rivers may be prompted by the experience of perceived reality but they can also be a parable of the hidden submerged rivers in human souls. Miroslava Hlaváčková sees parallels in Volráb's sculptures with the imagination of Franz Kafka or the raw and poignant paintings of Alén Diviš and compares them to a volcanic force that leaves traces of boiling and gradual solidification, during which matter is stretched, shrivelled, collapsed and structured into new units.

His heads with absent facial features are also strongly emotive – whether in the form of stylised silhouettes or suggestive shapes cut into square panels. Instead, the contour area is scarred by extensive interventions, like a matrix in which all the good and bad experiences have been imprinted. Despite the vigour of the treatment and the rawness of the interventions, it does not give the impression of experiencing cruelty, the glass torn by massive cuts is not hurtful. There is a rather soothing silence of reconciliation in them, as in the wrinkled faces of old people who have gone through life's experiences both painful and filled with happiness. On the standing square panels, the surface of the stylized face is formed by deep linear incisions, leading to destruction through the plate glass. The silhouette of the head shining through the dark background shines as a place where light penetrates the darkness of the events. The object can thus be a testimony of hope, whether it is hidden in someone close or in a vision called "angel".

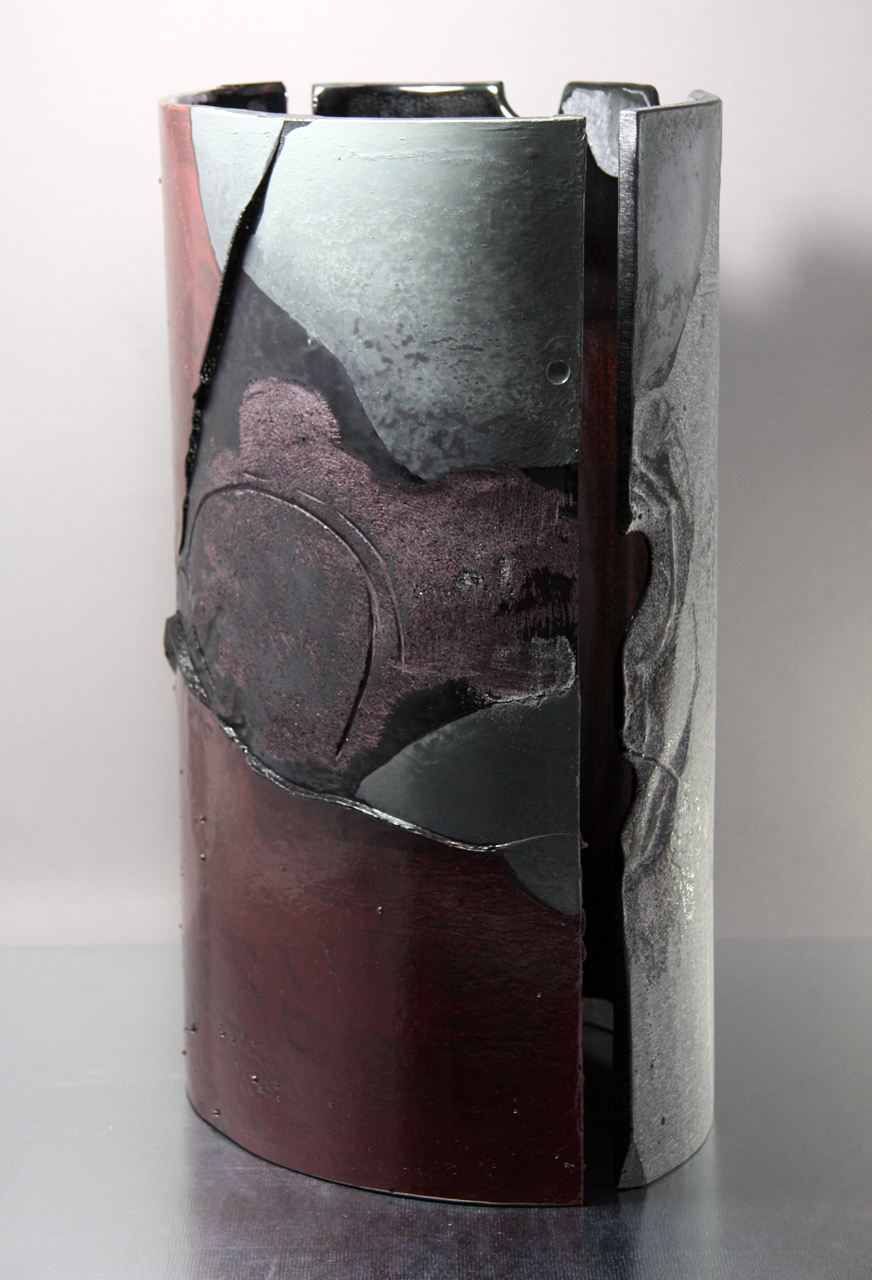
Community I., molten, laid, painted, cut and engraved glass, 60 x 41 x 31 cm, 2012

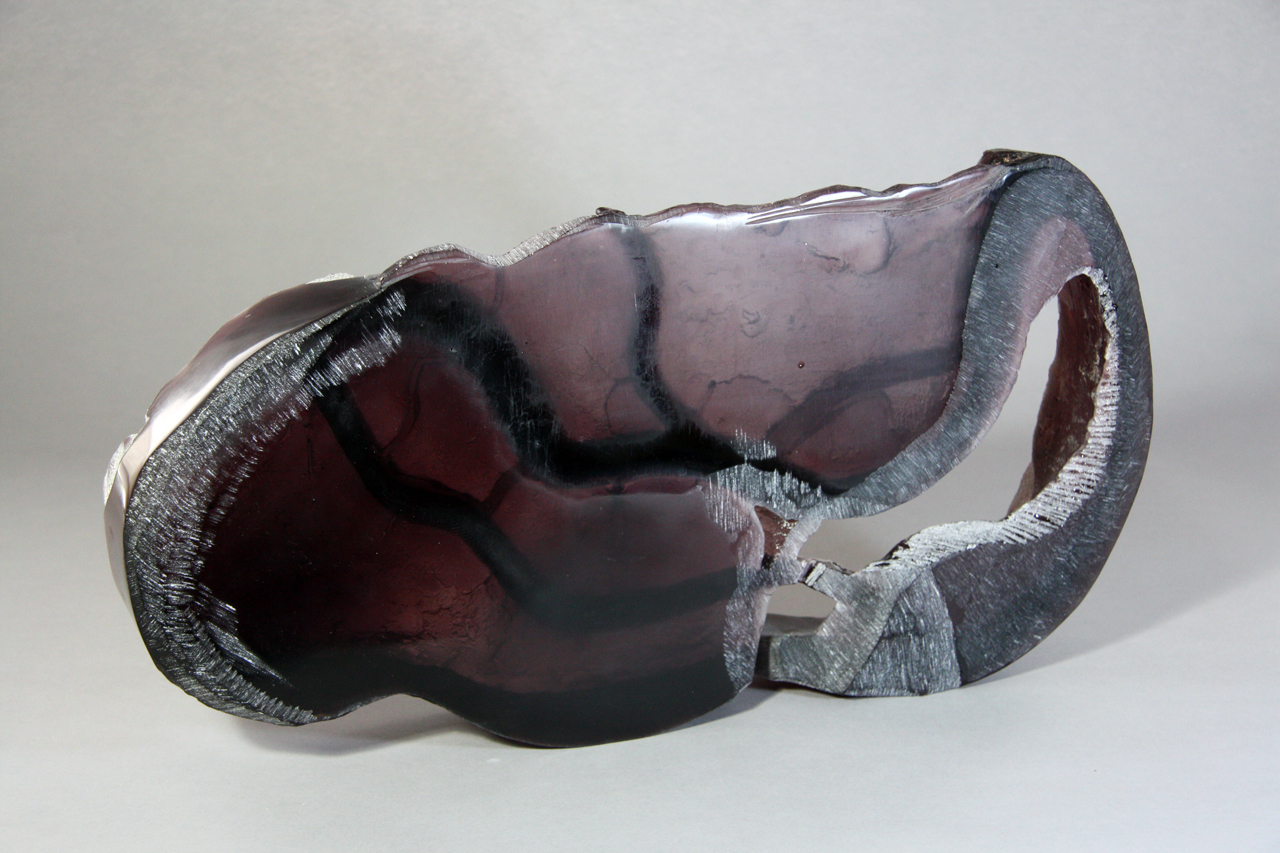
Life I, molten glass, cut and engraved, 39 x 59 x 8 cm, 2014

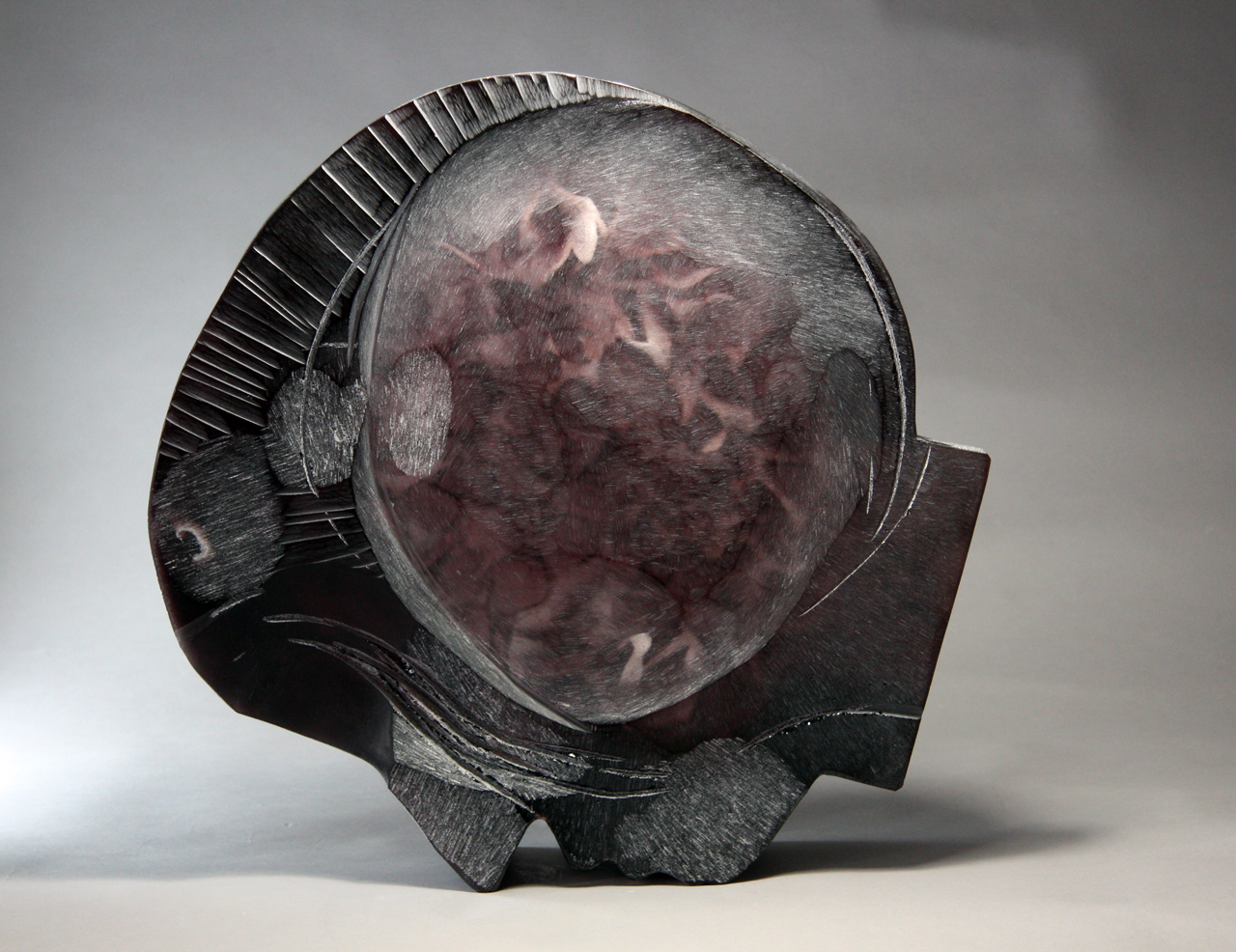
Profile', molten glass, cut engraving, 48 x 49 x 10 cm, 2015

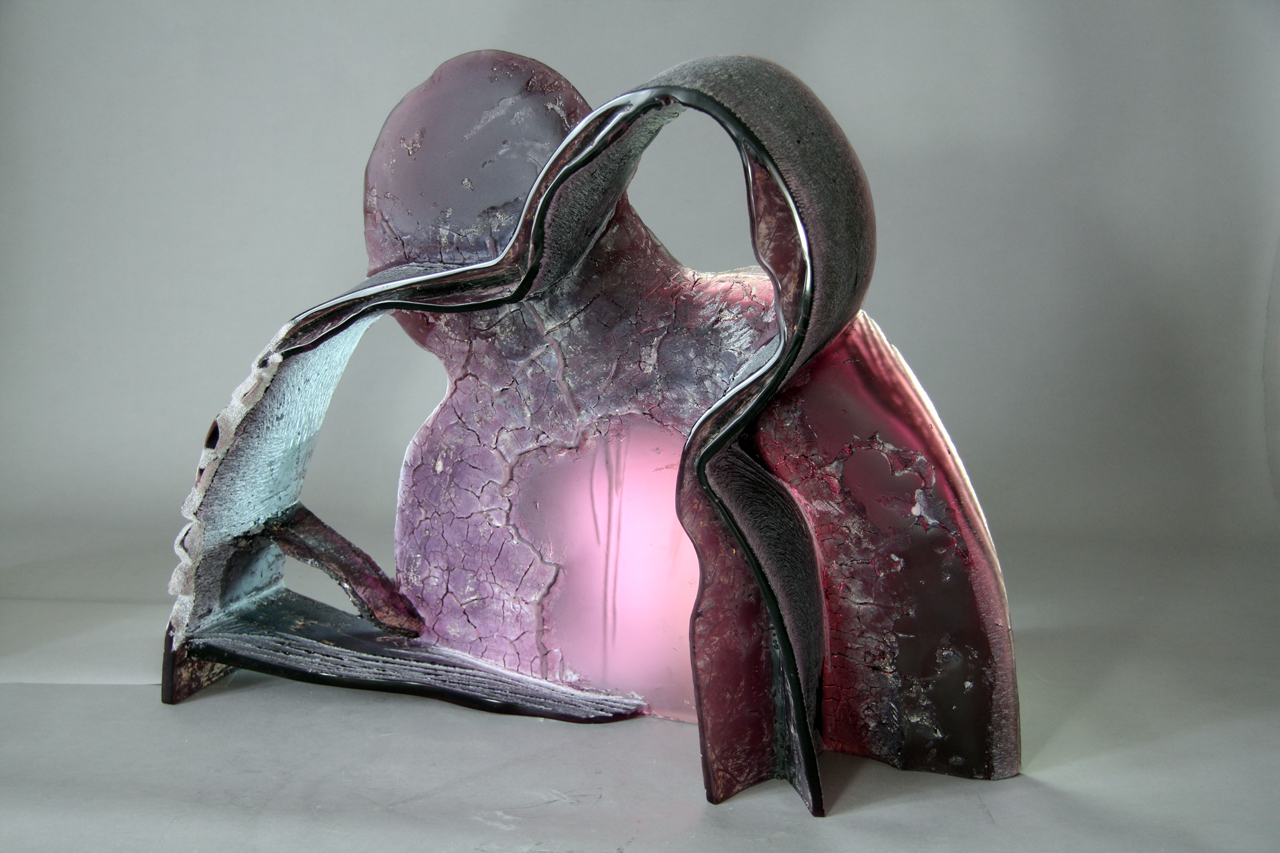
Passing by', molten glass, cut engraving, 50 x 64 x 12 cm, 2018

=== Painting ===
Alongside his glass realisations, Volráb's paintings are full of soft light, fragility and subtlety of colour. The harsh, rough, unrelieved appearance of the glass is replaced by a subtle tremulousness of lines and surfaces, often overlapping or half-erased, as if the sought-after shape is being born with difficulty, hesitantly searching for its true form. Although the motifs of the figures are encrypted in them, they again take the form of a kind of inner landscapes. They are not filled with nervous tension, but rather with calm, although the plot set in them is not devoid of traumatic moments. His characters feel despondency, loneliness or imprisonment (Anxiety, 2007). The manifestations of intimate experiences, feelings and relationships of the human individual are dealt with in the series Close Being I-V (2012). Everything seems to be observed behind a silk veil of understanding reconciliation.

The paintings seem like an indistinct dream that cannot be understood, but it is possible to find oneself right in the middle of it. Even though Volráb's paintings have much in common with landscapes, they are rather records of situations in an environment where something is being born, expanded and formed. As early as 1997, the colour palette was limited to white and shades of grey, with accents of colour here and there, but stillness or almost imperceptible movement of an almost cinematic nature prevailed. It was only in 2006-2008 that drama began to unfold on the white surface, and the energetic and dynamic brushstrokes are reminiscent of a snowstorm.

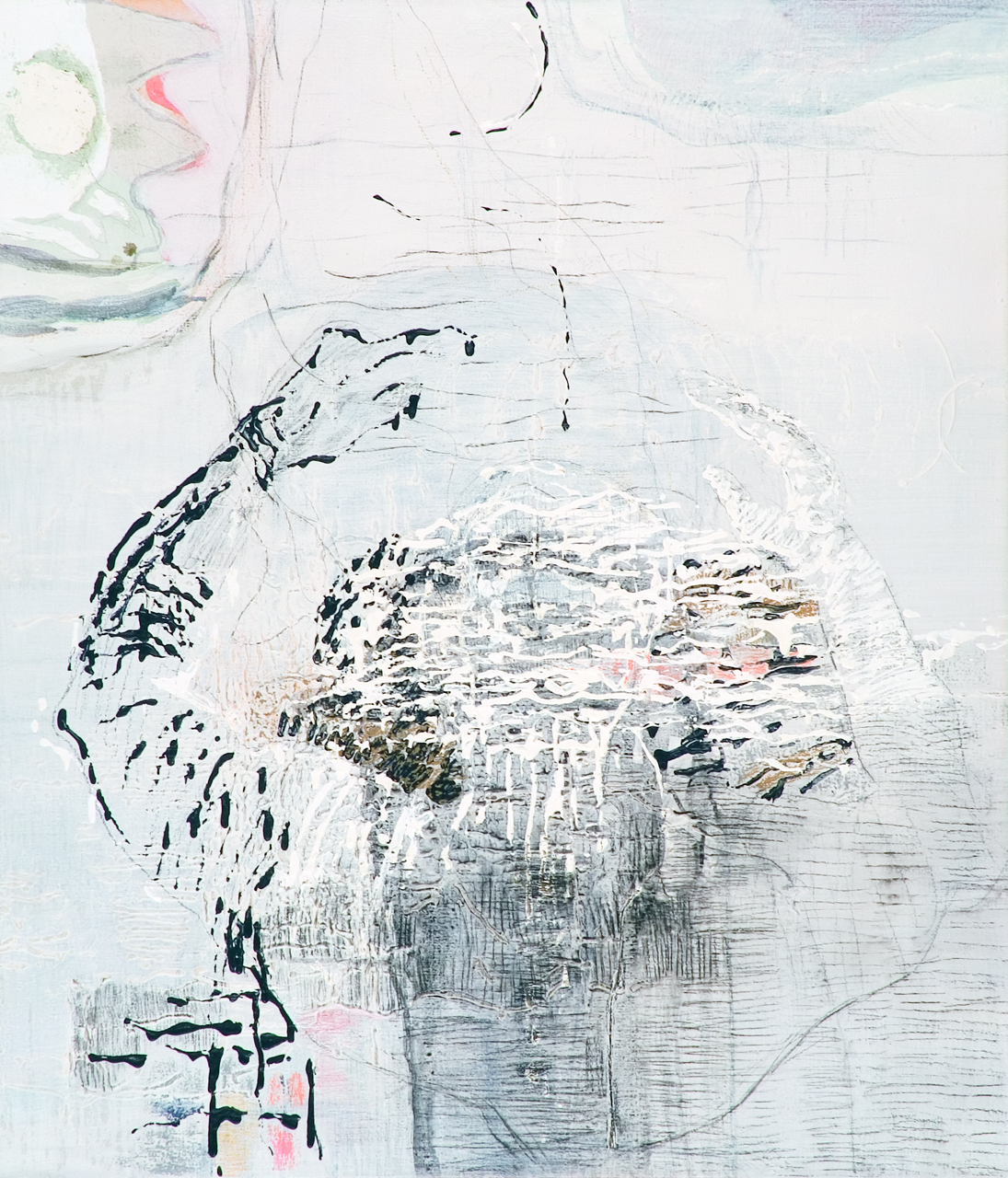
Anxiety', acrylic on canvas, 110 x 95 cm, 2007

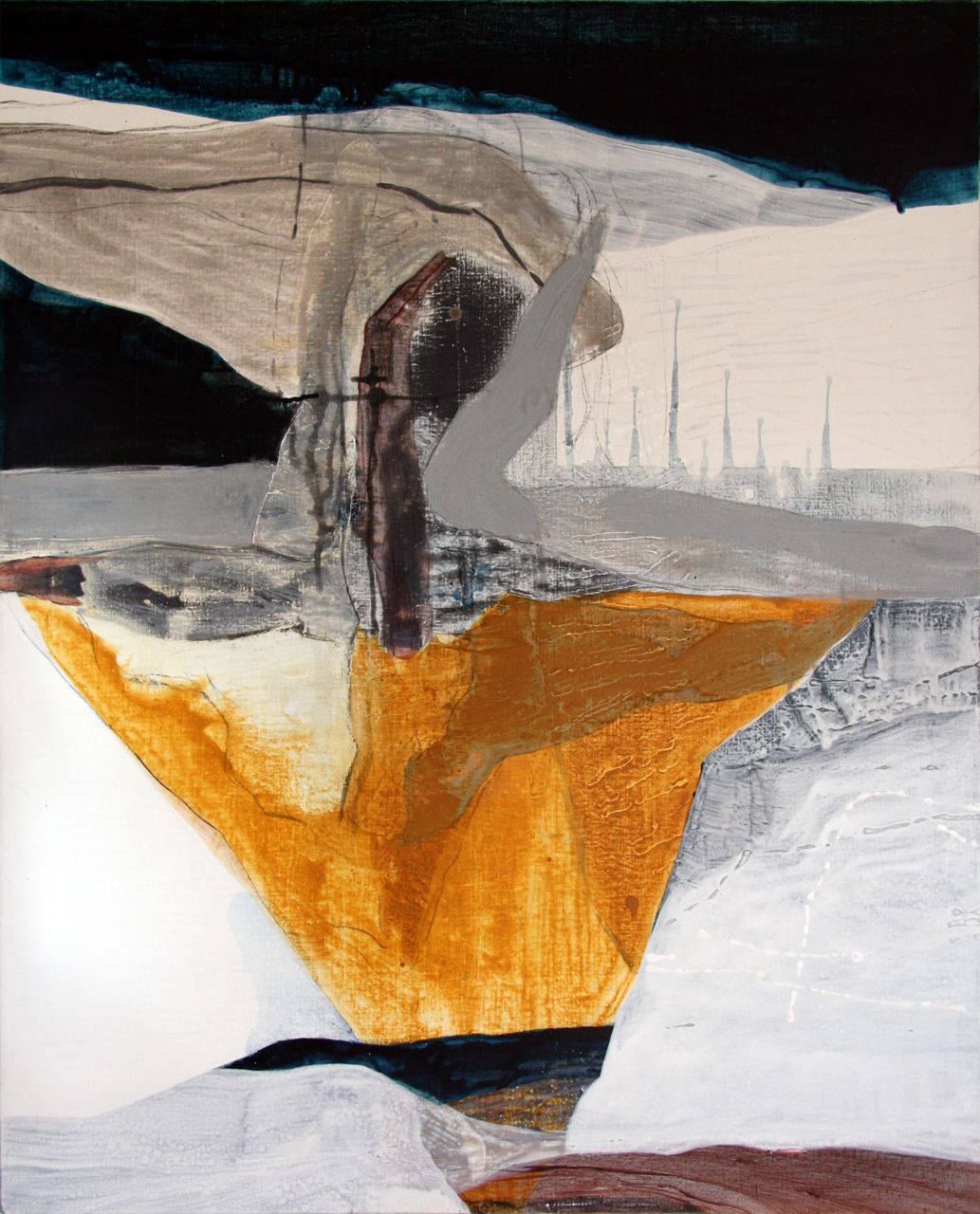
Yellow', acrylic on canvas, 101 x 81 cm, 2008

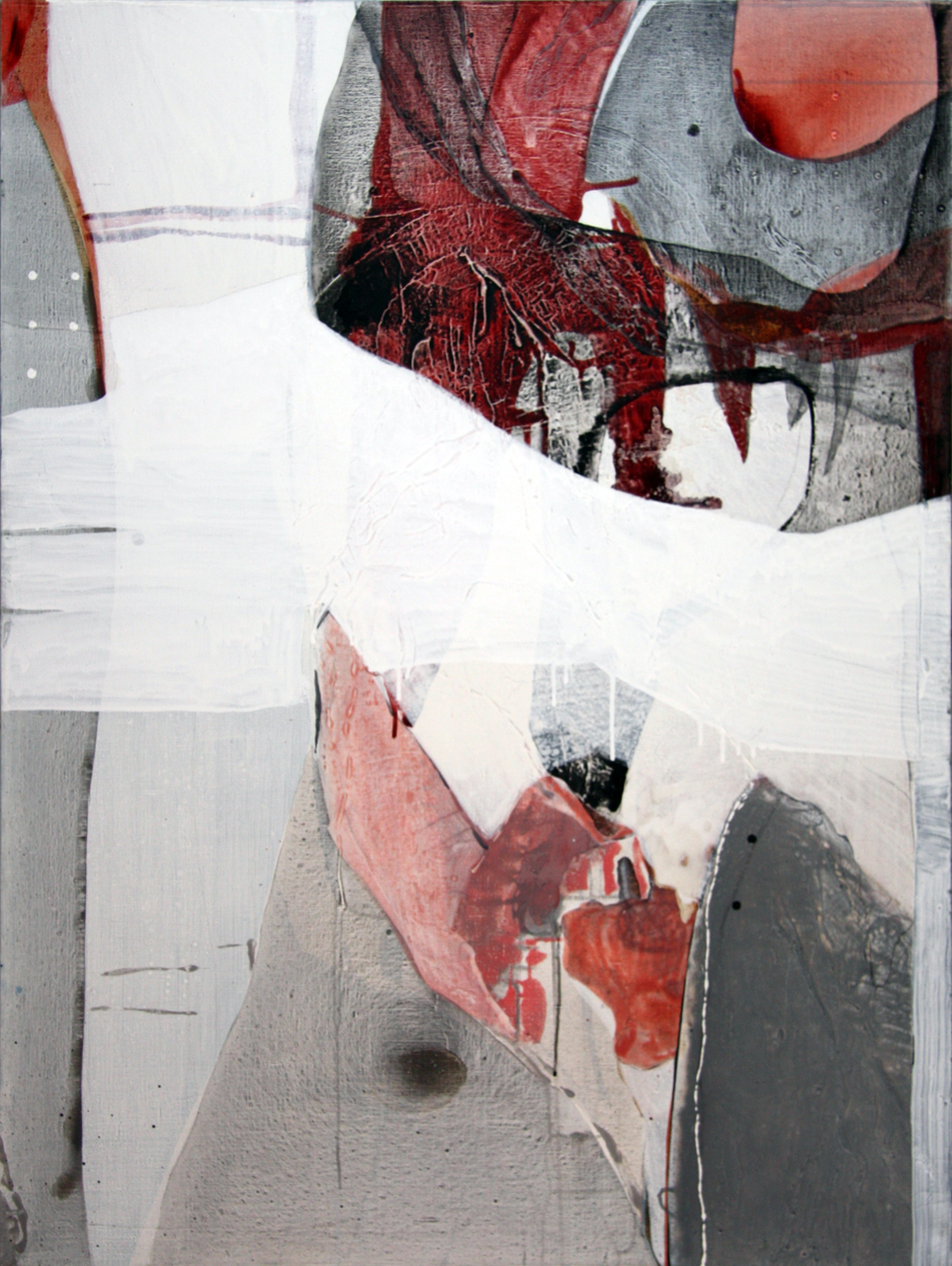
Close Being I, acrylic on canvas, 140 x 105 cm, 2012

For Marian Volráb, glass and painting become a means of expressing hidden moods, intimate confessions of experiencing a whole spectrum of feelings, from melancholy and hopelessness to humility before the greatness of the things of the universe that transcend man. His works have a distinctly meditative character and seek to evoke the ability to stop and perceive things that get lost in the hustle and bustle of everyday life.

=== Representation in public collections ===
- National Gallery in Prague
- Victoria and Albert Museum London
- Museum Kunstpalast, Glasmuseum Hentrich, Düsseldorf
- Gallerie Internationale du Verre, Biot, France
- Museum of East Bohemia in Pardubice
- North Bohemian Museum in Liberec
- Collection of the Czech Savings Bank
- Collection of the Intergalsssymposia Nový Bor Lemberk Castle
- RPG Foundation, India

=== Realization ===
- Restaurant Madrid, Prague, cut stained glass 11 m^{2}
- Czech National Bank Main Building in Prague (with Vladimíra Tesařová)
- Entrance to the Golden Goose Gallery Prague (with Ales Vašícek)

=== Exhibitions ===
==== Solo ====
- 1994 Marian Volráb - Eliška Rožátová, Stodola Gallery, Český Krumlov
- 1995 Meeting of Two Ways, Karlovy Vary Museum, Karlovy Vary,(M. Volráb and E.Rožátová)
- 1998 Marian Volráb, Gallery Půda, Lomnice nad Popelkou
- 1999 Jan Jelen, Marian Volráb, Glass, paintings drawings, City Gallery, Kladno, IPB Bank, Prague
- 2003 Meeting, Kamenický Šenov, (M. Volráb, P.Werner, V.Klein, I.Mareš, F.Janák)
- 2005 Marian Volráb: New Work, Studio Glass Gallery, London
- 2008 Marian Volráb: Paintings and Glass Objects, Gallery of Modern Art in Roudnice nad Labem
- 2009 Marian Volráb: Paintings and Glass Objects, Museum of East Bohemia in Pardubice
- 2021 Marian Volráb: Glass and Paintings, Glass Museum Kamenický Šenov

==== Collective ====
- 1990 The International Exhibition of Glass, Kanazawa, Japan
- 1991 The General Czechoslovak Exhibition, Prague Exhibition Centre

4. International Glass Symposium, Nový Bor
Glass Studio of the Academy of Fine Arts 1982-1990, Mánes, Prague
Glass Prize Prague '91, Mánes, Prague

- 1992 Talentbörse, Handwerkmesse, Munich

Constellations, House of Art Brno
Sklodola, Stodola Gallery, Český Krumlov

- 1993 Galerie Vetro, Frankfurt am Main

Glass now 15th, Yamaha, Japan
Symposium of plate glass, Glavunion Teplice, Regional Museum Teplice
Fascination Glass, Gewerbemusum Winterthur, Winterthur
Bohemia Cristal, Real Fábrica de Cristales de la Granja, Segovia

- 1994 Paintings, Glass, Sculptures, Museum of Glass and Jewellery, Jablonec nad Nisou

Glass Now 16th, Yamaha, Japan
Prag Glaskunst, Historischen Residenz Bamberg

- 2000/2001 Transfiguration of Light: Czech Contemporary Glass Sculptures, Japan.
- 2001/2003 Stanislav Libensky and His Pupils, National Technical Museum Prague (2001), Taiwan (2002), New York (2003)
- 2002 International Symposium of Engraved Glass, Kamenický Šenov
- 2004/2005 Expo 2005 Aichi: Captured Light and Space: Czech Contemporary Glass: V zajetí světla a prostor, Nostický palác, Prague, Toyama, Tokyo
- 2006 Coburger Glaspreis 2006, Museum der Veste Coburg

Light and Glass, 150 years of the Secondary Vocational School of Glassmaking in Kamenický Šenov, UPM Prague
1 + 2 + 8, Kopecký School, Waldes Museum, Prague
'1 + 2 + 8, Glass, paintings, objects, installations, Galerie Deset, Prague

- 2007 Glass, Paintings, Prints, Waldes Museum, Prague

The International Exhibition of Glass, Kanazawa 2007, Kanazawa
Glassmakers of Mánes and their guests, Galerie Diamant, Prague

- 2009 Crossing borders, Glasmuseet Ebeltoft, Ebeltoft
- 2009 FIGURE: The Rubicon Group, Galerie Diamant, Prague
- 2009 Rubikon: Glass, paintings, graphics, Galerie Aspekt, Brno
- 2012 Place in Time, Synagogue on Palmovka, Prague
- 2012 SOFA New York?
- 2013 Tschechisches Studioglas II, gallery f2, Kunsthalle Talstrasse
- 2015 Glaskunst aus dem RUBIKON, Glasmuseum Frauenau
- 2015 Glass - Vladimír Kopecký & his school, MA'MA Club Gallery, Ostrava
- 2021/2022 Affected by Storm and Calm, Portheimka Museum of Glass, Prague

== Literature ==
=== Catalogues ===
- Marian Volráb, Eliška Rožátová, Sklodola Gallery, Český Krumlov 1994
- Alena Vlasáková (Volrábová): Marian Volráb, Studio JB (Bárta & Bárta), Lomnice nad Popelkou 1998
- Miroslava Hlaváčková: Marian Volráb: paintings and glass objects, cat. 44 p., Gallery of Modern Art in Roudnice nad Labem 2008, ISBN 9788085053746

=== Publications ===
- Medková J. et al., Correlations, Glass Sculpture and Stained Glass, cat. 102 p., Brno House of Art 1992 ISBN 9788070090459
- Who is Who in Contemporary Glass Art, Joachim Waldrich Verlag, München 1993, p. 590 ISBN 3-929554-00-3
- Petrová S., Czech Glass, 283 p., Gallery, spol. s r.o. (Jaroslav Kořán), Prague 2001 ISBN 80-86010-44-9
- Agnus M. et al., 3. mezinárodní sympozium rytého skla Kamenický Šenov 2002 / 3rd International Symposium of Engraved Glass, 2002, cat. 119 p., Association of Engraved Glass Symposium, Kamenický Šenov 2002
- Rous J, 1 + 2 + 8 - Kopeckého škola / School of Vladimír Kopecký, cat. 44 p., Academy of Arts, Architecture and Design in Prague 2006
