= Tanel =

Male given name

- Gender: Male
- Name day: 11 December

Origin
- Region of origin: Estonia

Tanel is a male given name of Estonian origin. It is a cognate of the name Daniel. Individuals bearing the name Tanel include:

- Tanel Ingi (born 1976), Estonian actor
- Tanel Joamets (born 1968), Estonian pianist
- Tanel Kangert (born 1987), Estonian road bicycle racer
- Tanel Kerikmäe (1969-2025), Estonian lawyer
- Tanel Kiik (born 1989), Estonian politician
- Tanel Kurbas (born 1988), Estonian professional basketball player
- Tanel Laanmäe (born 1989), Estonian javelin thrower
- Tanel Leok (born 1985), Estonian motocross racer
- Tanel Padar (born 1980), Estonian singer
- Tanel Rander (born 1980), Estonian artist, curator and writer
- Tanel Sokk (born 1985), Estonian professional basketball player
- Tanel Talve (born 1976), Estonian journalist, radio and television presenter and politician
- Tanel Tammet (born 1965), Estonian computer scientist, professor, software engineer and politician
- Tanel Tammik (born 2002), Estonian footballer
- Tanel Tein (born 1978), Estonian basketball player
- Tanel Toom (born 1982), Estonian Oscar nominated director, screenwriter
- Tanel Tuhal (born 1967), Estonian architect
- Tanel Veenre (born 1977), Estonian jewellery artist and designer
- Tanel Visnap (born 1992), Estonian track and field athlete
