= Sharon Massey =

American artist, jewellery designer

- Born: 1977; Winston-Salem, North Carolina
- Known for: Jewellery designer
- Website: sharon-massey.com

Sharon Massey (born 1977, in Winston-Salem, North Carolina) is an American artist known for jewellery design. She attended Winthrop University and East Carolina University. She is located in Pennsylvania. Massey was the recipient of the 2009 Art Jewelry Forum (AJF) Young Artist Award. Her work is in the collection of the Victoria and Albert Museum. Her work, Touch (in the time of corona), was acquired by the Smithsonian American Art Museum as part of the Renwick Gallery's 50th Anniversary Campaign.
