= Masters W45 800 metres world record progression =

This is the progression of world record improvements of the 800 metres W45 division of Masters athletics.

Key

Incomplete information Pending

Hand	Auto	Athlete	Nationality	Birthdate	Location	Date
	2:02.82	Yekaterina Podkopayeva	Russia	11.06.1952	Moscow	11.06.1998
	2:13.38	Rita Windbrake	Germany	28.07.1945	Bad Oeynhausen	24.08.1990
	2:18.52	Godelieve Roggeman	Belgium	30.04.1940	Rome	24.06.1985
2:19.2		Anne McKenzie	South Africa	28.07.1925	Greater Point	13.11.1970
