= Tiner =

Tiner is a surname. Notable people with the surname include:

- Hugh M. Tiner (1908–1981), American academic administrator
- John Tiner (born 1957), British businessman

== See also ==
- Tinel
