= Volenice (Příbram District) =

- Municipality
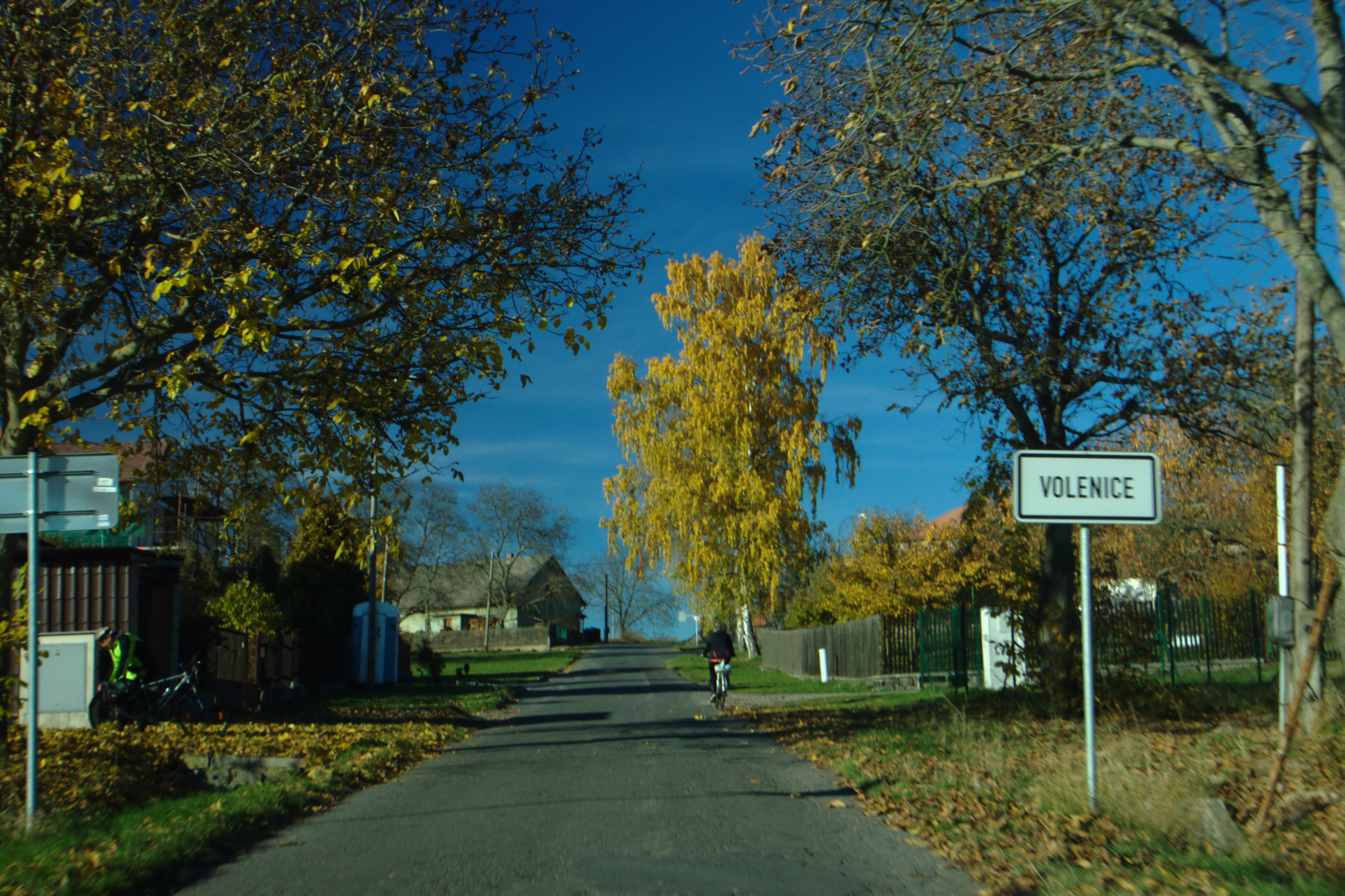
- Entrance to Volenice

- Location in the Czech Republic
- Coordinates: 49°32′52″N 13°53′1″E
- Country: Czech Republic
- Region: Central Bohemian
- District: Příbram
- First mentioned: 1484

Area
  - Total: 10.42 km^{2} (4.02 sq mi)
- Elevation: 561 m (1,841 ft)

Population (2026-01-01)
  - Total: 376
  - Density: 36.1/km^{2} (93.5/sq mi)
- Time zone: UTC+1 (CET)
  - Summer (DST): UTC+2 (CEST)
- Postal code: 262 72
- Website: www.volenice.cz

Volenice is a municipality and village in Příbram District in the Central Bohemian Region of the Czech Republic. It has about 400 inhabitants.

== Administrative division ==
Volenice consists of four municipal parts (in brackets population according to the 2021 census):

- Volenice (112)
- Bubovice (205)
- Nouzov (4)
- Pročevily (32)

== Demographics ==
Historical population
Year	Pop.	±%
1869	770	—
1880	728	−5.5%
1890	728	+0.0%
1900	750	+3.0%
1910	756	+0.8%
1921	803	+6.2%
1930	669	−16.7%
1950	505	−24.5%
1961	511	+1.2%
1970	446	−12.7%
1980	413	−7.4%
1991	343	−16.9%
2001	369	+7.6%
2011	379	+2.7%
2021	353	−6.9%
Source: Censuses

== Notable people ==
- Marian Volráb (born 1961), glass artist and painter
