= Athletics at the 2025 Summer Deaflympics =

Deaflympics event

- Venue: Komazawa Olympic Park Stadium; Oi Central Seaside Park (hammer throw); Tokyo Expressway (marathon)
- Dates: 17–25 November 2025
- Competitors: ? in 43 events (22 M , 20 W, 1 X)

Athletics at the 2025 Summer Deaflympics were held from 17 to 25 November 2025 in Tokyo, Japan. Three different venues were used, which were Komazawa Olympic Park Stadium for most of the track and field events, Oi Central Seaside Park for hammer throw and Tokyo Expressway for marathon races.

== Medal table ==
* Host nation (Japan)

Rank	NDSC	Gold	Silver	Bronze	Total
–	Individual Neutral Athletes	7	6	3	16
1	Kenya	5	6	4	15
2	Japan*	5	3	3	11
3	Ukraine	4	6	4	14
4	Estonia	3	0	0	3
5	Mexico	2	1	0	3
5	Portugal	2	1	0	3
7	Croatia	2	0	0	2
7	France	2	0	0	2
9	United States	1	2	2	5
10	Germany	1	2	1	4
10	Sweden	1	2	1	4
12	Lithuania	1	2	0	3
13	Colombia	1	1	5	7
14	Cuba	1	1	0	2
15	Ecuador	1	0	1	2
15	Kazakhstan	1	0	1	2
15	Turkey	1	0	1	2
18	Hungary	1	0	0	1
18	Italy	1	0	0	1
20	China	0	3	8	11
21	Poland	0	2	4	6
22	Chinese Taipei	0	2	0	2
23	Finland	0	1	0	1
23	Israel	0	1	0	1
23	Netherlands	0	1	0	1
26	Slovenia	0	0	3	3
27	Czech Republic	0	0	1	1
27	South Korea	0	0	1	1
Totals (28 entries)		43	43	43	129

== Medalists ==
Note: 2 Woman Events (3000 metres steeplechase and Pole vault) not played.

=== Men ===
Event	Gold		Silver		Bronze	
100 metres	Tanel Visnap; Estonia	10.58 DR	Simon Sharapo; Sweden	10.61	Takuma Sasaki; Japan	10.63
200 metres	Tanel Visnap; Estonia	21.54	Maki Yamada; Japan	21.61	Simon Sharapo; Sweden	21.63
400 metres	Maki Yamada; Japan	47.61	Oskar Golebiowski; Poland	47.93	Diego Alvarez; Colombia	48.09
800 metres	Elikana Rono; Kenya	1:53.02	Kousei Higuchi; Japan	1:53.22	Dalibor Ťulák; Czech Republic	1:53.33
1500 metres	James Mwanza; Kenya	3:49.61	Elikana Rono; Kenya	3:50.22	Aliaksandr Charniak; Individual Neutral Athletes	3:56.77
5000 metres	Ian Wambui; Kenya	13:52.83 DWR DR	James Mwanza; Kenya	14:15.28	Nelson Rotich; Kenya	14:43.35
10,000 metres	Ian Wambui; Kenya	29:19.56	David Kipkogei; Kenya	29:27.63	Xu Kuantian; China	30:04.83
110 metres hurdles	Yasin Süzen; Turkey	14.33	Jarvis Anderson; United States	14.79	Wang Yingchang; China	15.41
400 metres hurdles	Emerson Chala; Ecuador	51.96	Oskar Golebiowski; Poland	53.14	Jarvis Anderson; United States	54.22
3000 metres steeplechase	Lucas Wanjiru; Kenya	9:06.95	Jacob Kipkemoi; Kenya	9:09.16	Xu Kuantian; China	9:09.88
4 x 100 metres relay	Japan; Hayato Okamoto; Kosuke Tominaga; Shogo Sakata; Takuma Sasaki	41.22	United States; Gareth Ashton; Jarvis Anderson; Eric Gregory; Taylor Koss	41.69	Colombia; J. E. Fernandez; Ruben Casadiego; Diego Alvarez; Gian Marco Andrade	42.15
4 x 400 metres relay	Japan; Yoshifumi Adachi; Yusuke Murata; Taichi Araya; Maki Yamada	3:17.00	Colombia; Roberto Mosquera; Janer Rosero; Diego Alvarez; Ruben Casadiego	3:18.97	Turkey; Islam Yildirim; Murat Ekinci; Murat Sacan; Yasin Suzen	3:19.03
Marathon	Otto Kingstedt; Sweden	2:16:10 DR	David Kiptum Kipkogei; Kenya	2:17:30	José Libardo Chasoy; Colombia	2:23:50
High jump	Denis Fedorenkov; Individual Neutral Athletes	2.07 m	Raman Hralko; Individual Neutral Athletes	2.04 m	Bartosz Jan Brzezicki; Poland	1.92 m
Pole vault	Ardasher Mumindzhanov; Individual Neutral Athletes	4.45 m	Adam Nurpeissov; Israel	4.30 m	Hiroto Kitadani; Japan	4.10 m
Long jump	Tanel Visnap; Estonia	7.24 m	Yaroslav Vodopianov; Ukraine	7.18 m	Jeong Seung-yun; South Korea	7.16 m
Triple jump	Jarvis Anderson; United States	15.28 m	Aliaksandr Maistrenka; Individual Neutral Athletes	14.75 m	Raman Hralko; Individual Neutral Athletes	14.71 m
Shot put	Mindaugas Jurkša; Lithuania	17.07 m	Yytenis Ivaškevičius; Lithuania	16.93 m	Oskar Kokoszewski; Poland	16.86 m
Discus throw	Masateru Yugami; Japan	58.93 m DR	Mazvydas Paurys; Lithuania	57.83 m	Li Yulin; China	53.51 m
Hammer throw	Riki Toyama; Japan	60.19 m	Masatoshi Morimoto; Japan	56.04 m	Takamasa Ishida; Japan	55.51 m
Javelin throw	Matteo Masetti; Italy	67.44 m	Theodor Thor; Sweden	63.87 m	Li Shulin; China	56.69 m
Decathlon	Ardasher Mumindzhanov; Individual Neutral Athletes	6502 pts	Wei Yu-Tze; Chinese Taipei	5985 pts	Nursultan Kuldeyev; Kazakhstan	5725 pts

=== Women ===
Event	Gold		Silver		Bronze	
100 metres	Pamera Losange; France	11.95	Elaine Den Exter; Netherlands	12.08	Tessa Lange; Germany	12.19
200 metres	Pamera Losange; France	23.87 DWR DR	Tessa Lange; Germany	24.65	Kristina Kiniaikina; Ukraine	24.72
400 metres	Viktoriia Aksenova; Individual Neutral Athletes	55.48	Kristina Kiniaikina; Ukraine	55.50	Solomiia Kuprych; Ukraine	57.75
800 metres	Margarida Da Silva; Portugal	2:10.38 DR	Iuliia Abubiakirova; Individual Neutral Athletes	2:10.64	Gao Na; China	2:11.69
1500 metres	Iuliia Abubiakirova; Individual Neutral Athletes	4:39.65	Margarida Da Silva; Portugal	4:40.60	Sharon Bitok; Kenya	4:43.65
5000 metres	Margarida Da Silva; Portugal	17:26.23	Iuliia Abubiakirova; Individual Neutral Athletes	17:26.78	Viola Jelimo; Kenya	17:26.83
10,000 metres	Lourdes Juarez; Mexico	36:17.07	Sara-Elise Ruokonen; Finland	37:13.45	Serah Kimani; Kenya	37:24.37
100 metres hurdles	Nikolett Gal; Hungary	14.27	Hsu Le; Chinese Taipei	14.40	Leja Glojnarič; Slovenia	15.13
400 metres hurdles	Viktoriia Aksenova; Individual Neutral Athletes	1:00.74	Danae Nieves Medina; Mexico	1:04.88	Olivia Coopwood; United States	1:05.67
4 x 100 metres relay	Germany; Sheila Schlechter; Delia Gaede; Tessa Lange; Jelisa Graef	47.06	Ukraine; Yuliia Matviievska; Yuliia Shapoval; Solomiia Kuprych; Kristina Kiniaikina	47.78	Poland; Alicja Biedna; Natalia Nowaczyk; Sara Plewczynska; Martyna Boguszewicz	48.97
4 x 400 metres relay	Ukraine; Kateryna Potapenko; Yuliia Shapoval; Solomiia Kuprych; Kristina Kiniaikina	3:54.98	Germany; Fiona Proba; Delia Gaede; Tessa Lange; Jelisa Graef	4:02.09	Colombia; Lina Guerrero Garces; Thalyana Tarapues; Valentina Tovar; Erika-Nataly Beltran	4:06.86
Marathon	Lourdes Juarez; Mexico	2:49:30 DR	Yang Chunhua; China	2:57:30	Agata Kosztowny; Poland	3:00:31
High jump	Faina Meirmanova; Kazakhstan	1.79 m	Hanna Suravets; Individual Neutral Athletes	1.76 m	Leja Glojnarič; Slovenia	1.67 m
Long jump	Suslaidy Rivero; Cuba	6.11 m	Dziyana Barsukova; Individual Neutral Athletes	5.79 m	Yuliia Matviievska; Ukraine	5.73 m
Triple jump	Yuliia Matviievska; Ukraine	13.07 m	Suslaidy Rivero; Cuba	12.60 m	Dziyana Barsukova; Individual Neutral Athletes	12.34 m
Shot put	Daniela Colmenares; Colombia	14.35 m	Nataliia Ursulenko; Ukraine	13.40 m	Yuliia Kysylova; Ukraine	13.33 m
Discus throw	Mia Nekic; Croatia	46.23 m	Fu Fang; China	44.97 m	Liu Li; China	42.17 m
Hammer throw	Rymma Filimoshkina; Ukraine	60.81 m	Yuliia Kysylova; Ukraine	58.00 m	Zhan Yafei; China	55.14 m
Javelin throw	Laura Štefanac; Croatia	49.77 m	Li Lei; China	44.67 m	Ariel Contreras; Ecuador	43.95 m
Heptathlon	Dziyana Prudnikava; Individual Neutral Athletes	4665 pts	Kateryna Potapenko; Ukraine	4626 pts	Leja Glojnarič; Slovenia	4595 pts

=== Mixed ===
Event	Gold		Silver		Bronze	
400 metres relay	Ukraine; Dmytro Rudenko; Serhii Drach; Solomiia Kuprych; Kristina Kiniaikina	3:33.91 DR	Kenya; Simon Menza; Isaac Tongi; Linet Fwamba; Beryl Wamira	3:38.05	Colombia; Roberto Mosquera; Diego Alvarez; Lina Guerrero Garces; Erika-Nataly Martinez	3:40.65
