= Rita Windbrake =

German athlete (born 1945)

Personal information
- Born: 28 July 1945 (age 80) Bornheim
- Years active: 1965-1993

Sport
- Sport: Athletics
- Club: ASV Köln
Medal record
Women's Athletics
Representing West Germany
Event / 1st / 2nd / 3rd; Deaflympics / 14 / 5 / 4
Deaflympics
Gold medal – first place	Belgrade 1969	400m
Gold medal – first place	Belgrade 1969	800m
Gold medal – first place	Malmo 1973	1500m
Gold medal – first place	Malmo 1973	400m
Gold medal – first place	Malmo 1973	800m
Gold medal – first place	Bucharest 1977	400m
Gold medal – first place	Bucharest 1977	4 × 100m relay
Gold medal – first place	Bucharest 1977	800m
Gold medal – first place	Korn 1981	1500m
Gold medal – first place	Korn 1981	400m
Gold medal – first place	Korn 1981	800m
Gold medal – first place	Los Angeles 1985	1500m
Gold medal – first place	Los Angeles 1985	3000m
Gold medal – first place	Los Angeles 1985	800m
Silver medal – second place	Bucharest 1977	1500m
Silver medal – second place	Bucharest 1977	4 × 400m relay
Silver medal – second place	Korn 1981	4 × 100m relay
Silver medal – second place	Korn 1977	4 × 400m relay
Silver medal – second place	Los Angeles 1985	4 × 400m relay
Bronze medal – third place	Washington D.C 1965	4 × 100m relay
Bronze medal – third place	Belgrade 1969	4 × 100m relay
Bronze medal – third place	Malmo 1973	4 × 100m relay
Bronze medal – third place	Los Angeles 1985	4 × 100m relay
Representing Germany
Event / 1st / 2nd / 3rd; Deaflympics / 0 / 1 / 0
Silver medal – second place	Sofia 1993	1500m

Rita Windbrake (born 28 July 1945) is a former German deaf track and field athlete. She represented both West Germany and Germany at Deaflympics, and the World Deaf Championships.

Windbrake competed at the Deaflympics on seven occasions from 1965 to 1993.

Rita Windbrake is considered one of the greatest Deaflympic athletes of all time with a career record of 24 medals at the Deaflympics, including 14 gold medals.

In 1984, she won the German-American 1500 metres Deaf track meet.

Windbrake also holds several world records in athletics including 800 metres for women. Her records at the Deaflympic include 800 metres, 1000 metres, and 1500 metres.
