= Tanel Visnap =

Estonian athlete (born 1992)

Personal information
- Born: 23 September 1992 (age 33) Estonia

Sport
- Country: Estonia
- Sport: Track and field
- Event(s): 100 metres 200 metres High jump Long jump
Medal record
Men's athletics
Representing Estonia
Deaflympics
Gold medal – first place	2025 Tokyo	100 m
Gold medal – first place	2025 Tokyo	200 m
Gold medal – first place	2025 Tokyo	Long jump
Gold medal – first place	2021 Caxias do Sul	Long jump
Bronze medal – third place	2021 Caxias do Sul	High jump

Tanel Visnap (born 23 September 1992) is an Estonian athlete who specializes in sprinting and jumping events.

== Career ==
At the 2019 World Indoor Deaf Athletics Championships in Tallinn, Visnap won bronze medals in the long jump and heptathlon.

At the 2021 World Deaf Championships in Lublin, Poland, Visnap won two gold medals and one bronze. He won the 100 m race with a time of 10.54 and the 200 m race with a time of 21.46, which became new World Deaf Championships records. He also won the bronze medal in the long jump with a time of 7.00.

In 2022, he competed at the 2021 Summer Deaflympics in Caxias do Sul, Brazil, where he won the gold medal in the men's long jump with a personal best of 7.43. Visnap's result was the second highest ever at the Deaflympics; only Dean Barton-Smith of New Zealand (7.63 in Christchurch, 1989) has jumped further. He also won the bronze medal in the long jump.

In 2023, Visnap won the gold medal at the Estonian Athletics Championships with a time of 7.42, and was third in the 100 m race with a time of 10.85.

In November 2025, Visnap competed at the Summer Deaflympics and won the gold medal in the 100 m, 200 m and long jump events.
