= Tanel Veenre =

Estonian jewellery artist

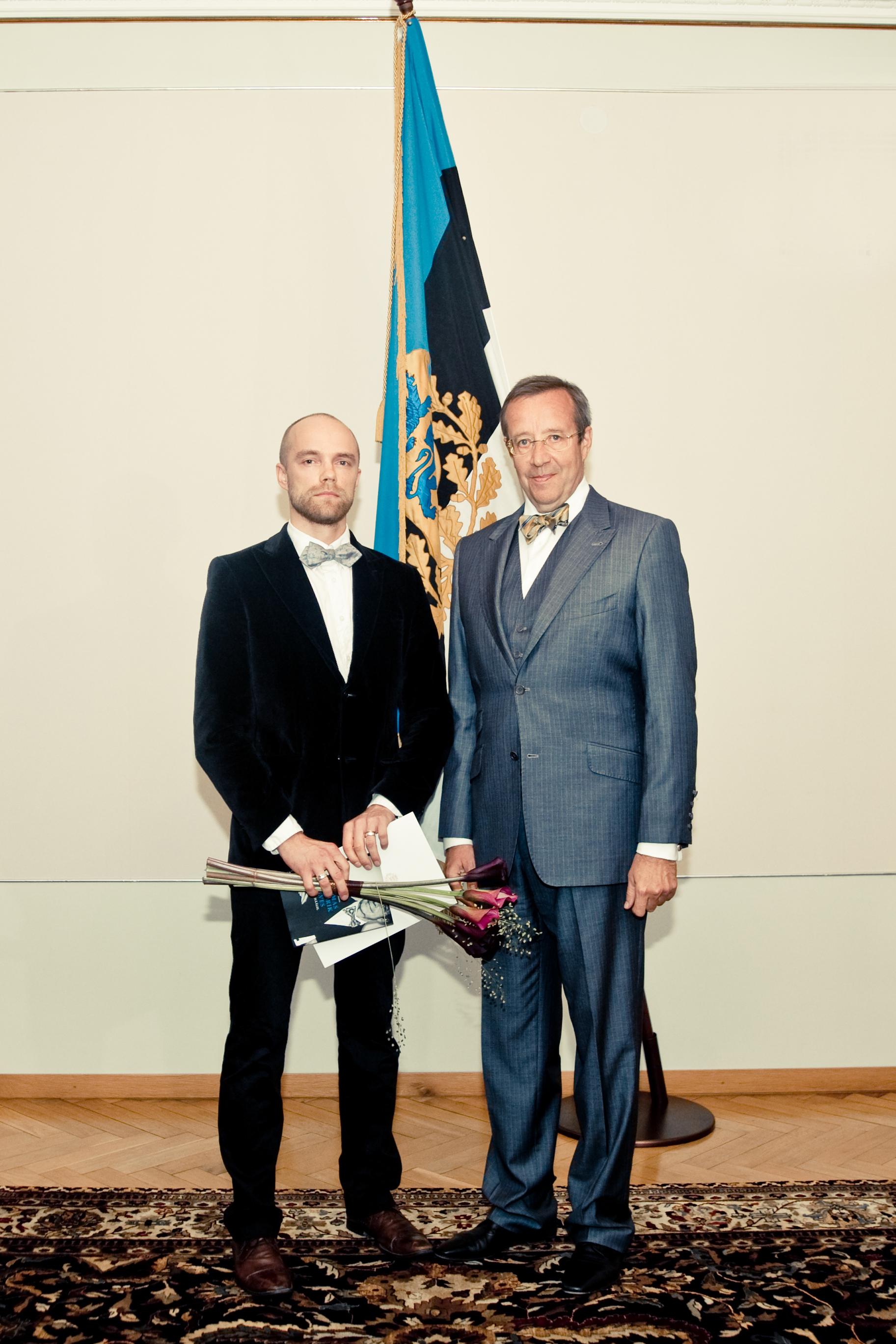
- Tanel Veenre (left) receiving Young Cultural Figure Award in 2012 from Toomas Hendrik Ilves
- Born: 5 May 1977 (age 49); Tallinn, then part of Estonian SSR, Soviet Union
- Website: http://tanelveenre.com https://tvj.ee

Tanel Veenre (born 5 May 1977) is an Estonian jewellery artist and designer of brand Tanel Veenre.

== Life ==
Tanel Veenre was born in Tallinn and grew up in a family of artists and musicians. He studied under Kadri Mälk at the Estonian Academy of Arts where he graduated in 2005 after having taken part in an exchange program in Gerrit Rietveld Academy.

== Work ==
Tanel Veenre has participated since 1994 in at least 300 events between, fairs, shows, art gallery exhibitions and fashion shows in Estonia, Germany, United States of America, Spain, Portugal, Italy, Taiwan, China, Israel, Finland, Sweden, Brazil, Mexico etc. His body adornments have enhanced the windows of Selfridges retail store in London. Tanel Veenre has been working as a fashion photographer (campaigns for Aldo Järvsoo, Monton, Ivo Nikkolo), journalist and editor (Muusa, Eesti Päevaleht, Eesti Ekspress). He has been giving lectures and workshops in Konstfack, China Academy of Art, Tainan National University of the Arts, Monterrey Institute of Technology and Higher Education, Shenkar College of Engineering and Design, Oslo National Academy of the Arts and in many other institutions. Since 2012 professor in Estonian Academy of Arts. Tanel Veenre is a board member of Art Jewelry Forum.

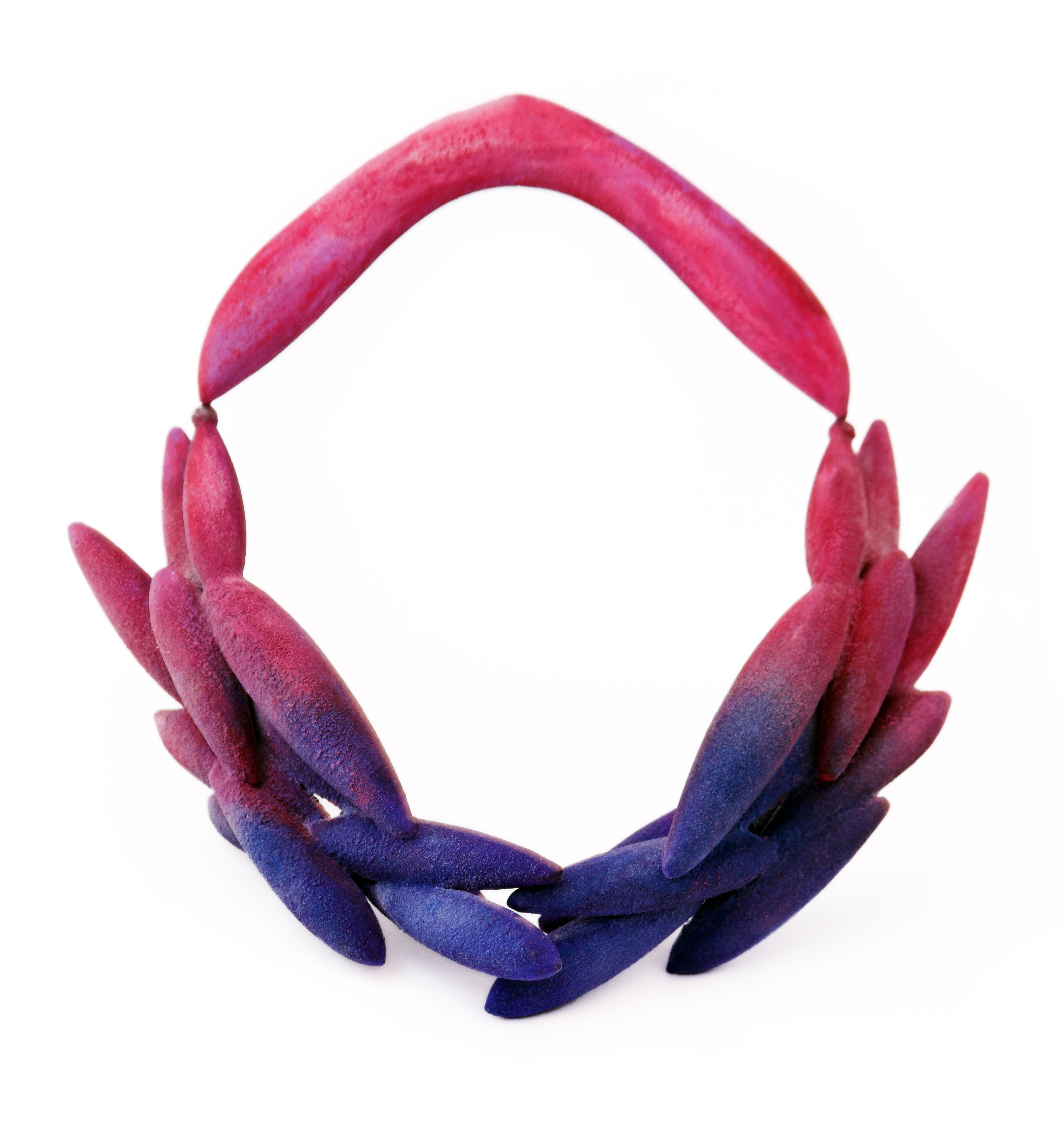
Necklace "Võidupärg"

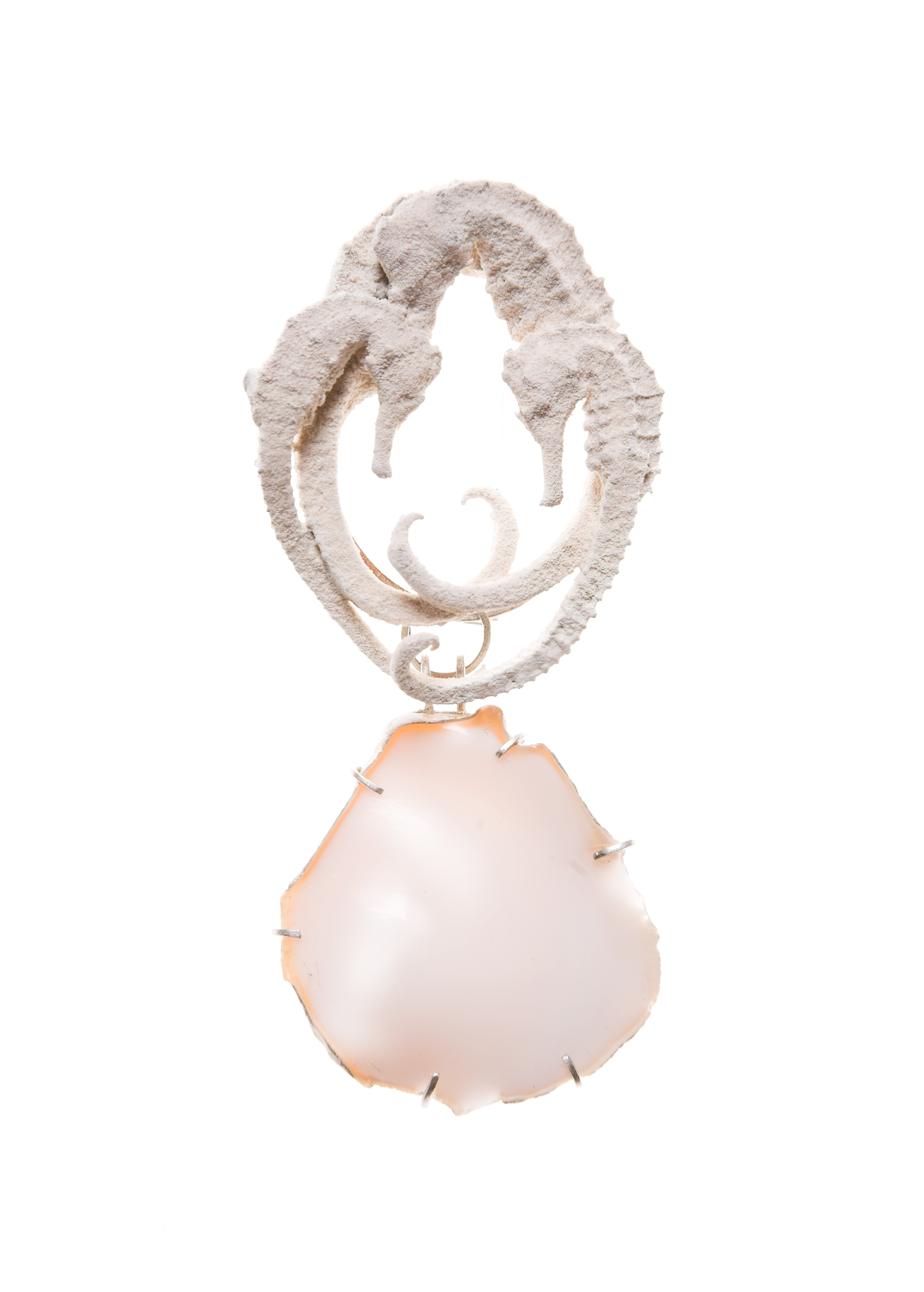
Brooch "Palindrome l"

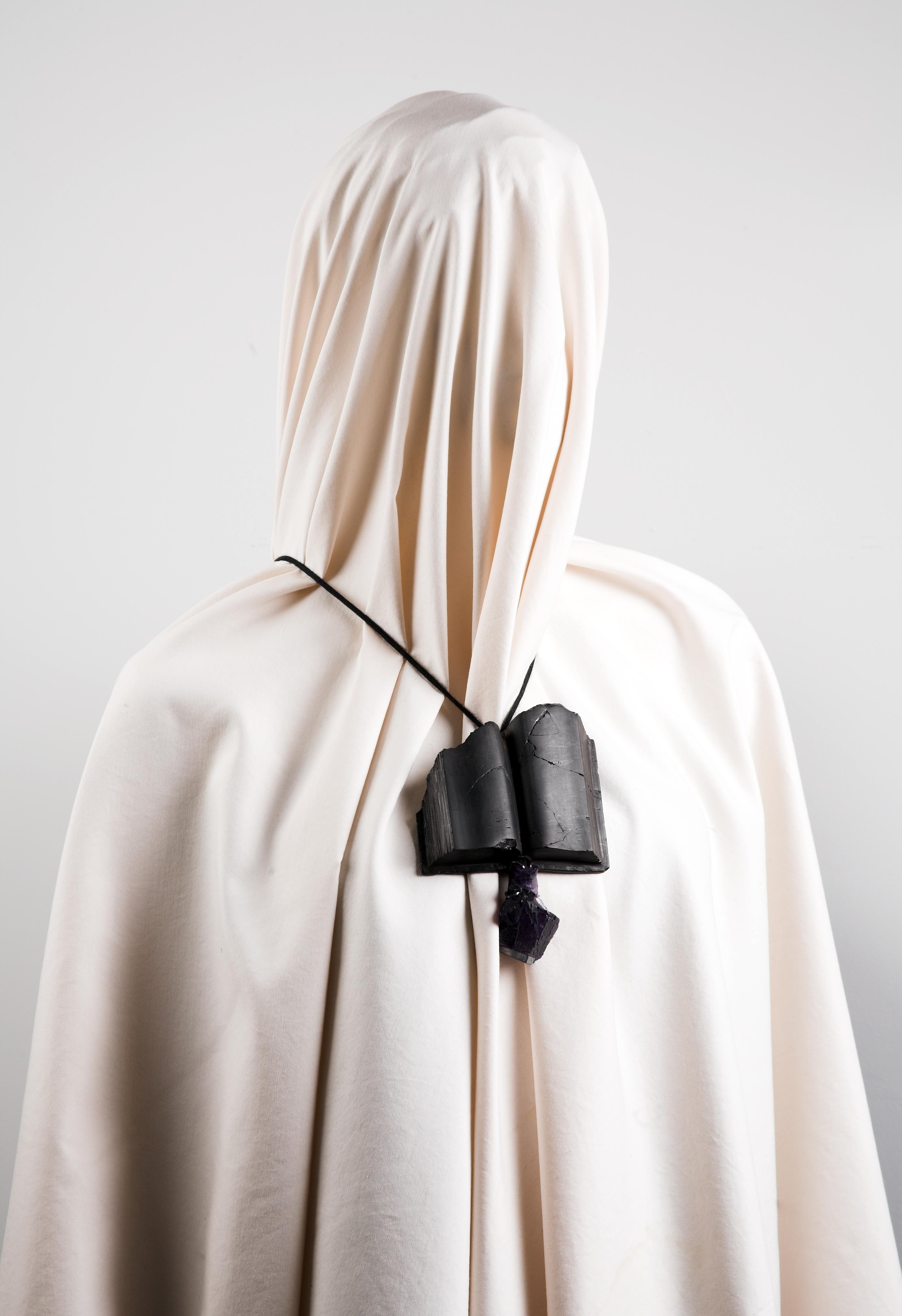
"Book of Fears"

== Galleries ==
Tanel Veenre is represented by the following galleries:

- Ornamentum in Hudson NY
- Platina in Stockholm
- RA in Amsterdam
- Putti in Riga
- Alice Floriano Gallery

Alice Floriano Gallery

== Monographies ==
- "Jewel. Hesitations in Art / Ehe. Kahtlused kunsti kujul", 2009
- "Handful / Käeulatuses", 2015

== Awards ==
- National Cultural Award (2016)
- International Fashion Showcase, best display and curating, London Fashion Week (2014)
- Young Cultural Figure Award (2012)
- Kristjan Raud Art Award (2010)

== Personal life ==
Tanel Veenre was in a long-term relationship with fashion artist Aldo Järvsoo. They publicly confirmed their separation in 2024. They have two children—a twin boy and girl—through a co-parenting agreement arranged with their mother.
