= Nele Alder-Baerens =

German long-distance runner

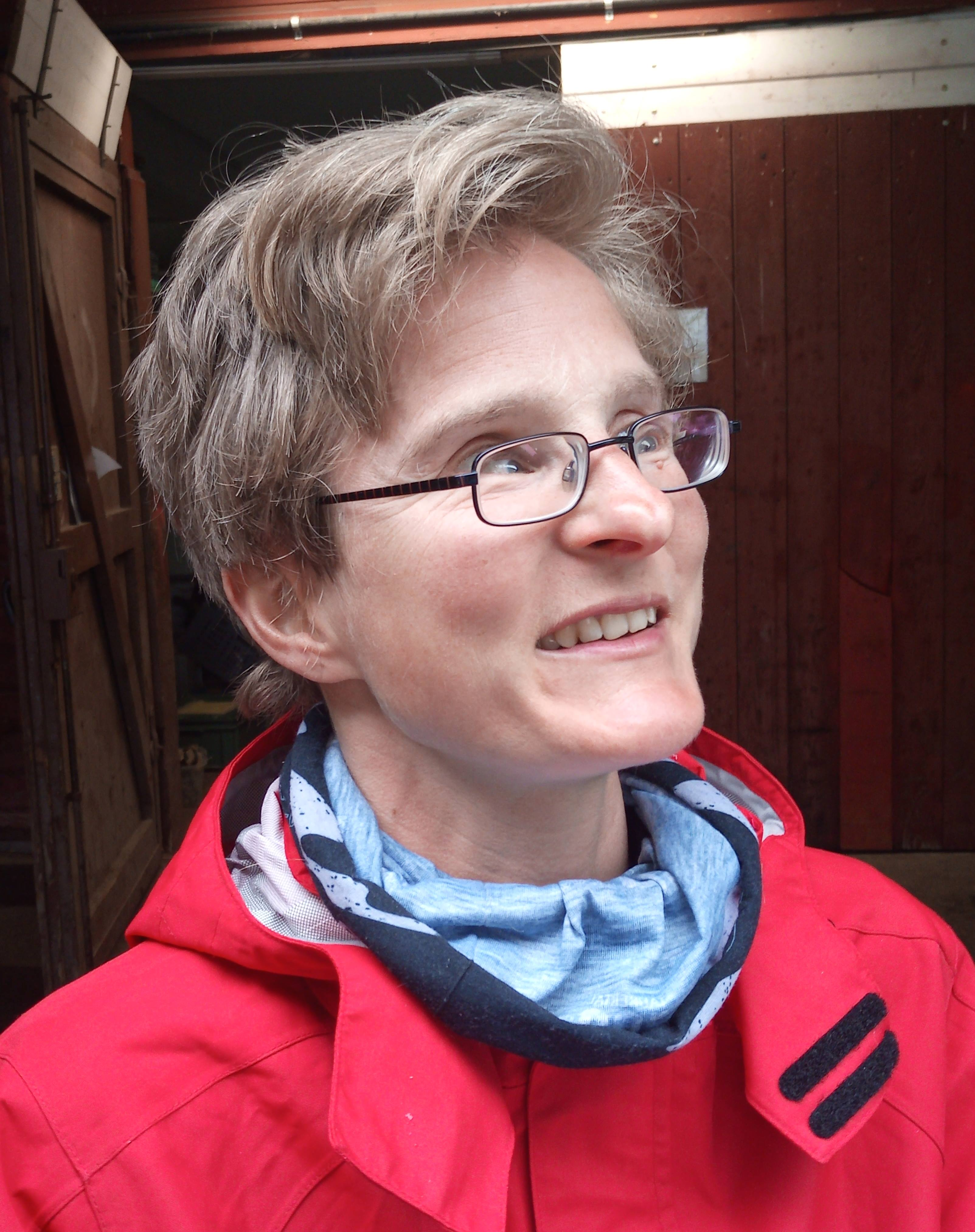
- Alder-Baerens in 2019

Personal information
- Nationality: German
- Born: April 1, 1978 (age 48) Berlin, Germany
- Height: 161 cm (5 ft 3 in)
- Weight: 45 kg (99 lb)

Sport
- Country: Germany
- Sport: middle-distance running, marathon, ultramarathon
- Club: Ultra Sport Club Marburg
Medal record
Representing Germany
Women's Athletics
Deaflympics
Gold medal – first place	2005 Melbourne	5000m
Gold medal – first place	2017 Samsun	Marathon
Silver medal – second place	2001 Rome	800m
Silver medal – second place	2017 Samsun	10000m
Bronze medal – third place	2005 Melbourne	10000m
IAU World Championships
Silver medal – second place	2016 Doha	50km
Silver medal – second place	2018 Sveti Martin	100km
Silver medal – second place	2019 Albi	24Hr

Nele Alder-Baerens (born 1 April 1978) is a German distance runner and marathon runner. She is regarded as one of the best long-distance runners from Germany to have represented the nation at the Deaflympics. She has represented Germany at the Deaflympics in 1997, 2001, 2005, 2017 and 2022 and has won five medals in her career, including two gold medals. She is also the defending champion in the women's marathon at the Deaflympics. Alder-Baerens also currently holds few deaf world records in the women's Athletics.

== Biography ==
Nele Alder-Baerens was born on the 1 April 1978 in Berlin. She is very short sighted with twelve dioptres due to early birth and deaf. Despite her disability with both blindness and deafness, she took the sport of Athletics and also competed in the German National Athletics Championships. In 2000, she was awarded the Junior Deaf Sportswoman of the Year award. She graduated from the Margarathe von Witzleben School which is located in Berlin.

== Career ==
Alder-Baerens made her Deaflympic debut at the 1997 Summer Deaflympics but did not win any medals. She won her first medal at the Deaflympics in 2001, where she won the silver medal in the women's 800 m individual event. She competed in the 2005 Summer Deaflympics and won the gold medal in the women's 5000 m event and bronze medal in the women's 10000 m event. In the 2017 Summer Deaflympics, she won her first Deaflympic medal for marathon event after winning the gold medal in the women's marathon event. In 2016, despite her disability she participated in the women's IAU 50 km World Championships and secured silver medal in the event which was held in Doha.

She was awarded the ICSD Deaf Sportswoman of the Year award in 2016 by the Comité International des Sports des Sourds. She was also nominated for the ICSD Deaf Sportswoman of the Year award in 2005.

Alder-Baerens also holds the world record in the ultramarathon 6H Road event with a record of 85.492 km distance. In 2019 at the 24-hour World Championship in Albi, France, she ran 254.288 km (158 miles) for a silver medal overall in the female competition for farthest distance covered in 24 hours. She was ahead of the next competitor by a little over four miles.

She took part at the 2021 Summer Deaflympics (held in May 2022) which also marked her fifth appearance at the competition since her debut in 1997. She fell short of a bronze medal finish to Kenya's Grancy Kandogar in the women's 10000 m race final after finishing at fourth place clocking 40:34.62 seconds.
