= Iris Eichenberg =

German contemporary artist, metalsmith

- Born: 1965 (age 60–61); Göttingen, Germany
- Known for: Metalsmithing, jewelry design
- Style: Contemporary

Iris Eichenberg (born 1965) is a German post-war, contemporary artist, metalsmith, and educator. She is head of the Metalsmithing Department at the Cranbook Academy of Art.

== Early life and education ==
Born Göttingen, Germany, in 1965, Eichenberg graduated from Gerrit Rietveld Academie in Amsterdam in 1994.

== Career ==
Eichenberg taught at the Gerrit Rietveld Academie beginning in 1996, and became head of the Jewelry Department from 2000–2007. She has been Artist in Residence and head of the Metalsmithing Department at Cranbrook Academy of Art in Bloomfield Hills, Michigan since 2006.

== Critical reception ==
The Cranbrook Museum of Art review of her work for her "Bend" exhibit noted it "...is renowned for its diverse collections and challenges to the definitions of craft and jewelry; the result is an unconventional retrospective of her twenty-five-year career told through a body of new work."

Of Eichenberg's art Dora Apel wrote that her works "convey a searching spirit that permeates Iris Eichenberg’s work, which often meditates on making home and finding our place in the world. Related in some way to the body, her constructions produce sensorial and emotional effects that stretch conventional boundaries to explore structures of feeling".

== Selected exhibits ==
Eichenberg's works are in permanent collections of the Museum of Arts and Design, the Rijksmuseum, the Metropolitan Museum of Art, the Stedelijk Museum Amsterdam, the Schmuck Museum Pforzheim, the Fondation National d’Art Contemporain in Paris, and the Museum of Fine Arts, Houston. Her group exhibitions at international venues have included the Victoria and Albert Museum, Museum of Art and Design, Fundacao Calouste Gulbenkian, CaixaForum, Frans Hals Museum, Sainsbury Centre for Visual Arts, and Museum Boymans van Beuningen.

=== Solo exhibits ===
- Perspex Hands Chatelaine, Metropolitan Museum of Art, 2007
- Pink Years Later, Ornamentum Gallery, 2009
- Strange Birds, Ornamentum Gallery, 2012
- X series, Cranberg Art Museum, 2014
- Bend, Cranberg Art Museum, 2014
- Real series, Ornamentum Gallery, 2015
- I Do Not Wish, Ornamentum Gallery, 2017
- Kein Ort Nirgends ("No Place Anywhere") and Moreland, Simone DeSousa Gallery, 2017
- The Domestic Plane: New Perspectives On Tabletop Art Objects, The Aldrich Contemporary Art Museum
- Useless Utility, Museum of Contemporary Art Detroit, 2019

=== Selected group exhibits ===
- "Collect", Saatchi Gallery, London, 2009
- "Setting the Table", Museum of Contemporary Art Detroit, 2011
- "MoreLand", Simone DeSousa Gallery, 2017
- "Handheld", Aldrich Contemporary Art Museum, 2018

== Awards ==
- 1994 — Gerrit Rietveld Academy Award
- 1999 — Artist in Residence, EKWC, s'-Hertogenbosch, Netherlands
- 1999 — Herbert Hofmann Prize, (Schmuckszene Munich)
- 1999, 2001 — Residencies: European Ceramic Center in Den Bosch
- 2000 — Artist Stimulation Award from the Amsterdam Fund for the Arts
- 2002, 2005 —Incentive Grants from the Netherlands Foundation for Visual Arts, Design and Architecture
