= Kiff Slemmons =

American metalsmith

Kiff Slemmons (born 1944) is an American metalsmith. She received her B.A. in Art and French at the University of Iowa, but is primarily known for her career in jewelry and metals. Slemmons currently resides in Chicago, Illinois. Her work is collected by many notable museums and personalities, including Smithsonian Design Museum, Metropolitan Museum of Art, The Victoria and Albert Museum and Robin Williams.

== Childhood and early life ==
Slemmons was born in Maxton, North Carolina, but grew up in Iowa. The child of a pharmacist and newspaper publisher, Slemmons developed a love of the printed word and the Linotype early in life.

=== Education ===
In 1962 Slemmons enrolled in Scripps College in Claremont, California for comparative literature, but left shortly for the Sorbonne in Paris, France in 1963. She completed her Bachelor of Arts degree in 1968 at the University of Iowa and later attended an eight-week metals program in Japan through Parsons The New School for Design in 1983.

== Works ==
Kiff Slemmons is an artist who creates sculptural jewelry in paper and metal. During a trip to Mexico, Slemmons saw the jewelry in Tomb 7 at Monte Albán and it sparked her interest in non-precious jewelry materials. Slemmon’s metal jewelry includes historical and literary references, using found objects, which she fabricates with metals.

Her own work includes historical and literary references, incorporating selected found objects, generally non-precious materials, which she fabricates into detailed pieces with silver and other metals. Slemmons expresses that three threads run through her work, "scale, the language of material and the idea of more than one to make one. She rejects the traditional valuation of jewelry based on the materials used, focusing instead on the ideas that go into each piece.

In the 2007 Oral Histories Interview with Slemmons conducted by Mija Riedel for the Archives of American Art, Smithsonian Institution, Riedel states, "Technique and form always followed your ideas, so it makes total sense that the ideas were often layered, in a literal sense." Slemmons clarifies, "It's a discourse that is, in fact, a kind of conversation, and the video artist Gary Hill, who I have quoted many times, has a very good line about that, that art belongs by right to an ongoing conversation between friends of the work, enemies of the work, and all those whose lives are informed and transformed by it. The series have a kind of flow to them, adding to that kind of conversation. Poetry has certainly been a huge influence, even if it's indirect. It's the way poetry works. It's the economy of poetry. Novels and stories and narrative are a kind of language, and they say something a certain way. It's more natural to me to say something in a poetic way, which is suggestive and has a kind of brevity and a kind of, almost, restraint or tension in what's not said than in what is said, even though sometimes it seems like I get very elaborate in what I make; it's not actually so simple."

In her exhibition The Thought of Things, Slemmons made jewelry that used parts of aged photographs, rulers, typewriters, and other found objects in order to elicit a direct personal response. Another series of works that question worth and value was the much talked-about Re:Pair and Imperfection. In the process of preparing the series, she asked some of her peers to give her pieces that are unfinished because they are unwanted or somehow flawed. She used thirty donated objects of varying materials in the exhibition, which included wearables and sculptures with ornate details. Her intention was to make the viewer question the nature of imperfection and contemplate the new meaning of unconventional repair.

Although much of Slemmons' work references her early life and the time spent at her father's newspaper office, incorporating pencils and text, some of the artist's most recent work uses ancient artifacts and pays homage to ancient artisans and the persistence of the human spirit.

In 2000, Slemmons was invited by artist Francisco Toledo to work with Oaxacan artisans in Mexico to create and design paper jewelry using paper made from native plants at Taller Arte Papel Oaxaca. Slemmons has been recognized for her work with Mexican artists making and designing paper jewelry, resulting in colorful and intricate pieces using traditional bead-making techniques and dyes from indigenous plants.

== Selected collections ==
- The Victoria and Albert Museum
- The Museum of Arts and Design
- The Renwick Gallery
- Mint Museum
- The Museum of Fine Arts, Houston
- The Museum of Fine Arts, Boston

== Selected exhibitions ==
- Paper as Protection and Gift/Recent Work by Kiff Slemmons, The Jewelry Library, New York, NY; Gallery Loupe, Montclair, NJ, 2019
- Kiff Slemmons: Collective Presence, Craft in America Gallery, Los Angeles, CA, 2018
- Kiff Slemmons + Arte Papel Vista Hermosa, CaSa (Centro de las Artes San Agustín), 20th Anniversary Arte Papel Vista Hermosa, San Agustín Etla, Oaxaca, Mexico, 2018
- Tools for Thought: Jewelry by Kiff Slemmons, Bradbury Art Museum, Arkansas State University, Jonesboro, AR, 2016
- Starting Points, Douglas Dawson Gallery, Chicago, IL; Heller Gallery through Gallery Loupe, Montclair, NJ, 2014
- Huesos, Gallery Loupe, Montclair, NJ, 2012
- Re:Pair and Imperfection, Chicago Cultural Center, Chicago, IL, 2006; Palo Alto Art Center, Palo Alto, CA, 2006; Philadelphia Art Alliance, Philadelphia, PA, 2007
- Ramona and Friends, Facèré Art Gallery, Seattle, WA, 2001
- The Thought of Things: Jewelry by Kiff Slemmons, Palo Alto Art Center, Palo Alto, CA, 2000
- Schmuchszene '95, Munich Germany, 1995
- Solo Exhibition, Mobilia Gallery, Cambridge, MA, 1994
- Solo Exhibition, Susan Cummins Gallery, Mill Valley, CA, 1993
- Documents Northwest: Six Jewelers, Seattle Art Museum, Seattle, WA, 1993
