= Sculpture Objects Functional Art and Design =

Art fairs held in the United States

Sculpture Objects Functional Art and Design (SOFA), originally known as Sculpture Objects Functional Art Exposition, was a series of art fairs held from 1994 to 2022 in Chicago (SOFA Chicago), and a smaller version in New York City (SOFA New York) from 1998 to 2012. The fairs were also known as Sculpture Objects and Functional Art Fair, International Exposition of Sculpture Objects and Functional Art, International Sculpture Objects & Functional Art Fair, International Sculpture Objects Functional Art and Design, and for two years as Intersect Chicago. SOFA West was held from 2009 to 2011 in Santa Fe, New Mexico. The founding director was Mark Lyman.

== History ==
=== Foundation ===
The founding director of both SOFA Chicago and SOFA New York was Mark Lyman, who remained as director until at least 2012. Lyman was also president of the Art Fair Company, which produced many art fairs in the United States.

=== Chicago ===
The inaugural Sculpture Objects Functional Art Exposition in Chicago (SOFA Chicago) was held in 1994 at Sheraton Chicago Hotel and Towers, with 58 exhibitors and 14,000 attendees. In 1995 the fair moved to Navy Pier. In 2002, at the Ninth Annual International Exposition of Sculpture Objects & Functional Art: SOFA Chicago 2002, it was reported that the British were leading an increased international presence at the expositions. In 2008, international galleries exhibited work by established artists such as Italian glass artists Lino Tagliapietra and Lucio Bubacco, along with American artists including Dale Chihuly, Ruth Duckworth, and Lenore Tawney. Emerging artists were also represented, as well as museum curators, art advisors, and collectors. A record 35,000 people attended the 2007 Chicago event.

In 2010, Art Fair Company staged the Intuit Show of Folk and Outsider Art alongside the 17th Annual International Sculpture Objects & Functional Art Fair (SOFA Chicago). In that year, it was the longest continually running art fair, and featured work from 80 art galleries and hosted art dealers from 10 countries. It hosted the two fairs again in 2011. In 2012 SOFA Chicago celebrated the 50th anniversary of the studio glass movement, with major international galleries presenting work by both historic and emerging glass artists.

By the time SOFA Chicago celebrated its 20th anniversary in October-November 2013, the event was branded "Sculpture Objects Functional Art + Design". By 2019 its visitors numbered 35,000 over four days.

After the October-November 2019 SOFA Chicago, the event was bought by Intersect Art and Design, and rebranded Intersect Chicago. Intersect Chicago was run online in November 2020 owing to the COVID-19 pandemic. Each day featured a special focus, including: Glass, Contemporary Art, Ceramic and Craft, Design, Outsider Art, Fiber Art, and Public Art / Sculpture. An in-person event was held in 2021. In 2022, it was renamed back to SOFA Chicago (Sculpture Objects Functional Art and Design), "owned and managed by vGMgt LLC, producers of Intersect Art and Design Fairs", but that appears to be its last edition.

=== New York ===
The inaugural Sculpture Objects Functional Art Exposition in New York (SOFA New York) was held in 1998 in the Seventh Regiment Armory. The Fourth Annual International Exposition of Sculpture Objects & Functional Art: SOFA New York, was held in 2001.

In 2011, a special dinner was held on the preview night of SOFA New York at the Museum of Arts and Design to honor art collector and patron Judy Cornfeld.

The last SOFA New York was held in April 2012, after rents were hiked and it became uneconomical to run the fair.

=== Santa Fe ===
The inaugural SOFA West was held in 2009 at the Santa Fe Convention Center in Santa Fe, New Mexico. This series, held in August, was supported by the Museum of New Mexico Foundation. The third event was held in 2011. but the show planned for August 2012 was cancelled in May of that year for economic reasons.

== Description ==
SOFA art fairs focused on only three-dimensional works "that cross the boundaries of fine art, decorative art, and design".

The fairs staged special exhibits by renowned museums, universities, and arts organizations, and held lecture series and special events.

SOFA Chicago was held in the Festival Hall on the historic Navy Pier for most of its existence, usually being held in November.

SOFA New York was a smaller fair, averaging around 40 dealers. It was held at the Seventh Regiment Armory on the corner of Park Avenue and 67th Street, and was usually held in June.
