= Nancy Worden =

American artist and metalsmith (1954–2021)

Nancy Lee Worden
- Born: November 29, 1954; Boston, Massachusetts
- Died: February 17, 2021 (aged 66); Seattle, Washington
- Known for: Metalsmith, jewelry maker

Nancy Lee Worden (November 29, 1954 – February 17, 2021) was an American artist and metalsmith. Her jewelry art is known for weaving together personal narratives with current politics. She received many awards and honors. Worden exhibited internationally, and her work is represented in collections around the world, including the Smithsonian American Art Museum and the Museum of Fine Arts, Boston.

== Education and early life ==
Worden was born in Boston, Massachusetts on November 29, 1954. She was raised in Ellensburg, Washington. Her parents were both academics. The family lived near Worden's grandparents, who lived on a small farm. There Worden learned to use hand tools to express her creativity. While in high school, she studied art under Kay Crimp, and in her junior year took her first jewelry class. During her senior year she enrolled in undergraduate metalsmithing classes at Central Washington University.

Worden started making jewelry when she was in high school. After high school, Worden enrolled in a degree program at Central Washington, earning her Bachelor of Fine Arts in 1977. There she studied with Ken Cory, who taught her jewelry fundamentals and encouraged her to develop her own personal artistic style. In 1980 Worden enrolled in the University of Georgia to study jewelry and metalsmithing under Gary Nofke. He encouraged her to develop a unique creative voice that was expressed through technique and materials. Worden received her Master of Fine Arts later in 1980.

== Career ==
After graduate school, Worden worked in retail jewelry and art galleries. This provided her training in the business aspects of jewelry as an art. During the 1980s, Worden organized shows for other artists, and refined her own style. In the 1990s, she developed a regional reputation. She began teaching herself to electroform in 1995.

By the late 1990s, she won national notoriety for her distinctive style that merged personal and political themes. In 2014 the Renwick Gallery of the Smithsonian American Art Museum (SAAM) acquired her necklace "The Family Reunion 2012." Several more of her pieces were acquired by (SAAM) as part of the Renwick Gallery's 50th Anniversary Campaign.

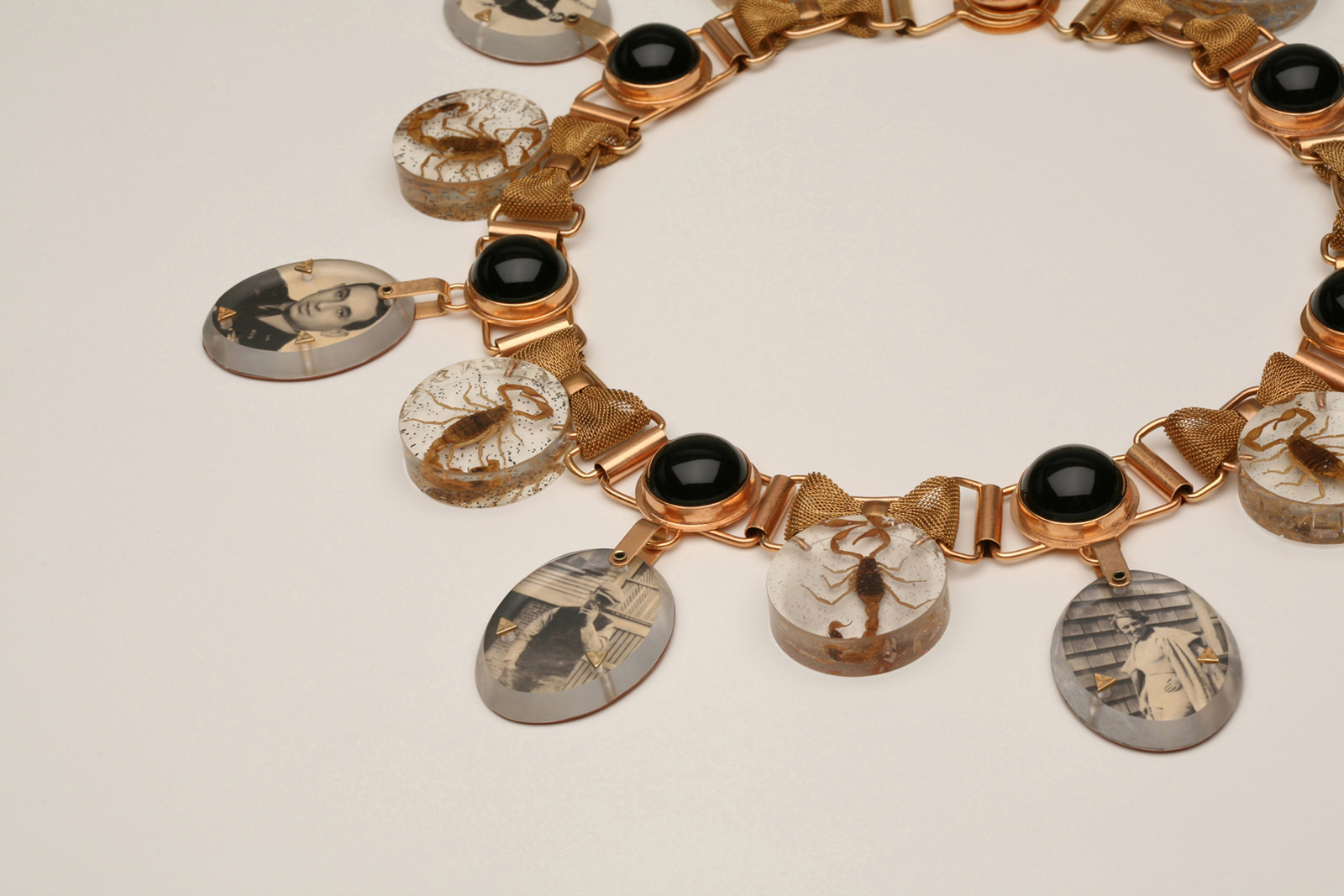
The Family Reunion by Nancy Worden

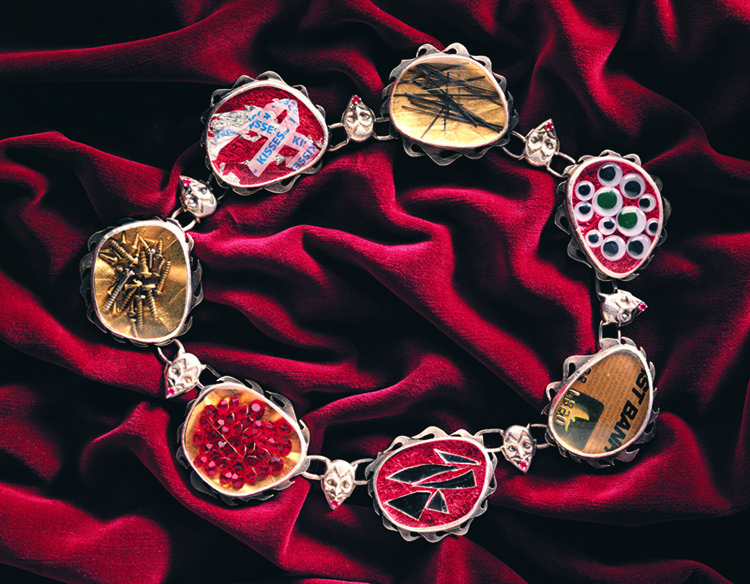
Seven Deadly Sins by Nancy Worden

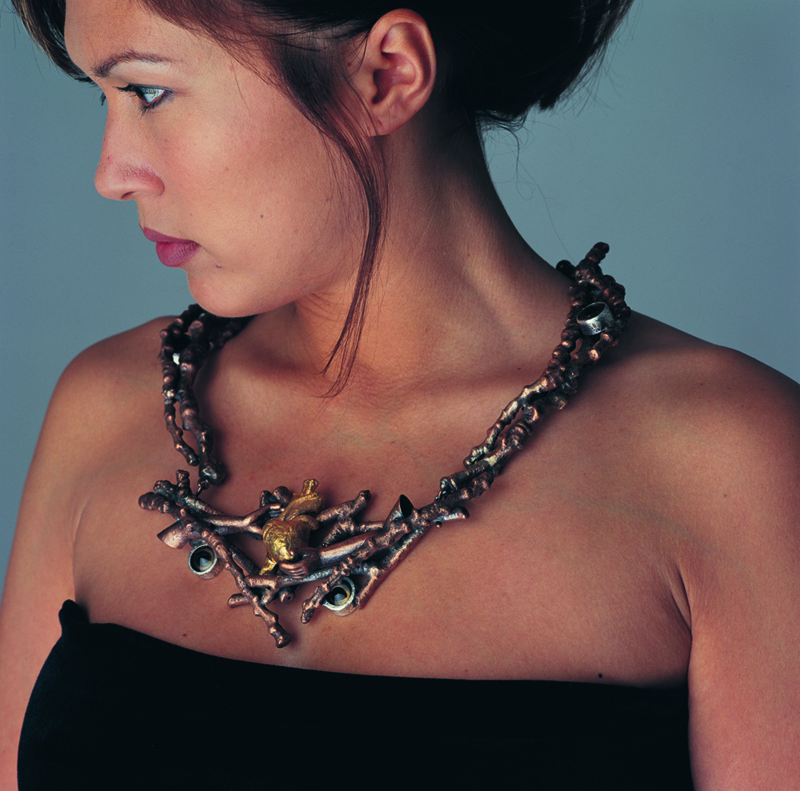
Repairing the Nest by Nancy Worden

== Exhibitions ==
From June through September, 2009, the Tacoma Art Museum presented a major retrospective of Worden's work, titled Loud Bones: The Jewelry of Nancy Worden. The exhibit featured 41 pieces from throughout Worden's 30-year career. It was accompanied by a book of the same title. The show was then presented at the Hallie Ford Museum of Art at Willamette University from November 2009 to January 2010.

== Collections ==
Her work in the collection of the Los Angeles County Museum of Art, the Museum of Arts and Design, New York the Museum of Fine Arts, Boston the Museum of Fine Arts, Houston, the Seattle Art Museum, the Smithsonian American Art Museum, and the Tacoma Art Museum.

== Death ==
She died February 17, 2021, in Seattle, Washington as a result of amyotrophic lateral sclerosis.
