= Hungary at the 2017 Summer Deaflympics =

- IPC code: HUN
- NPC: Hungarian Deaf Sport Federation
- Website: www.hdsf.hu

in Samsun
- Competitors: 27 in 10 sports
- Medals Ranked 44th: Gold 0 Silver 0 Bronze 1 Total 1

Summer Deaflympics appearances (overview)
- 1924; 1928; 1931; 1935; 1939; 1949; 1953; 1957; 1961; 1965; 1969; 1973; 1977; 1981; 1985; 1989; 1993; 1997; 2001; 2005; 2009; 2013; 2017; 2021

Hungary competed in the 2017 Summer Deaflympics for 20th time in the Summer Deaflympics since making its debut in the inaugural edition of the Deaflympics in 1924.

The competitors competed in 10 sporting events such as shooting, Tennis, Table tennis, Swimming, Athletics, Orienteering, Judo, Water polo and Beach Volleyball.

Hungary sent a delegation of 27 participants in the Games. The Hungarian team also consisted of veteran tennis player, Gabor Máthé who was also the flagbearer for Hungary at the Summer Deaflympics. Hungary managed to receive only 1 bronze medal in the competition.

Mira Zsuzanna Biatovszki was the only medalist for Hungary during the event bagging the solitary medal for the nation.

== Medalists ==
Name	Medal	Sport	Event
Mira Zsuzanna Biatovszki	Bronze	Shooting	Women's 10m air rifle

== Medal table ==
Sport	Gold	Silver	Bronze	Total
Shooting	0	0	1	1
Tennis	0	0	0	0
Table tennis	0	0	0	0
Athletics	0	0	0	0
Judo	0	0	0	0
Swimming	0	0	0	0
Beach Volleyball	0	0	0	0
Water polo	0	0	0	0
Cycling	0	0	0	0
Orienteering	0	0	0	0
