= Afghanistan at the 2017 Summer Deaflympics =

- IOC code: AFG
- NOC: All Afghanistan Sports Council of the Deaf
- Competitors: 5 in 2 sports
- Medals: Gold 0 Silver 0 Bronze 0 Total 0

Summer Deaflympics appearances (overview)
- 2017; 2021

Afghanistan competed in the 2017 Summer Deaflympics which was held in Samsun, Turkey. Afghanistan sent a team consisting of 5 athletes for the event. This was the country's first appearance at the games, having only becoming a member of the Deaflympics in 2013.

== Participants ==
Sport	Men	Women	Total
Athletics	4	0	4
Taekwondo	1	0	1
