= Shooting at the 2017 Summer Deaflympics =

Deaflympics event

Shooting at the 2017 Summer Deaflympics took place at the Bafra Shooting Range.

== Medal summary ==
* Host nation (Turkey)

Rank	NOC	Gold	Silver	Bronze	Total
1	South Korea (KOR)	6	3	2	11
2	Russia (RUS)	2	2	3	7
3	Ukraine (UKR)	2	2	1	5
4	Germany (GER)	1	2	1	4
5	Switzerland (SUI)	1	1	0	2
6	Croatia (CRO)	0	1	1	2
7	Iran (IRI)	0	1	0	1
8	Czech Republic (CZE)	0	0	1	1
8	Finland (FIN)	0	0	1	1
8	Hungary (HUN)	0	0	1	1
8	Israel (ISR)	0	0	1	1
Totals (11 entries)		12	12	12	36

== Medalists ==
=== Men ===
Event	Gold	Silver	Bronze
Men 10m Air Pistol	Kim Taeyoung; South Korea	Roman Anatolyevich Kuzmin; Russia	Boris Gramnjak; Croatia
Men 10m Air Rifle	Oleksandr Kostyk; Ukraine	Choi Changhoon; South Korea	Marek Bartosek; Czech Republic
Men 25 m Pistol	Kim Taeyoung; South Korea	Serhii Fomin; Ukraine	Klaus Tupi; Finland
Men 25m Rapid Fire Pistol	Oleksandr Kolodii; Ukraine	Kim Taeyoung; South Korea	Serhii Fomin; Ukraine
Men 50m Pistol	Kim Taeyoung; South Korea	Boris Gramnjak; Croatia	Kim Kihyeon; South Korea
Men 50m Rifle 3 Position	Choi Changhoon; South Korea	Thomas Moesching; Switzerland	Colin Daniel Mueller; Germany
Men 50m Rifle Prone	Thomas Moesching; Switzerland	Choi Changhoon; South Korea	Yanko Saar; Israel

=== Women ===
Event	Gold	Silver	Bronze
Women 10m Air Pistol	Chun Ji Won; South Korea	Fatemah Esfandiariyalmeh; Iran	Valeria Valeryevna Kladovikova; Russia
Women 10m Air Rifle	Melanie Stabel; Germany	Violeta Lykova; Ukraine	Mira Zsuzanna Biatovszki; Hungary
Women 50m Rifle 3 Position	Dina Droganova; Russia	Melanie Stabel; Germany	Daria Bulavina; Russia
Women 25m Pistol	Chun Ji Won; South Korea	Olga Misochenko; Russia	Valeria Valeryevna Kladovikova; Russia
Women 50m Rifle Prone	Daria Bulavina; Russia	Melanie Stabel; Germany	Kim Goh Woon; South Korea
