= Chrysanthi Chaina =

Greek basketball player (born 1982)

Personal information
- Born: 1982 (age 43–44)
Medals
Women's basketball
Deaflympics
Representing Greece
Gold medal – first place	Samsun 2017	team

Chrysanthi Chaina is a Greek professional basketball player. She has represented Greece at the Deaflympics on four occasions in 2009, 2013, 2017 and 2022.

== Career ==
She made her Deaflympic debut representing Greece at the 2009 Summer Deaflympics where Greece women's basketball team finished fourth in the basketball competition.

She was a member of the Greek basketball side which clinched gold medal in the women's basketball event during the 2017 Summer Deaflympics where Greece defeated Lithuania 67–50 in the final. She was a vital member of the Greek deaf basketball team which won the 2019 World Deaf Basketball Championships where Greece secured their maiden world title by defeating Lithuania 51–42 in the final.

She was also member of the Greek national side which secured fourth place at the 2013 Summer Deaflympics and in 2021 Summer Deaflympics.
