= Football at the 2017 Summer Deaflympics =

Deaflympics event

- Venue: Canik 19 Mayıs Stadium; Bafra Stadium; Çarşamba Stadium
- Location: Turkey, Samsun
- Dates: 18–30 July

Champions
- Men: Turkey
- Women: Russia

Football for both men and women was contested in the 2017 Summer Deaflympics from July 18 to July 30.

Canik 19 Mayıs Stadium, Bafra Stadium and Çarşamba Stadium were selected to host the football matches.

In the Men's category, Turkey defeated Ukraine to claim the gold medal and in the Women's category, Russia defeated Poland to claim the gold medal.

== Men's tournament ==
In the Men's category, 16 nations competed in 4 groups.

=== Group stage ===
==== Pool A ====
Pos	Team	Pld	W	D	L	GF	GA	GD	Pts	Qualification
1	Turkey (H)	3	3	0	0	7	1	6	9	Quarterfinals
2	Egypt	3	2	0	1	7	2	5	6	Quarterfinals
3	Saudi Arabia	3	1	0	2	8	8	0	3	
4	Venezuela	3	0	0	3	0	11	(-11)	0	

==== Pool B ====
Pos	Team	Pld	W	D	L	GF	GA	GD	Pts	Qualification
1	Germany	3	2	1	0	4	0	4	7	Quarterfinals
2	Iran	3	2	0	1	4	1	3	6	Quarterfinals
3	France	3	1	1	1	3	1	2	4	
4	Nigeria	3	0	0	3	0	9	(-9)	0	

==== Pool C ====
Pos	Team	Pld	W	D	L	GF	GA	GD	Pts	Qualification
1	Italy	3	1	2	0	5	4	1	5	Quarterfinals
2	Ukraine	3	1	1	1	5	3	2	4	Quarterfinals
3	Japan	3	1	1	1	6	6	0	4	
4	Argentina	3	0	2	1	3	6	(-3)	2	

==== Pool D ====
Pos	Team	Pld	W	D	L	GF	GA	GD	Pts	Qualification
1	Russia	3	3	0	0	9	1	8	9	Quarterfinals
2	Great Britain	3	2	0	1	9	4	5	6	Quarterfinals
3	South Korea	3	1	0	2	4	7	(-3)	3	
4	Brazil	3	0	0	3	2	12	(-10)	0	

=== Knockout stage ===
==== Elimination ====
Quarterfinals
25 July
Turkey	4
Iran	0
25 July
Italy	5
Great Britain	4
25 July
Egypt	2
Germany	1
25 July
Ukraine	5
Russia	4

Semifinals
27 July
Turkey	4
Italy	0
27 July
Ukraine	1
Egypt	0

Gold medal
30 July
Turkey	4
Ukraine	3
Bronze medal
29 July
Egypt	2
Italy	1

==== Classification ====
5th–8th place semi-finals
26 July
Great Britain	2
Iran	1
26 July
Germany	4
Russia	3

5th place match
29 July
Germany	4
Great Britain	1
7th place match
29 July
Russia	4
Iran	2

== Women's tournament ==
6 nations competed in one group, which was a Knockout eliminator.

=== Group stage ===
==== Pool A ====
Pos	Team	Pld	W	D	L	GF	GA	GD	Pts	Qualification
1	Poland	5	4	1	0	20	2	18	13	Gold medal match
2	Russia	5	4	0	1	17	1	16	12	Gold medal match
3	Brazil	5	2	2	1	16	7	9	8	Bronze medal match
4	Great Britain	5	2	1	2	11	5	6	7	Bronze medal match
5	Turkey (H)	5	1	0	4	7	13	(-6)	3	5th place match
6	China	5	0	0	5	0	43	(-43)	0	5th place match

=== Final results ===
Gold medal match
29 July
Russia	6
Poland	4

Bronze medal match
28 July
Brazil	2
Great Britain	1

5th place match
28 July
Turkey	6
China	0

== Medalists ==
Event	Gold	Silver	Bronze
Men	Turkey (TUR); Ersin Mert; Melih Kirişci, Serhat Başaran, Orhan Aydeniz, Soner Balcı, Hakan Erol, Hakan Kurt, Murat Şimşek, Kasım Kılıç, Eşref Metin Su, Hüseyin Er, Seyit Karaca, Janbert Özeser, Yunus Şahin, Mustafa Şaşmaz, Tolga Alkan, Mehmet Sert, Ali Dalkıran, Fırat Kaya, Mahmut Aktaş, İmamettin Sunmez, Mustafa Acar	Ukraine (UKR); Serhiy Frolov, Rodion Prychyna, Andrii Sotnikov, Viktor Pustovit, Volodymyr Valchuk, Volodymyr Riy, Dmytro Nevenchenko, Oleksii Stativka, Oleksandr Vereshchaka, Ihor Reutov, Dmytro Ukrainets, Ihor Shoturma, Shalva Mchedlishvili, Kostyantyn Voichenko, Andrii Sobchenko, Sergiy Bayev, Dmytro Beilousov, Oleksandr Olenych, Viacheslav Bragin	Egypt (EGY); Said Anwar Mahmoud Mekawi, Mohamed Saber, Reda Abdelwahab Elhendawy, Tarek Ahmed Aly, Abdel Salam Ibrahim Abdel Salam, Mohamed El Sayed, Hatem Abdelwadoud Gad, Mahmoud Ahmed Elawady, Mostafa Fariz, Mohamed Mahmoud Ahmed, Mostafa Abdelrahman Khalifa, Elsayed Abdelhamid, Mohamed Abdelhamed Hamed Abdelhay, Hamada Yassein, Mohamed Ahmed Abdou Helal, Eslam Ahmed, Hossam Maher Elbana, Ahmed Mansour Abdelrahman, Ahmed Saber Emad, Omar Nasser, Gamal Elsayed Saber, Mohamed Ahmed Abouelela
Women	Russia (RUS); Olga Mikhailova, Anastasia Vitalyevna Karavaeva, Ksenia Kozhevnikova, Marina Olegovna Shlenkova, Tatyana Vladimirovna Bolshakova, Svetlana Nikolaevna Gagarina, Elena Alexandrovna Tolstova, Veronika Evgenyevna Nazina, Irina Viktorovna Degtyareva, Valentina Golovina, Yulia Kozhemyakina, Anna Andreevna Antonova, Olga Nikitina, Margarita Nikulina, Anzhela Georgievna Gavrilash, Liubov Endakova, Olga Alexandrovna Sundukova, Vilena Sazhnova, Nellya Nikitina, Svetlana Sergeevna Lukina	Poland (POL); Julia Kopinska, Izabela Kuzniak, Ewa Jacyna, Agnieszka Kaczmarczyk, Alina Jagodzinska, Paulina Prusinowska, Karolina Dampc, Klaudia Lasicka, Agnieszka Bockowska, Marta Kaczmarczyk, Emilia Althoff, Krystyna Nowak, Wiktoria Aumiiller, Jolanta Kultys, Anna Kusmierek, Marta Zalewska, Ewa Liscioch, Karolina Wojtkiewicz, Katarzyna Hoffa, Agata Dampc, Justyna Siwek, Joanna Kaczmarczyk	Brazil (BRA); Fernanda Falkevicz, Mariana Gomes Silva, Carolina Matos Ribeiro, Vanessa Wons, Stefany Krebs, Suzana Alves Souza, Andressa Trevine Pires, Vanderleia Barbosa Gonçalves, Josiane Maria Poleski, Laelen Cássia Brizola, Lara Geovana Neves, Aline Cristina Kaiser, Soraia Gomes Silva, Joyce de Lima Rodrigues, Irozina Rauen Vanelli, Luana de Jesus, Deborah Dias Souza, Marina de Moraes Silva
