= 19 Mayıs Stadium =

19 Mayıs Stadium (lit. '19 May Stadium' in commemoration of the beginning of Turkish War of Independence) may refer to football and multi-purpose stadiums in Turkey:

- Ankara 19 Mayıs Stadium
- Manisa 19 Mayıs Stadium
- Samsun 19 Mayıs Stadium
  - Samsun 19 Mayıs Stadium (1975)

== See also ==
- 19 Mayıs or Ondokuzmayıs (lit. '19 May'), district in Samsun, Turkey
