= Israel at the 2017 Summer Deaflympics =

- IOC code: ISR
- NOC: Israel Deaf Sports Federation
- Website: www.israeldeafsport.org

in Samsun
- Competitors: 6 in 4 sports
- Medals Ranked 44th: Gold 0 Silver 0 Bronze 1 Total 1

Summer Deaflympics appearances (overview)
- 1957; 1961; 1965; 1969; 1973; 1977; 1981; 1985; 1989; 1993; 1997; 2001; 2005; 2009; 2013; 2017; 2021

Israel competed in the 2017 Summer Deaflympics which was held in Samsun, Turkey and they sent a delegation of just 6 participants for the event. This was the 15th appearance for Israel in the Deaflympics after making its debut way back in 1993. The Israeli team managed to receive the solitary bronze medal in the Men's Shooting. This was the second overall medal won by Israel in their Deaflympic history (after 24 years), following a bronze medal in the 1993 Summer Deaflympics.

== Participants ==
Name	Sport
Bokler Avi	Karate
Hadad Yaniv Josef	Cross Country
Lotan Ziv	Cross Country
Lutsky Gabriel	Tennis
Negev Avishay	Cross Country
Yanko Saar	Shooting

== Medal table ==
Sport	Gold	Silver	Bronze	Total
Shooting	0	0	1	1

== Medalists ==
Name	Sport	Event	Medal
Yanko Saar	Shooting	Men's 50m Prone	Bronze

== Shooting ==
Israeli deaf male shooter, Yanko Saar clinched the bronze medal for the nation in the 50 meters rifle prone with an aggregate of 180.2. He became the 1st Israeli individual athlete to win a medal in Deaflympics history.
