= Karate at the 2017 Summer Deaflympics =

Deaflympics event

- Venue: Atatürk Sports Hall
- Location: Turkey, Samsun
- Dates: 24–26 July

Karate at the 2017 Summer Deaflympics in Samsun was held from 24 to 26 July 2017 at the Atatürk Sports Hall in Canik.

== Medal summary ==
* Host nation (Turkey)

Rank	NOC	Gold	Silver	Bronze	Total
1	Ukraine (UKR)	6	5	4	15
2	Venezuela (VEN)	4	1	5	10
3	Russia (RUS)	3	6	6	15
4	Turkey (TUR)*	2	2	8	12
5	Iran (IRI)	1	4	5	10
6	Italy (ITA)	1	0	3	4
7	Thailand (THA)	1	0	0	1
8	Brazil (BRA)	0	0	1	1
8	Bulgaria (BUL)	0	0	1	1
8	Chinese Taipei (TPE)	0	0	1	1
8	Kazakhstan (KAZ)	0	0	1	1
Totals (11 entries)		18	18	35	71

== Medalists ==
=== Men ===
Event	Gold	Silver	Bronze
Men Kata	Phongsathat Phantib; Thailand	Can Burak Mert; Turkey	Radiy Bezoyan; Russia
Men Kata	Phongsathat Phantib; Thailand	Can Burak Mert; Turkey	Fatih Çiçek; Turkey
Men Kata Team	Turkey (TUR); Can Burak Mert, Fatih Çiçek, Mehmet Ali Sapmaz	Ukraine (UKR); Oleksandr Kalnyk, Vladyslav Plish, Oleksandr Trytiak	Russia (RUS); Radiy Bezoyan, Evgeny Gayvoronskiy, Evgeniy Vitalyevich Pavlyuchenko
Men Kata Team	Turkey (TUR); Can Burak Mert, Fatih Çiçek, Mehmet Ali Sapmaz	Ukraine (UKR); Oleksandr Kalnyk, Vladyslav Plish, Oleksandr Trytiak	Venezuela (VEN); Josue Abraham Lopez, Omar Jose Velis Cordero, Fernando Geraldo Zerlin
Men Kumite -60 kg	Milad Sadeghzadehmoghadam; Iran	Tigran Kolyan; Russia	Can Burak Mert; Turkey
Men Kumite -60 kg	Milad Sadeghzadehmoghadam; Iran	Tigran Kolyan; Russia	Viacheslav Novikov; Ukraine
Men Kumite -67 kg	Sergei Alexeevich Borovikin; Russia	Mehmet Ali Sapmaz; Turkey	Mohammad Khidayar; Iran
Men Kumite -67 kg	Sergei Alexeevich Borovikin; Russia	Mehmet Ali Sapmaz; Turkey	Maksym Belenok; Ukraine
Men Kumite -75 kg	Nikolay Alexeevich Kozlov; Russia	Volodymyr Makhno; Ukraine	Nikolay Hristov; Bulgaria
Men Kumite -75 kg	Nikolay Alexeevich Kozlov; Russia	Volodymyr Makhno; Ukraine	Volkan Kardeşler; Turkey
Men Kumite -84 kg	Yorman Gonzalo Vega Parra; Venezuela	Oleksandr Makhno; Ukraine	Giovanni Improta; Italy
Men Kumite -84 kg	Yorman Gonzalo Vega Parra; Venezuela	Oleksandr Makhno; Ukraine	Alexander Merkov; Russia
Men Kumite +84 kg	Sergey Tetyushkin; Russia	Hossein Tabartehfarahani; Iran	Heron Rodrigues Da Silva; Brazil
Men Kumite +84 kg	Sergey Tetyushkin; Russia	Hossein Tabartehfarahani; Iran	Alexander Vargas; Venezuela
Men Kumite Open	Pasquale Longobardi; Italy	Alexander Merkov; Russia	Giuseppe Alibrandi; Italy
Men Kumite Open	Pasquale Longobardi; Italy	Alexander Merkov; Russia	Fernando Zerlin; Venezuela
Men Kumite Team	Ukraine (UKR); Maksym Belenok, Oleksandr Makhno, Volodymyr Makhno, Viacheslav Novikov, Oleksandr Trytiak	Iran (IRI); Mohammadreza Houshyar, Mohammad Khodayar, Seyedahmad Nadarvand, Kamran Rezaeinejad, Milad Sadeghzadehmoghadam, Mohammad Shayan, Hossein Tabartehfarahani	Italy (ITA); Giuseppe Alibrandi, Marco De Luca, Daniele Di Guido, Giovanni Improta, Pasquale Longobardi, Maurizio Tornincasa
Men Kumite Team	Ukraine (UKR); Maksym Belenok, Oleksandr Makhno, Volodymyr Makhno, Viacheslav Novikov, Oleksandr Trytiak	Iran (IRI); Mohammadreza Houshyar, Mohammad Khodayar, Seyedahmad Nadarvand, Kamran Rezaeinejad, Milad Sadeghzadehmoghadam, Mohammad Shayan, Hossein Tabartehfarahani	Russia (RUS); Artem Cherabaev, Mikhail Gromov, Nikolay Kozlov, Alexander Merkov, Nikita Pomazkov, Evgeny Romashov, Sergey Tetyushkin

=== Women ===
Event	Gold	Silver	Bronze
Women Kata	Liz Cabeza; Venezuela	Diana Godoy; Venezuela	Mojdeh Mardani; Iran
Women Kata	Liz Cabeza; Venezuela	Diana Godoy; Venezuela	Inna Mazhara; Ukraine
Women Kata Team	Venezuela (VEN); Diana Godoy; Liz Cabeza; Ana Rivera	Iran (IRI); Nahid Amiri; Samaneh Borji; Parvin Yareh	Turkey (TUR); Kader Işık; Rezzan Işık; Zeliha Işık
Women Kata Team	Venezuela (VEN); Diana Godoy; Liz Cabeza; Ana Rivera	Iran (IRI); Nahid Amiri; Samaneh Borji; Parvin Yareh	Ukraine (UKR); Tetiana Khyl; Kateryna Maslo; Inna Mazhara
Women Kumite -50 kg	Ana Rivera; Venezuela	Maryna Hubanova; Ukraine	Bahareh Safari; Iran
Women Kumite -50 kg	Ana Rivera; Venezuela	Maryna Hubanova; Ukraine	Olimpiada Kalinina; Russia
Women Kumite -55 kg	Vita Havrilova; Ukraine	Naiba Alieva; Russia	Atefeh Bayat; Iran
Women Kumite -55 kg	Vita Havrilova; Ukraine	Naiba Alieva; Russia	Lin Wen-Fang; Chinese Taipei
Women Kumite -61 kg	Karyna Ianchuk; Ukraine	Anna Sharandova; Russia	Yelena Salmina; Kazakhstan
Women Kumite -61 kg	Karyna Ianchuk; Ukraine	Anna Sharandova; Russia	Rümeysa Akyüzlü; Turkey
Women Kumite -68 kg	Inna Mazhara; Ukraine	Sara Adria; Iran	Daria Aleksandrovna Pavlona; Russia
Women Kumite -68 kg	Inna Mazhara; Ukraine	Sara Adria; Iran	Melek Derekoy; Turkey
Women Kumite +68 kg	Gamze Keresteci; Turkey	Natalia Verdish; Russia	Bita Javaheri; Iran
Women Kumite Open	Karyna Ianchuk; Ukraine	Inna Mazhara; Ukraine	Kader Işık; Turkey
Women Kumite Open	Karyna Ianchuk; Ukraine	Inna Mazhara; Ukraine	Liz Cabeza; Venezuela
Women Kumite Team	Ukraine (UKR); Vita Havrilova; Maryna Hubanova; Karyna Ianchuk; Inna Mazhara	Russia (RUS); Naiba Alieva; Daria Aleksandrovna Pavlova; Anna Igorevna Sharandova; Olga Bronevna Urbutite; Ekaterina Varavko	Turkey (TUR); Rümeysa Akyüzlü; Melek Derekoy; Melek Morgil; Sena Sönmez; İrem Topaloğlu
Women Kumite Team	Ukraine (UKR); Vita Havrilova; Maryna Hubanova; Karyna Ianchuk; Inna Mazhara	Russia (RUS); Naiba Alieva; Daria Aleksandrovna Pavlova; Anna Igorevna Sharandova; Olga Bronevna Urbutite; Ekaterina Varavko	Venezuela (VEN); Diana Auxilliadora Godoy; Liz Cabera; Ana Rivera

== See also ==
- Karate at the 2021 Summer Deaflympics
