= Handball at the 2017 Summer Deaflympics =

Deaflympics event

- Venue: Çarşamba Sports Hall
- Location: Turkey, Samsun
- Dates: 20–28 July

Handball at the 2017 Summer Deaflympics in Samsun took place at Çarşamba Sports Hall from 20 to 28 July 2017.

== Men's competition ==
=== Group stage ===
==== Pool A ====
Pos	Team	Pld	W	D	L	GF	GA	GD	Pts	Qualification
1	Turkey	3	2	0	1	80	60	20	4	Semifinals
2	Russia	3	2	0	1	77	55	22	4	Semifinals
3	Serbia	3	2	0	1	73	56	17	4	Classification
4	Brazil	3	0	0	3	42	101	(-59)	0	Classification

==== Pool B ====
Pos	Team	Pld	W	D	L	GF	GA	GD	Pts	Qualification
1	Croatia	2	2	0	0	51	35	16	4	Semifinals
2	Germany	2	1	0	1	42	37	5	2	Semifinals
3	Denmark	2	0	0	2	31	52	-21	0	Classification

=== Knockout stage ===
Semifinals
26 July
Turkey	24
Germany	22
26 July
Russia	31
Croatia	30

Gold medal
28 July
Turkey	30
Russia	26
Bronze medal
28 July
Croatia	26
Germany	22

=== Classification ===
5th place match
26 July
Serbia	37
Denmark	17

6th place match
27 July
Denmark	24
Brazil	22

== Medal summary ==
* Host nation (Turkey)

Rank	NOC	Gold	Silver	Bronze	Total
1	Turkey (TUR)*	1	0	0	1
2	Russia (RUS)	0	1	0	1
3	Croatia (CRO)	0	0	1	1
Totals (3 entries)		1	1	1	3

== Medalists ==
Event	Gold	Silver	Bronze
Men's team	Turkey (TUR); Emre Özçelik, Taşkın Kızılkaya, Kemal Gündüz, Cem Denli, Ali Rıfat Şahin, Ergin Yılmaz, Ahmet Gozel, Murat Acar, Hamza Alkoyun, Mustafa Ozbay, Remzi Sönmez, Mustafa Semiz, Mahmut Volkan Kış, İsmail Tuna, Serkan Oral, Murat Atak, Samet Köklü, Tugay Gündoğdu	Russia (RUS); Alexey Dremkov, Denis Panov, Vladislav Skafar, Aslan Digurov, Roman Storozhev, Maksim Ovcharenko, Yury Valerievich Burykin, Roman Maluev, Vladimir Filatov, Andrey Sizov, Stanislav Sergeevich Surovskiy, Mikhail Olegovich Nikulin, Sergey Sergeevich Samoylyukov, Valery Sinilkin, Anton Kitaev, Murat Chomaev	Croatia (CRO); Marko Prosenski, Antonio Rozic, Ilija Perak, Daniel Fodor, Kristijan Zivkovic, Oliver Lusic, Tomislav Bosnjak, Pero Jukic, Jakov Kolaric, Stjepan Sculac, Bojan Crnojevic, Ziga Bedenik, Goran Skoko, Ivan Pajic, Mateo Perak, Dean Sagovac, Nemanja Damjanic, Marjan Turkovic
