= Laura Štefanac =

Croatian paralympic athlete

Personal information
- Nationality: Croatian
- Citizenship: Croatian
- Born: 1998 (age 27–28) Zagreb, Croatia

Sport
- Sport: athletics
- Disability: deaf
- Event(s): javelin throw, discus thriw, shot put
- Club: AK Agram

Laura Štefanac is a Croatian deaf athlete competing in javelin throw, hammer throw, discus throw and shot put. She won a gold medal at the 2017 Deaflympics in Samsun in javelin throw, as well as 3 gold and 3 silver medals at the European junior championships in Trabzon 2014 and Karlsruhe 2016. She is a member of AK Agram from Zagreb.

She was born deaf in 1998 in Zagreb.
