= Afghanistan at the Deaflympics =

- IPC code: AFG
- Medals: Gold 0 Silver 0 Bronze 0 Total 0

Summer appearances
- 2017; 2021

Afghanistan competed at the Deaflympics for the first time during the 2017 Summer Deaflympics which was held in Samsun, Turkey. Afghani team sent a five-member delegation for the Deaflympic event held in 2017, which is the only Deaflympic event where Afghanistan took part. The five members were: Ahmad Reshad Azizi (400m), Faiz Ahmad Faizi (Taekwondo -68 kg), Ekilil Khaliqyar (200m), Payman Noori (100m) and Ahman Fawad Sultani (100m). Afghanistan is yet to earn a medal at the Deaflympics.

== Medal tallies ==
=== Summer Deaflympics ===
Year	Gold	Silver	Bronze	Total
2017	0	0	0	0
2021	0	0	0	0

== See also ==
- Afghanistan at the Olympics
- Afghanistan at the Paralympics
