= Israel at the Deaflympics =

- IPC code: ISR
- NPC: Israel Deaf Sports Organization
- Website: www.israeldeafsport.org
- Medals: Gold 1 Silver 0 Bronze 3 Total 4

Summer appearances
- 1957; 1961; 1965; 1969; 1973; 1977; 1981; 1985; 1989; 1993; 1997; 2001; 2005; 2009; 2013; 2017; 2021

Israel has been regularly participating at the Deaflympics since making their debut in 1957. Israel claimed their first medal in Deaflympics history in 1993 for basketball.

== Medal tallies ==
=== Summer Deaflympics ===
Event	Gold	Silver	Bronze	Total
1957	0	0	0	0
1965	0	0	0	0
1969	0	0	0	0
1973	0	0	0	0
1977	0	0	0	0
1981	0	0	0	0
1985	0	0	0	0
1989	0	0	0	0
1993	0	0	1	1
1997	0	0	0	0
2001	0	0	0	0
2005	0	0	0	0
2009	0	0	0	0
2013	0	0	0	0
2017	0	0	1	1
2021	0	0	1	1

=== Winter Deaflympics ===
Event	Gold	Silver	Bronze	Total
2019	1	0	0	1

== See also ==
- Israel at the Olympics
- Israel at the Paralympics
