= Cuba at the 2017 Summer Deaflympics =

Cuba at the 2017 Deaflympics
- IOC code: CUB
- NOC: Cuban National Association of Sports and Recreation for the Deaf

in Samsun
- Competitors: 5
- Medals Ranked 17th: Gold 2 Silver 1 Bronze 0 Total 3

Summer appearances
- 1924; 1928; 1931; 1935; 1939; 1949; 1953; 1957; 1961; 1965; 1969; 1973; 1977; 1981; 1985; 1989; 1993; 1997; 2001; 2005; 2009; 2013; 2017; 2021

Cuba competed in the 2017 Summer Deaflympics which was held in Samsun, Turkey. Cuba sent a delegation consisting of only 5 participants for the event. This was the 6th successive time that Cuba participated in the Summer Deaflympics since making its Deaflympic debut in 1993.

Cuban track and field athlete, Suslaidy Girat was the only medalist for Cuba at the multi-sport event as she claimed 3 medals in the women's athletics including 2 gold medals in the women's 100m event and triple jump

== Medalists ==
| Name | Medal | Sport | Event |
|---|---|---|---|
| Suslaidy Girat | Gold | Athletics | Women's triple jump |
| Suslaidy Girat | Gold | Athletics | Women's 100m event |
| Suslaidy Girat | Silver | Athletics | Women's long jump |

== Medal table ==
| Sport | Gold | Silver | Bronze | Total |
|---|---|---|---|---|
| Athletics | 2 | 1 | 0 | 3 |
