= Wrestling at the 2017 Summer Deaflympics =

Deaflympics event

- Venue: Kavak Sports Hall
- Location: Turkey, Samsun
- Dates: 21–26 July

Wrestling at the 2017 Summer Deaflympics took place at the Kavak Sports Hall.

== Medal summary ==
* Host nation (Turkey)

Rank	NOC	Gold	Silver	Bronze	Total
1	Russia	6	4	2	12
2	Turkey*	5	0	6	11
3	Iran	2	2	7	11
4	Ukraine	1	4	2	7
5	Greece	1	1	0	2
6	India	1	0	2	3
7	Georgia	0	2	1	3
7	Mongolia	0	2	1	3
9	Portugal	0	1	0	1
10	Armenia	0	0	4	4
11	Bulgaria	0	0	2	2
11	Kazakhstan	0	0	2	2
11	Kyrgyzstan	0	0	2	2
14	Lithuania	0	0	1	1
Totals (14 entries)		16	16	32	64

== Medalists ==
=== Men's freestyle ===
Event	Gold	Silver	Bronze
57kg	Keyvan Rostamabadi; Iran	Erkhembayar Namdagdorj; Mongolia	Sargis Sargsyans; Armenia
57kg	Keyvan Rostamabadi; Iran	Erkhembayar Namdagdorj; Mongolia	Panayot Dimitrov; Bulgaria
61kg	Askar Askarov; Russia	Andrii Kambur; Ukraine	Mehdi Bakhshi; Iran
61kg	Askar Askarov; Russia	Andrii Kambur; Ukraine	Mehmet Ali Yiğit; Turkey
65kg	Hosein Nouridashlejeh; Iran	Chinzorig Dorjdagva; Mongolia	Onur Arı; Turkey
65kg	Hosein Nouridashlejeh; Iran	Chinzorig Dorjdagva; Mongolia	Ajay Kumar; India
70kg	Vasiliy Strekalovskiy; Russia	Hossein Derikvand; Iran	Ercan Gör; Turkey
70kg	Vasiliy Strekalovskiy; Russia	Hossein Derikvand; Iran	Vitaliy Korepanov; Ukraine
74kg	Virender Singh; India	Shakro Chakvetadze; Georgia	Batbaatar Shirendev; Mongolia
74kg	Virender Singh; India	Shakro Chakvetadze; Georgia	Aleksandr Ochirovich Tsoktoev; Russia
86kg	Kazbek Khugaev; Russia	Anatolii Chervonenko; Ukraine	Dursun Gözel; Turkey
86kg	Kazbek Khugaev; Russia	Anatolii Chervonenko; Ukraine	Mohsen Manouchehrtelouri; Iran
97kg	İlhan Çıtak; Turkey	Viktor Antypenko; Ukraine	Sumit Dahiya; India
97kg	İlhan Çıtak; Turkey	Viktor Antypenko; Ukraine	Assylzhan Tazhiyev; Kazakhstan
125kg	Sergii Minchenko; Ukraine	Alexandros Papadatos; Greece	Milias Markov; Kyrgyzstan
125kg	Sergii Minchenko; Ukraine	Alexandros Papadatos; Greece	Alireza Rayeji; Iran

=== Men's Greco-Roman ===
Event	Gold	Silver	Bronze
59kg	Mehmet Ali Yiğit; Turkey	Kirill Andreevich Chulkov; Russia	Giorgi Janelidze; Georgia
59kg	Mehmet Ali Yiğit; Turkey	Kirill Andreevich Chulkov; Russia	Alireza Daneshvar; Iran
66kg	Martin Aleksanov; Russia	Lasha Janelidze; Georgia	Ivan Stoilov; Bulgaria
66kg	Martin Aleksanov; Russia	Lasha Janelidze; Georgia	Celal Koçak; Turkey
71kg	Muhammet Akdeniz; Turkey	Hugo Miguel Passos; Portugal	Zhora Grigoryan; Armenia
71kg	Muhammet Akdeniz; Turkey	Hugo Miguel Passos; Portugal	Andrey Andreevich Lazukin; Russia
75kg	Kadir Kuş; Turkey	Vitaliy Kuzmenkov; Russia	Ararht Sargsyan; Armenia
75kg	Kadir Kuş; Turkey	Vitaliy Kuzmenkov; Russia	Mantas Kazimieras Sinkevicius; Lithuania
80kg	Eduard Shirazdanov; Russia	Abouzar Rabiezadeh; Iran	Narek Nikoghosyan; Armenia
80kg	Eduard Shirazdanov; Russia	Abouzar Rabiezadeh; Iran	Ahmet Talha Kacur; Turkey
85kg	David Tregubov; Russia	Roman Iashchenko; Ukraine	Rasoul Daryani; Iran
85kg	David Tregubov; Russia	Roman Iashchenko; Ukraine	Gabit Aidarbekov; Kyrgyzstan
98kg	İlhan Çıtak; Turkey	Vladislav Tarasov; Russia	Akbar Saberi; Iran
98kg	İlhan Çıtak; Turkey	Vladislav Tarasov; Russia	Viktor Antypenko; Ukraine
130kg	Alexandros Papadatos; Greece	Evgeny Zheltukhin; Russia	Hashem Biabani; Iran
130kg	Alexandros Papadatos; Greece	Evgeny Zheltukhin; Russia	Khairatkhaan Shonku; Kazakhstan
