= Evangelia Sarakatsani =

Greek basketball player

Personal information
- Born: 1981 (age 44–45)
Medals
Women's basketball
Deaflympics
Representing Greece
Gold medal – first place	Samsun 2017	team

Evangelia Sarakatsani (born 1981) is a Greek professional basketball player. She has represented Greece at the Deaflympics on five occasions in 2001, 2009, 2013, 2017 and 2022.

== Career ==
She made her Deaflympic debut representing Greece at the 2001 Summer Deaflympics where Greece women's basketball team finished fifth in the basketball competition.

She was a member of the Greek basketball side which clinched gold medal in the women's basketball event during the 2017 Summer Deaflympics where Greece defeated Lithuania 67–50 in the final.

She was also member of the Greek national side which secured fourth place at the 2009 Summer Deaflympics, 2013 Summer Deaflympics and in 2021 Summer Deaflympics.
