= Sarakatsani (disambiguation) =

Sarakatsani may refer to:

- Sarakatsani people
- Sarakatsani Folklore Museum
- Aikaterini Sarakatsani
- Evangelia Sarakatsani
