= Judo at the 2017 Summer Deaflympics =

Deaflympics event

Judo Judo at the 2017 Summer Deaflympics
- Venue: Atatürk Sports Hall
- Location: Turkey, Samsun
- Dates: 20–22 July

Judo at the 2017 Summer Deaflympics in Samsun was held from 20 to 22 July 2017 at the Atatürk Sports Hall in Canik.

== Medal summary ==
* Host nation (Turkey)

Rank	NOC	Gold	Silver	Bronze	Total
1	Russia (RUS)	7	7	1	15
2	Ukraine (UKR)	5	1	7	13
3	South Korea (KOR)	2	3	2	7
4	Turkey (TUR)*	2	1	3	6
5	Mexico (MEX)	1	0	0	1
6	Mongolia (MGL)	0	2	4	6
7	Poland (POL)	0	1	1	2
8	Armenia (ARM)	0	1	0	1
8	Kazakhstan (KAZ)	0	1	0	1
10	France (FRA)	0	0	3	3
10	Iran (IRI)	0	0	3	3
12	Brazil (BRA)	0	0	1	1
12	Kyrgyzstan (KGZ)	0	0	1	1
12	Netherlands (NED)	0	0	1	1
12	Portugal (POR)	0	0	1	1
12	Venezuela (VEN)	0	0	1	1
Totals (16 entries)		17	17	29	63

== Medalists ==
=== Men's events ===
Event	Gold	Silver	Bronze
Men -60 kg	Erkan Esenboğa; Turkey	Robert Gevorgyan; Armenia	Mehrdad Bodaghi; Iran
Men -60 kg	Erkan Esenboğa; Turkey	Robert Gevorgyan; Armenia	Han Myeongjin; South Korea
Men -66 kg	Ruslan Maximovich Askerov; Russia	Shayakhmet Kanapiyanov; Kazakhstan	Albert Westerhof; Netherlands
Men -66 kg	Ruslan Maximovich Askerov; Russia	Shayakhmet Kanapiyanov; Kazakhstan	Vladyslav Mozyrev; Ukraine
Men -73 kg	Dmytro Sheretov; Ukraine	Sergey Yuryevich Belyaev; Russia	Camille Brasse; France
Men -73 kg	Dmytro Sheretov; Ukraine	Sergey Yuryevich Belyaev; Russia	Munkh-Orgil Badamsambuu; Mongolia
Men -81 kg	Kim Minseok; South Korea	Zaur Bayzetovich Bedanokov; Russia	Cyril Jonard; France
Men -81 kg	Kim Minseok; South Korea	Zaur Bayzetovich Bedanokov; Russia	Navaanjamis Bayanmunkh; Mongolia
Men -90 kg	Rinat Gayazovich Kadyrov; Russia	Yang Jungmu; South Korea	Alexandre Soares Fernandes; Brazil
Men -90 kg	Rinat Gayazovich Kadyrov; Russia	Yang Jungmu; South Korea	Arthur Repiquet; France
Men -100 kg	Konstantin Popov; Russia	Baasandorj Davaanyam; Mongolia	Mehrdad Seidi; Iran
Men -100 kg	Konstantin Popov; Russia	Baasandorj Davaanyam; Mongolia	Samet Bulut; Turkey
Men +100 kg	Rustem Rashitovich Akhmetov; Russia	Mehmet Uysal; Turkey	Ilgiz Uulu Kanalbek; Kyrgyzstan
Men +100 kg	Rustem Rashitovich Akhmetov; Russia	Mehmet Uysal; Turkey	Anton Slushnyi; Ukraine
Men Team	South Korea (KOR); Byeon Jinsub, Hwang Hyeon, Kim Minseok, Yang Jungmu	Russia (RUS); Ruslan Maximovich Askerov, Zaur Bayzetovich Bedanokov, Sergey Yuryevich Belyaev, Rostislav Berk, Gadzhi Elyshadogly Gadzhiev, Gadzhi Elyshadogly Gadzhiev, Murad Sapigajievich Magomedilaev, Konstantin Popov, Mikhail Sidorov	Iran (IRI); Hossein Allahkarimi, Mohammad Asiabi Shafiei, Ali Dehghan Ghourdarband, Masoud Rastegar, Ali Salahshour Gol Khani, Masood Sefidi, Mehrdad Seidi
Men Team	South Korea (KOR); Byeon Jinsub, Hwang Hyeon, Kim Minseok, Yang Jungmu	Russia (RUS); Ruslan Maximovich Askerov, Zaur Bayzetovich Bedanokov, Sergey Yuryevich Belyaev, Rostislav Berk, Gadzhi Elyshadogly Gadzhiev, Gadzhi Elyshadogly Gadzhiev, Murad Sapigajievich Magomedilaev, Konstantin Popov, Mikhail Sidorov	Ukraine (UKR); Alim Bryzhak, Volodymyr Maklakov, Vladyslav Mozyrev, Yevhen Nekhaiev, Luka Netiaha, Andrii Penzii, Dmytro Sheretov, Anton Slushnyi

=== Women's events ===
Event	Gold	Silver	Bronze
Women -48 kg	Maria Huitron; Mexico	Alina Pozdeeva; Russia	Kseniia Dovbyshchuk; Ukraine
Women -52 kg	Anna Shostak; Ukraine	Chayana Oorzhak; Russia	Lkhagvasuren Gantumur; Mongolia
Women -52 kg	Anna Shostak; Ukraine	Chayana Oorzhak; Russia	Dominika Mateuszczyk; Poland
Women -57 kg	Kateryna Avdieieva; Ukraine	Oyundelgerekh Baatar; Mongolia	Liana Timasheva; Russia
Women -57 kg	Kateryna Avdieieva; Ukraine	Oyundelgerekh Baatar; Mongolia	Mayerlyn Nereida Barreto Rodriguez; Venezuela
Women -63 kg	Kateryna Shepeliuk; Ukraine	Elizaveta Trushchenko; Russia	Joana Paulo Santos; Portugal
Women -70 kg	Jenny Chamyyan; Russia	Hong Eunmi; South Korea	Ayse Kesiktaş; Turkey
Women -70 kg	Jenny Chamyyan; Russia	Hong Eunmi; South Korea	Maryna Pogorelova; Ukraine
Women -78 kg	Zaira Ataeva; Russia	Mariia Korniichuk; Ukraine	Chimedlkham Myagmarsuren; Mongolia
Women +78 kg	Natalia Borisovna Drozdova; Russia	Natala Brzykcy; Poland	Oksana Kravchenko; Ukraine
Women Team	Ukraine (UKR); Kateryna Avdieieva, Kseniia Dovbyshchuk, Mariia Korniichuk, Oksana Kravchenko, Maryna Pogorelova, Kateryna Shepeliuk, Anna Shostak	Russia (RUS); Jenny Chamyyan, Natalia Borisovna Drozdova, Zhanna Kuznetsova, Chayana Oorzhak, Mila Slepysheva, Elena Svincova, Inna Tanasheva, Liana Timasheva, Anna Tkachenko, Elizaveta Trushchenko	South Korea (KOR); Choi Sun Hee, Hong Eunmi, Lee Jin Hee
Women Team	Ukraine (UKR); Kateryna Avdieieva, Kseniia Dovbyshchuk, Mariia Korniichuk, Oksana Kravchenko, Maryna Pogorelova, Kateryna Shepeliuk, Anna Shostak	Russia (RUS); Jenny Chamyyan, Natalia Borisovna Drozdova, Zhanna Kuznetsova, Chayana Oorzhak, Mila Slepysheva, Elena Svincova, Inna Tanasheva, Liana Timasheva, Anna Tkachenko, Elizaveta Trushchenko	Turkey (TUR); Dilek Altun, Munife Aydın, İpek Erçin, Didem Erel, Ayşe Kesiktaş, Zehra Özbey, Serpil Yavuz

=== Mixed events ===
Event	Gold	Silver	Bronze
Mixed Kata Team	Turkey (TUR); Erkan Atatürk Sports Hall, Abdullah Sevinç	South Korea (KOR); Choi Sun Hee, Han Myeongijin	Ukraine (UKR); Vladyslav Mozyrev, Kateryna Shepeliuk

== See also ==
Judo at the Deaflympics
