= 2015 Turkish Basketball Presidential Cup =

Pınar Karşıyaka	Anadolu Efes
74	76
- Date: 7 October 2015
- Venue: Yaşar Doğu Sports Hall, Samsun

The 2015 Turkish Basketball Presidential Cup (Turkish: 2015 Erkekler Basketbol Cumhurbaşkanlığı Kupası) was the 31st edition of the Turkish Basketball Presidential Cup. The game was played on 7 October 2015 at Yaşar Doğu Sports Hall between Pınar Karşıyaka, champions of the 2014–15 Turkish Basketball League, and Anadolu Efes, winners of the 2014–15 Turkish Basketball Cup.

Anadolu Efes won the game 76-74 for their 10th title.

== Venue ==
Samsun	2015 Turkish Basketball Presidential Cup (Turkey)
Yaşar Doğu Sports Hall	2015 Turkish Basketball Presidential Cup (Turkey)
Capacity: 7,500	2015 Turkish Basketball Presidential Cup (Turkey)

== Match details ==
7 October 2015	Pınar Karşıyaka	74–76	Anadolu Efes	Samsun
19:30 EEST (UTC+3)	Scoring by quarter: 12–26, 18–11, 22–17, 22–22
	Pts: Carter 26; Rebs: Gabriel 10; Asts: Carter 4 PIR: Carter 27	Boxscore	Pts: Batuk 18; Rebs: Dunston 8 Asts: Heurtel 6 PIR: Dunston 21	Arena: Yaşar Doğu Sports Hall; Referees: Mehmet Keseratar, Murat Biricik, Osman Sinan İşgüder

2015 Turkish Presidential Cup champions
Anadolu Efes
(10th title)
