= Volleyball at the 2017 Summer Deaflympics =

Deaflympics event

- Venue: Hasan Doğan Sports Hall; Mustafa Dağıstanlı Sports Hall
- Location: Turkey, Samsun
- Dates: 19–28 July

Champions
- Men: Turkey
- Women: Japan

Volleyball for both men and women was contested in the 2017 Summer Deaflympics from July 19-July 28. Hasan Doğan Sports Hall and Mustafa Dağıstanlı Sports Hall were selected as the venues for hosting the volleyball matches.

In the Men's volleyball, hosts Turkey defeated Ukraine in the final to clinch the gold medal and in the Women's volleyball Japan defeated Italy to claim the gold medal.

8 teams each for both Men's Volleyball and Women's Volleyball were qualified to play in the Group matches

== Medal summary ==
* Host nation (Turkey)

Rank	NOC	Gold	Silver	Bronze	Total
1	Ukraine (UKR)	2	2	1	5
2	Japan (JPN)	1	0	0	1
2	Turkey (TUR)*	1	0	0	1
4	Italy (ITA)	0	1	0	1
4	Lithuania (LTU)	0	1	0	1
6	Russia (RUS)	0	0	2	2
7	United States (USA)	0	0	1	1
Totals (7 entries)		4	4	4	12

== Medalists ==
=== Indoor volleyball ===
Event	Gold	Silver	Bronze
Men	Turkey; Hilmi Kaan Çiçek; Emrullah Palaz; Mehmet Kuzucu; Furkan Genç; Cevat Şimşek; Rıdvan Karatas; Hasan Yasan; Kadir Akyıldız; Ahmet Metin Razbonyali; Fatih Yiğiter; Ozan Yagız; Kerim Karabıcak; Metin İmdat; Ersin Hayta	Ukraine; Oleg Antonyuk; Olexandr Biloblots'ky; Oleksii Koshkarov; Illia Nikiforov; Oleksandr Poltoratskyi; Oleksandr Prokhorchuk; Valerii Radchenko; Dmytrii Renkas; Yegor Tsymovskyy; Ihor Zahorodnii; Igor Zavirukha; Volodymyr Zelenskyi	Russia; Vladimir Buleiko; Maxim Ivanovich Salmin; Alexander Yuryevich Kudryashov; Pavel Romantsov; Stanislav Sinelnikov; Aleksey Petrochenko; Andrey Vesnin; Georgy Pleshkevich; Dmitrii Elizov; Sergey Nikolaevich Okunev; Vladimir Shmygin; Alexander Shuvaev; Kirill Komarov; Roman Simanovskiy
Women	Japan; Saki Ugaya; Nozomi Yamasaki; Sanae Miura; Nami Maejima; Miki Takara; Rie Azumi; Nanako Hata; Rena Muraki; Aimi Ozuka; Yumi Haseyuma; Mio Nakata; Sayuri Hiraoka	Italy; Alice Tomat; Alice Calcagni; Ilaria Galbusera; Claudia Gennaro; Valentina Broggi; Luana Martone; Silvia Bennardo; Federica Biasin; Vanessa Caboni; Clara Casini; Simona Brandani; Federica Bruni	United States; Kali LeAnn Frowick; Adele Daniels; Katelyn Dee Reese; Ann Whited; Darriyan Thomas; Ludmila Mounty-Weinstock; Jaime Lynn Kons; Megan E Dippold; Sarah Tubert; Abby Garrity; Cali Bunn

=== Beach volleyball ===
Event	Gold	Silver	Bronze
Men	Ukraine (UKR); Mykola Tsapkalenko; Anton Koshkarov	Ukraine (UKR); Dmytro Donchenko; Serhii Tarasov	Russia (RUS); Rushan Dayanov; Maxim Selyutin
Women	Ukraine (UKR); Anna Zatylkina; Raisa Rylova	Lithuania (LTU); Birute Aleknaviciute; Ingrida Milkintaite	Ukraine (UKR); Yuliia Yaroshevska; Yuliia Chernenko

== Men's indoor competition ==
=== Group stage ===
==== Group A ====
Pos	Team	Pld	W	L	Pts	Qualification
1	Turkey (H)	4	4	0	11	Quarterfinals
2	Italy	4	3	1	10	Quarterfinals
3	Japan	4	2	2	5	Quarterfinals
4	Brazil	4	1	3	2	Quarterfinals
5	Venezuela	4	0	4	2	

==== Group B ====
Pos	Team	Pld	W	L	Pts	Qualification
1	Ukraine	4	4	0	11	Quarterfinals
2	Russia	4	3	1	9	Quarterfinals
3	Iran	4	2	2	7	Quarterfinals
4	United States	4	1	3	3	Quarterfinals
5	Poland	4	0	4	0	

=== Knockout stage ===
==== Elimination ====
Quarterfinals
25 July
Turkey	3
United States	0
25 July
Iran	3
Italy	2
25 July
Russia	3
Japan	0
25 July
Ukraine	3
Brazil	0

Semifinals
27 July
Turkey	3
Iran	1
27 July
Ukraine	3
Russia	1

Gold medal
28 July
Turkey	3
Ukraine	0
Bronze medal
28 July
Russia	3
Iran	1

==== Classification ====
5th–8th place semi-finals
26 July
Italy	3
United States	1
26 July
Brazil	3
Japan	2

5th place match
27 July
Brazil	3
Italy	2
7th place match
27 July
Japan	3
United States	1

== Women's indoor competition ==
=== Group stage ===
==== Group A ====
Pos	Team	Pld	W	L	Pts	Qualification
1	Japan	4	4	0	12	Quarterfinals
2	Italy	4	3	1	9	Quarterfinals
3	Russia	4	2	2	6	Quarterfinals
4	Turkey (H)	4	1	3	3	Quarterfinals
5	Canada	4	0	4	0	

==== Group B ====
Pos	Team	Pld	W	L	Pts	Qualification
1	United States	3	3	0	9	Quarterfinals
2	Ukraine	3	2	1	6	Quarterfinals
3	Poland	3	1	2	2	Quarterfinals
4	Brazil	3	0	3	1	Quarterfinals

=== Knockout stage ===
==== Elimination ====
Quarter-finals
25 July
Japan	3
Brazil	0
25 July
Ukraine	3
Russia	1
25 July
Italy	3
Poland	0
25 July
United States	3
Turkey	0

Semi-finals
27 July
Japan	3
Ukraine	0
27 July
Italy	3
United States	0

Gold medal
28 July
Japan	3
Italy	0
Bronze medal
28 July
United States	3
Ukraine	0

==== Classification ====
5th–8th place semi-finals
26 July
Russia	3
Brazil	2
26 July
Poland	3
Turkey	0

5th place match
27 July
Russia	3
Poland	0
7th place match
27 July
Turkey	3
Brazil	1
