= Spain at the 2017 Summer Deaflympics =

- IPC code: ESP
- NPC: Spanish Federation of Sports for the Deaf
- Website: www.feds.es

in Samsun
- Competitors: 18 in 4 sports
- Medals Ranked 44th: Gold 0 Silver 0 Bronze 1 Total 1

Summer Deaflympics appearances (overview)
- 1924; 1928; 1931; 1935; 1939; 1949; 1953; 1957; 1961; 1965; 1969; 1973; 1977; 1981; 1985; 1989; 1993; 1997; 2001; 2005; 2009; 2013; 2017; 2021

Spain competed at the Summer Deaflympics for the twelfth time since making its debut in 1957. Spain sent a delegation consisting of 18 competitors for the multi-sport event. 18 competitors competed in 4 different sports namely; cycling, bowling, Athletics and swimming.

Jaime Morga Martnez claimed the only medal for Spain during the event by clinching bronze medal in the men's 800m individual event.

== Medalists ==
Name	Medal	Sport	Event
Jaime Morga Martnez	Bronze	Athletics	Men's 800m
