= Suslaidy Girat =

Cuban athlete (born 1987)

Personal information
- Full name: Suslaidy Girat Rivero
- Nationality: Cuban
- Born: 19 August 1987 (age 38)

Sport
- Country: Cuba
- Sport: Women's Athletics
Medal record
Event / 1st / 2nd / 3rd; Deaflympics / 6 / 1 / 1
Deaflympics
Gold medal – first place	Taipei 2009	100m
Gold medal – first place	Taipei 2009	long jump
Gold medal – first place	Sofia 2013	100m
Gold medal – first place	Sofia 2013	triple jump
Gold medal – first place	Samsun 2017	100m
Gold medal – first place	Samsun 2017	triple jump
Silver medal – second place	Samsun 2017	long jump
Bronze medal – third place	Taipei 2009	200m
ALBA Games
Gold medal – first place	Barquisimeto 2011	long jump

Suslaidy Girat Rivero (Note: In this Spanish name, the first or paternal surname is Girat and the second or maternal family name is Rivero.) (born 19 August 1987) is a Cuban female deaf track and field athlete. She has competed at the Deaflympics in 2009, 2013 and in 2017 representing Cuba. Suslaidy Girat has won 8 medals in the Deaflympics including 6 gold medals and set the landmark for becoming the finest ever Cuban to have competed at the Deaflympics.

In the 2013 Summer Deaflympics, she broke the world record in the 100m individual competition for the deaf (women) with a timing of 11.71 seconds.

She also holds some unique records in Deaflympics for women in athletics such as 100m (11.71 seconds), long jump (6.13 seconds), triple jump (13.60 seconds).
