= Basketball at the 2017 Summer Deaflympics =

Deaflympics event

- Venue: Yaşar Doğu Sport Hall; Bahattin Ekinci Sports Hall
- Location: Turkey, Samsun
- Dates: 19–29 July

Champions
- Men: Lithuania
- Women: Greece

Basketball was contested for both men and women in the 2017 Summer Deaflympics from July 19-July 29. Yaşar Doğu Sport Hall and Bahattin Ekinci Sports Hall which are located at Samsun, Turkey were the venues selected to host the basketball matches.

Lithuania won the gold medal for the Men's Category by defeating Venezuela with 70–64.

In the women's Category, Greece defeated Lithuania in the final with 67–50.

== Men's tournament ==
=== Group stage ===
==== Group A ====
Pos	Team	Pld	W	L	PF	PA	PD	Pts	Qualification
1	Lithuania	5	5	0	418	262	156	10	Quarterfinals
2	Venezuela	5	4	1	408	295	113	8	Quarterfinals
3	Greece	5	2	3	328	238	90	4	Quarterfinals
4	Turkey	5	2	3	338	353	(-15)	4	Quarterfinals
5	Poland	5	2	3	373	396	(-23)	4	
6	Chinese Taipei	5	0	5	214	473	(-259)	0	

==== Group B ====
Pos	Team	Pld	W	L	PF	PA	PD	Pts	Qualification
1	Ukraine	5	5	0	328	251	77	10	Quarterfinals
2	Russia	5	4	1	414	300	114	9	Quarterfinals
3	Argentina	5	3	3	342	349	(-7)	8	Quarterfinals
4	Slovenia	5	2	3	381	315	66	7	Quarterfinals
5	Australia	5	1	4	317	296	21	6	
6	Kenya	5	0	5	163	434	(-271)	5	

=== Knockout stage ===
==== Elimination ====
Quarterfinals
25 July
Greece	71
Russia	61
25 July
Lithuania	80
Slovenia	74
25 July
Venezuela	77
Argentina	67
25 July
Ukraine	72
Turkey	57

Semifinals
27 July
Lithuania	63
Greece	40
27 July
Venezuela	49
Ukraine	33

Gold medal
29 July
Lithuania	70
Venezuela	64
Bronze medal
29 July
Ukraine	63
Greece	57

==== Classification ====
5th to 8th place semi-finals
27 July
Slovenia	89
Russia	64
27 July
Argentina	86
Turkey	68

5th-place match
29 July
Argentina	83
Slovenia	78
7th-place match
29 July
Russia	80
Turkey	79

== Women's tournament ==
=== Group stage ===
==== Group A ====
Pos	Team	Pld	W	L	PF	PA	PD	Pts	Qualification
1	Lithuania	4	4	0	299	172	127	8	Quarterfinals
2	Italy	4	3	1	223	228	(-5)	7	Quarterfinals
3	Poland	4	2	2	185	177	8	6	Quarterfinals
4	China	4	1	3	211	282	(-71)	5	Quarterfinals
5	Russia	4	0	4	218	277	(-59)	4	

==== Group B ====
Pos	Team	Pld	W	L	PF	PA	PD	Pts	Qualification
1	Greece	3	3	0	180	93	87	6	Quarterfinals
2	Ukraine	3	2	1	197	126	71	5	Quarterfinals
3	Turkey	3	1	2	187	130	57	4	Quarterfinals
4	Kenya	3	0	3	56	271	(-215)	3	Quarterfinals

=== Knockout stage ===
==== Elimination ====
Quarterfinals
25 July
Ukraine	60
Poland	33
25 July
Lithuania	100
Kenya	12
25 July
Italy	53
Turkey	45
25 July
Greece	64
China	51

Semifinals
27 July
Lithuania	63
Ukraine	40
27 July
Greece	49
Italy	33

Gold medal
29 July
Greece	67
Lithuania	50
Bronze medal
29 July
Italy	53
Ukraine	52

==== Classification ====
5th to 8th-place semifinals
26 July
Poland	93
Kenya	22
26 July
Turkey	83
China	65

5th-place match
27 July
Turkey	59
Poland	39
7th-place match
27 July
China	92
Kenya	22

== Medal summary ==
* Host nation (Turkey)

Rank	NOC	Gold	Silver	Bronze	Total
1	Lithuania (LTU)	1	1	0	2
2	Greece (GRE)	1	0	0	1
3	Venezuela (VEN)	0	1	0	1
4	Italy (ITA)	0	0	1	1
4	Ukraine (UKR)	0	0	1	1
Totals (5 entries)		2	2	2	6

== Medalists ==
Event	Gold	Silver	Bronze
Men's team	Lithuania (LTU); Laurynas Sankauskas, Arunas Kubilius, Justinas Navlickas, Arvydas Bareikis, Lukas Guzauskas, Martynas Vainius, Robertas Puzinas, Mantvydas Vaiciulis, Lukas Laurinaitis, Gediminas Zukas, Karolis Birieta, Andrej Zenevic	Venezuela (VEN); Carlos Usain Pacheco, Carlos Jose Escalona, Jhonny Jimenez, Bryan Alexander Catari Quintero, Jose Rafael Ojeda Rengifo, Miguel Angel Blanco Briceno, Luis Enrique Romero Izaguirre, Yorman Enrique Sanz Palacios, Roger Alberto Crespo Colmenarez, Felix Alberto Perdomo Rodriguez, Juan Leon, Wilson Fernando Avila Flores	Ukraine (UKR); Oleksandr Fomenko, Yehor Kropyvianskyi, Dmytro Melnychenko; Maksym Kim, Iurii Stryzhevskyi, Oleksandr Didenko, Pavlo Riazantsev, Oleksandr Kuznetsov, Stanislav Shesterykov, Serhiy Bukin, Kyrylo Yakovliev, Andrii Raus
Women's team	Greece (GRE); Chrysanthi Chaina, Evangelia Sarakatsani, Lamprini Ioannis Agagiotou, Stavroula Kotsirea, Alexandra Spinou, Dimitra Mellini, Chrysanthi Verani, Ioanna Voudouri, Alexandra Kotsiafti, Stefania Patera, Konstantina Balkoglou	Lithuania (LTU); Grazina Jocyte, Jurgita Jankute Meskine, Deimante Naruseviciute, Agne Zegyte, Justina Burbaite-Maciuliene, Ausra Milasauskaite, Sonata Bareikiene, Gabriele Valaityte, Jurgita Segzdaite, Ramune Eskertaite, Domante Serelyte, Eliza Dobilaite	Italy (ITA); Noemi Viana, Benedetta Galimberti, Viola Strazzari, Martina Benincasa, Giulia Sautariello, Simona Cascio, Francesca Clorinda Gironi, Anna Bonomi, Simona Sorrentino, Sara Canali, Chiara Chiosi
