= Bowling at the 2017 Summer Deaflympics =

Deaflympics event

Bowling at the 2017 Summer Deaflympics took place at the Samsun Bowling Hall.

== Medal summary ==
* Host nation (Turkey)

Rank	NOC	Gold	Silver	Bronze	Total
1	South Korea (KOR)	6	8	7	21
2	Chinese Taipei (TPE)	2	0	1	3
3	Ukraine (UKR)	1	2	1	4
4	Russia (RUS)	1	1	8	10
5	Germany (GER)	1	1	0	2
6	Singapore (SGP)	1	0	1	2
7	France (FRA)	0	0	2	2
8	Czech Republic (CZE)	0	0	1	1
8	Italy (ITA)	0	0	1	1
Totals (9 entries)		12	12	22	46

== Medalists ==
Event	Gold	Silver	Bronze
Women All Events	Kim Ji Eun; South Korea	Park Sunok; South Korea	Olga Valeryevna Lotina; Russia
Women Master	Adelia Naomi Yokoyama; Singapore	Kim Ji Eun; South Korea	Katerina Janoscova; Czech Republic
Women Master	Adelia Naomi Yokoyama; Singapore	Kim Ji Eun; South Korea	Hwee Kimberly Quek; Singapore
Women Singles	Park Sunok; South Korea	Kim Ji Eun; South Korea	Choi Seonkyeong; South Korea
Women Singles	Park Sunok; South Korea	Kim Ji Eun; South Korea	Kim Taisoon; South Korea
Women Doubles	Russia (RUS); Nadezda Georgievna Korablinova, Olga Valeryevna Lotina	South Korea (KOR); Kim Ji Eun; Kim Taisoon	South Korea (KOR); Lee Chanmi; Park Sunok
Women Doubles	Russia (RUS); Nadezda Georgievna Korablinova, Olga Valeryevna Lotina	South Korea (KOR); Kim Ji Eun; Kim Taisoon	Chinese Taipei (TPE); Hsueh Hsiu-Chen; Lin Ya-Chin
Women Trios	Ukraine (UKR); Alla Diachenko; Kateryna Kovalchuk; Daryna Velychko	South Korea (KOR); Cho Sanghee; Kim Taisoon; Lee Chanmi	South Korea (KOR); Choi Seonkyeong; Kim Jieun; Park Sunok
Women Trios	Ukraine (UKR); Alla Diachenko; Kateryna Kovalchuk; Daryna Velychko	South Korea (KOR); Cho Sanghee; Kim Taisoon; Lee Chanmi	Russia (RUS); Nadezda Georgievna Korablinova, Olga Valeryevna Lotina, Dina Viktorowna Parits
Women Team of Five	Chinese Taipei (TPE); Chang Yao-Chien, Chen I-Miao, Hsueh Hsiu-Chen, Huang Shu-Min, Lin Ya-Chin, Wang Yu-Chin	South Korea (KOR); Cho Sanghee, Choi Seonkyeong, Kim Jieun, Kim Taisoon, Lee Chanmi, Park Sunok	Russia (RUS); Nadezda Georgievna Korablinova, Olga Valeryevna Lotina, Daria Andreevna Makarova, Marina Viktorowna Makarova, Dina Viktorowna Parits, Svetlana Dmitrievna Zhuravlena
Women Team of Five	Chinese Taipei (TPE); Chang Yao-Chien, Chen I-Miao, Hsueh Hsiu-Chen, Huang Shu-Min, Lin Ya-Chin, Wang Yu-Chin	South Korea (KOR); Cho Sanghee, Choi Seonkyeong, Kim Jieun, Kim Taisoon, Lee Chanmi, Park Sunok	Ukraine (UKR); Olena Boltovnina, Alla Diachenko, Kateryna Kovalchuk, Lyudmyla Trubina, Daryna Vlychko, Anzhelika Zhukova
Men All Events	An Seongio; South Korea	Seo Youngchun; South Korea	Vladimir Grigoryev; Russia
Men Master	Seo Youngchun; South Korea	An Seongio; South Korea	Ludovic Bartout; France
Men Master	Seo Youngchun; South Korea	An Seongio; South Korea	Arsen Arturovich Akopyan; Russia
Men singles	Chang Li-Hsiao; Chinese Taipei	Vladimir Grigoryev; Russia	Davide Sacchi; Italy
Men singles	Chang Li-Hsiao; Chinese Taipei	Vladimir Grigoryev; Russia	Yeo Youngwook; South Korea
Men Doubles	South Korea (KOR); An Seongio; Seo Youngchun	Germany (GER); Sebastian Klotz; Andreas Schwarz	South Korea (KOR); Kim Younho; Son Jeongyong
Men Doubles	South Korea (KOR); An Seongio; Seo Youngchun	Germany (GER); Sebastian Klotz; Andreas Schwarz	Russia (RUS); Arsen Arturovich Akopyan; Alexey V. Drozhbin
Men Trios	South Korea (KOR); An Seongjo; Kim Jisu; Seo Youngchun	Ukraine (UKR); Vadym Danyliuk; Vladyslav Ialovega; Rostyslav Maiier	France (FRA); Ludovic Bartout; Didier Boulle; Frederic Delsol
Men Trios	South Korea (KOR); An Seongjo; Kim Jisu; Seo Youngchun	Ukraine (UKR); Vadym Danyliuk; Vladyslav Ialovega; Rostyslav Maiier	Russia (RUS); Vladimir Grigoryev; Maxim Khomudyarov; Dmitry Lywowitsch Kuznetsov
Men Team of Five	Germany (GER); Daniel Duda, Thomas Fenselau, Sebastian Klotz, Kevin Jean Lindemann, Rene Schulz, Andreas Schwarz	Ukraine (UKR); Vadym Danyliuk, Nazar Didorenko, Vladyslav Ialovega, Rostyslav Maiier, Dmytro Shcherbakov, Sergiy Trubin	South Korea (KOR); An Seongjo, Kim Jisu, Kim Younho, Seo Youngchun, Son Jeongyong, Yeo Youngwook
Men Team of Five	Germany (GER); Daniel Duda, Thomas Fenselau, Sebastian Klotz, Kevin Jean Lindemann, Rene Schulz, Andreas Schwarz	Ukraine (UKR); Vadym Danyliuk, Nazar Didorenko, Vladyslav Ialovega, Rostyslav Maiier, Dmytro Shcherbakov, Sergiy Trubin	Russia (RUS); Arsen Arturovich Akopyan, Alexey V. Drozhbin, Vladimir Grigoryev, Maxim Khomudyarov, Dmitry Lywowitsch Kuznetsov, Alexey Savchenko
