= Singapore at the 2017 Summer Deaflympics =

- IOC code: SGP
- National federation: Deaf Sports Association Singapore
- Website: www.dsa.org.sg

in Samsun 18 – 30 July 2017
- Competitors: 5
- Medals Ranked 29th: Gold 1 Silver 0 Bronze 1 Total 2

Summer Deaflympics appearances (overview)
- 2001; 2005; 2009; 2013; 2017; 2021

Singapore competed in the 2017 Summer Deaflympics which was held in Samsun, Turkey after narrowly missing the opportunity to compete at the 2013 Summer Deaflympics. Singapore sent a delegation consisting of 5 participants for the event. This was only the fourth time that Singapore was eligible participate at the Summer Deaflympics after making its Deaflympic debut in 2001.

== Medalists ==
Medal	Name	Sport	Event	Date
Gold	Adelia Naomi Yokoyama	Bowling	Women masters	29 July
Bronze	Hwee Kimberly Quek	Bowling	Women masters	29 July

== Medal table ==
Sport	Gold	Silver	Bronze	Total
Bowling	1	0	1	2
