= Taekwondo at the 2017 Summer Deaflympics =

Deaflympics event

- Venue: Atatürk Sports Hall
- Location: Turkey, Samsun
- Dates: 27–30 July

Taekwondo at the 2017 Summer Deaflympics in Samsun, Turkey took place at Atatürk Sports Hall in Canik.

== Medal summary ==
* Host nation (Turkey)

Rank	NOC	Gold	Silver	Bronze	Total
1	Turkey (TUR)*	4	3	3	10
2	South Korea (KOR)	4	3	1	8
3	Russia (RUS)	3	3	6	12
4	Iran (IRI)	1	1	5	7
5	Kazakhstan (KAZ)	1	0	1	2
6	Croatia (CRO)	0	2	0	2
7	Ukraine (UKR)	0	1	0	1
8	China (CHN)	0	0	4	4
9	Chinese Taipei (TPE)	0	0	2	2
9	Greece (GRE)	0	0	2	2
11	Kyrgyzstan (KGZ)	0	0	1	1
11	Venezuela (VEN)	0	0	1	1
Totals (12 entries)		13	13	26	52

== Medalists ==
=== Poomsae ===
==== Men ====
Event	Gold	Silver	Bronze
Individual	Ali Karaca; Turkey	Choi Hyeseong; South Korea	Stepan Ayvazyan; Russia
Individual	Ali Karaca; Turkey	Choi Hyeseong; South Korea	Zheng Jiajun; China
Team	South Korea; Choi Hyeseong; Lim Daeho; Woo Changbeom	Turkey; Ibrahim Atamer; Zeki Caliskan; Ali Karaca	China; Zhang Yongdai; Zheng Jiajun; Zhu Zhengjiao
Team	South Korea; Choi Hyeseong; Lim Daeho; Woo Changbeom	Turkey; Ibrahim Atamer; Zeki Caliskan; Ali Karaca	Russia; Stepan Ayvazyan; Suradzh Dzhumabaev; Anton Vladimirovich Kovtunov

==== Women ====
Event	Gold	Silver	Bronze
Individual	Park Hye Jeong; South Korea	Ayse Gul Gokkaya; Turkey	Maryam Khodabandeh; Iran
Individual	Park Hye Jeong; South Korea	Ayse Gul Gokkaya; Turkey	Iuliia Ovchinnikova; Russia
Team	Turkey; Ayse Gul Gokkaya; Aslihan Savan; Elif Yenigun	South Korea; Kim Heehwa; Lee Jin Young; Park Hye Jeong	China; Li Yingyi; Liu Junna; Wang Ke
Team	Turkey; Ayse Gul Gokkaya; Aslihan Savan; Elif Yenigun	South Korea; Kim Heehwa; Lee Jin Young; Park Hye Jeong	Russia; Anastasia Sergeevna Kuznetsova; Daria Naumenko-Kravchenko; Iuliia Ovchinnikova

==== Mixed ====
Event	Gold	Silver	Bronze
Pair	South Korea; Choi Hyeseong; Park Hye Jeong	Russia; Stepan Ayvazyan; Daria Naumenko-Kravchenko	Chinese Taipei; Peng Szu-Ting; Sun Shu-Liang
Pair	South Korea; Choi Hyeseong; Park Hye Jeong	Russia; Stepan Ayvazyan; Daria Naumenko-Kravchenko	Turkey; Ibrahim Atamer; Aslihan Savan

=== Kyorugi ===
==== Men ====
Event	Gold	Silver	Bronze
58kg	Ayan Abdrash; Kazakhstan	Vadym Boiaryn; Ukraine	Kazbek Latipov; Russia
58kg	Ayan Abdrash; Kazakhstan	Vadym Boiaryn; Ukraine	Pavlos Liotsos; Greece
68kg	Aleksei Zastrozhin; Russia	Muhammed Guler; Turkey	Behzad Amiri; Iran
68kg	Aleksei Zastrozhin; Russia	Muhammed Guler; Turkey	Azamat Mavlonov; Kyrgyzstan
80kg	Lee Hakseong; South Korea	Shamil Isakov; Russia	Batuhan Simsek; Turkey
80kg	Lee Hakseong; South Korea	Shamil Isakov; Russia	Mohammad Zaferani; Iran
+80kg	Aleksandr Vladimirovich Barkalov; Russia	Lim Daeho; South Korea	Osman Gecit; Turkey
+80kg	Aleksandr Vladimirovich Barkalov; Russia	Lim Daeho; South Korea	Masoud Razzaghi; Iran

==== Women ====
Event	Gold	Silver	Bronze
49kg	Merve Yazici; Turkey	Evelina Karpinskaia; Russia	Fatemeh Montazeri Saniji; Iran
49kg	Merve Yazici; Turkey	Evelina Karpinskaia; Russia	Peng Szu-Ting; Chinese Taipei
57kg	Marina Igorevna Drozdova; Russia	Matea Kolovrat; Croatia	Lee Jin Young; South Korea
57kg	Marina Igorevna Drozdova; Russia	Matea Kolovrat; Croatia	Stefani Maria Ortega Salcedo; Venezuela
67kg	Noseybeh Shahbazi; Iran	Sara Rajcevic; Croatia	Maria Fouledaki; Greece
67kg	Noseybeh Shahbazi; Iran	Sara Rajcevic; Croatia	Ekaterina Polukhina; Russia
+67kg	Selver Seker; Turkey	Mouna Shiritazehgheshlagh; Iran	Valentina Antonenko; Kazakhstan
+67kg	Selver Seker; Turkey	Mouna Shiritazehgheshlagh; Iran	Xu Xiaohong; China
