= Cycling at the 2017 Summer Deaflympics =

Deaflympics event

Cycling at the 2017 Summer Deaflympics in Samsun consisted of two disciplines: Mountain bike racing and Road bicycle racing. Mountain bike racing was held at Ondokuz Mayıs University mountain bike trail on 24 July 2017, while road bicycle racing was held at 19 Mayis District in Ondokuzmayıs from 19 to 25 July 2017.

== Medal summary ==
* Host nation (Turkey)

Rank	NOC	Gold	Silver	Bronze	Total
1	Russia (RUS)	7	4	4	15
2	Venezuela (VEN)	1	3	0	4
3	China (CHN)	1	2	1	4
4	Slovakia (SVK)	1	1	1	3
5	Japan (JPN)	0	0	2	2
6	France (FRA)	0	0	1	1
6	Germany (GER)	0	0	1	1
Totals (7 entries)		10	10	10	30

== Medalists ==
=== Road cycling ===
Event	Gold	Silver	Bronze
Men's 1000m sprint	Ilia Sergeyevich Gutenev; Russia	Liang Qichao; China	Steeve Touboul; France
Men's Individual Road Race	Dimitry Andreevich Rozanov; Russia	Ivan Vladimirovich Makarov; Russia	Adrian Babic; Slovakia
Men's Individual Time Trial	Dimitry Andreevich Rozanov; Russia	Adrian Babic; Slovakia	Ivan Vladimirovich Makarov; Russia
Men's Points Race	Dimitry Andreevich Rozanov; Russia	Evgeny Mikhailovich Prokhorov; Russia	Alexander Ilinykh; Russia
Women's 1000m sprint	Alisa Viktorovna Bondavera; Russia	Ludy Nava Correa; Venezuela	Mao Anan; China
Women's Individual Road Race	Xu Xiaowen; China	Ludy Nava Correa; Venezuela	Aleksandra Evdokimova; Russia
Women's Individual Time Trial	Alisa Viktorovna Bondavera; Russia	Ludy Nava Correa; Venezuela	Yukari Minohara; Japan
Women's Points Race	Ludy Nava Correa; Venezuela	Xu Xiaowen; China	Isabelle-Sophie Boberg; Germany

=== Mountain biking ===
Event	Gold	Silver	Bronze
Men's Cross-country	Adrian Babic; Slovakia	Alexander Ilinykh; Russia	Aleksei Kudrin; Russia
Women's Cross-country	Ksenia Kalibina; Russia	Marina Islamova; Russia	Kumi Hayase; Japan
