= Bafra Stadium =

Football stadium in Bafra, Samsun, Turkey

- Bafra Stadyumu
- Location of the stadium in Turkey.
- Address: Gazi Paşa Mah. Stad Cad., Bafra
- Location: Bafra, Samsun, Turkey
- Coordinates: 41°34′20″N 35°54′43″E
- Capacity: 5,000

Construction
- Groundbreaking: February 12, 2014
- Opened: August 30, 2014; 12 years ago
- Cost: ₺ 8.855 million (approx. US$ 4.1 million)

Tenant
- 2017 Summer Deaflympics

Bafra Stadium, also known as the New City Stadium of Bafra, (Turkish: Bafra Stadyumu or Bafra Yeni Şehir Stadyumu) is a football stadium located in Bafra district of Samsun Province, northern Turkey.

The stadium is situated in Stad Cad. of Gazi Paşa neighborhood in Bafra. It is the home ground of 1930 Bafraspor, which play in the Regional Amateur League. Groundbreaking for the construction of the sports hall took place on February 12, 2014. It was opened on August 30, 2014. A pitch of artificial turf is annexed to the stadium. The construction cost ₺ 8.855 million (approx. US$4.1 million). The venue has a seating capacity for 5,000 spectators. It replaced the old stadium, which was built between 1974 and 1978, and demolished in 2017 after serving 39 years.

== International events hosted ==
The venue hosted the football events of the 2017 Summer Deaflympics.
