= Table tennis at the 2017 Summer Deaflympics =

Deaflympics event

- Venue: İlkadım Archery Sports Hall
- Location: Turkey, Samsun
- Dates: 20–27 July

Table tennis at the 2017 Summer Deaflympics in Samsun, Turkey took place at İlkadım Archery Sports Hall.

== Medal summary ==
| Rank | NOC | Gold | Silver | Bronze | Total |
|---|---|---|---|---|---|
| 1 | China (CHN) | 7 | 3 | 2 | 12 |
| 2 | Chinese Taipei (TPE) | 0 | 2 | 1 | 3 |
| 3 | Ukraine (UKR) | 0 | 1 | 3 | 4 |
| 4 | Slovakia (SVK) | 0 | 1 | 1 | 2 |
| 5 | Japan (JPN) | 0 | 0 | 2 | 2 |
| 5 | Lithuania (LTU) | 0 | 0 | 2 | 2 |
| 5 | Russia (RUS) | 0 | 0 | 2 | 2 |
| 8 | Kazakhstan (KAZ) | 0 | 0 | 1 | 1 |
| Totals (8 entries) | | 7 | 7 | 14 | 28 |

== Medalists ==
| Event | Gold | Silver | Bronze |
|---|---|---|---|
| Men's singles | Wang Cong; China | Thomas Keinath; Slovakia | Wang Yi-Hsiang; Chinese Taipei |
| Men's singles | Wang Cong; China | Thomas Keinath; Slovakia | Gennadii Zakladnyi; Ukraine |
| Men's doubles | China; Wang Cong; Zhang Chaoyue | Chinese Taipei; Wang Yi-Hsiang; Yang Jung-Tsung | China; Tian Jiping; Xu Youyue |
| Men's doubles | China; Wang Cong; Zhang Chaoyue | Chinese Taipei; Wang Yi-Hsiang; Yang Jung-Tsung | Lithuania; Gintautas Juchna; Deividas Takinas |
| Women's singles | Huang Meng Ping; China | Shi Ce; China | Wang Zhe; China |
| Women's singles | Huang Meng Ping; China | Shi Ce; China | Anna Alexandrovna Kondratova; Russia |
| Women's doubles | China; Huang Meng Ping; Shi Ce | China; Lin Huan; Wang Zhe | Japan; Riho Kamezawa; Mizue Kawasaki |
| Women's doubles | China; Huang Meng Ping; Shi Ce | China; Lin Huan; Wang Zhe | Ukraine; Mariia Vasylieva; Karyna Zavinovska |
| Mixed doubles | China; Shi Ce; Wang Cong | China; Huang Meng Ping; Tian Jiping | Slovakia; Eva Jurkova; Thomas Keinath |
| Mixed doubles | China; Shi Ce; Wang Cong | China; Huang Meng Ping; Tian Jiping | Ukraine; Iuliia Khodko; Gennadii Zakladnyi |
| Men's team | China; Tian Jiping; Wang Cong; Xu Youyue; Zhang Chaoyue | Chinese Taipei; Kuo Yueh-Tung; Lu Shih-Chieh; Wang Yi-Hsiang; Yang Jung-Tsung | Kazakhstan; Gaip Daniyarov; Daniyar Iskendirov; Kanat Konkubayev |
| Men's team | China; Tian Jiping; Wang Cong; Xu Youyue; Zhang Chaoyue | Chinese Taipei; Kuo Yueh-Tung; Lu Shih-Chieh; Wang Yi-Hsiang; Yang Jung-Tsung | Lithuania; Gintautas Juchna; Viktoras Narkevicius; Deividas Takinas; Kestutis Ziziunas |
| Women's team | China; Huang Meng Ping; Lin Huan; Shi Ce; Wang Zhe | Ukraine; Iuliia Khodko; Larysa Starikova; Mariia Vasylieva; Karyna Zavinovska | Japan; Riho Kamezawa; Mizue Kawasaki; Risato Takaoka |
| Women's team | China; Huang Meng Ping; Lin Huan; Shi Ce; Wang Zhe | Ukraine; Iuliia Khodko; Larysa Starikova; Mariia Vasylieva; Karyna Zavinovska | Russia; Diana Gubanova; Anna Alexandrovna Kondratova; Anastasiia Kudriashova; Ksenia Markovich |

== Results ==
=== Women's team ===
==== Group A ====
| Pos | Team | Pld | TW | TL | Pts | Qualification |
|---|---|---|---|---|---|---|
| 1 | China | 4 | 4 | 0 | 8 | Semi-finals |
| 2 | Japan | 4 | 3 | 1 | 7 | Semi-finals |
| 3 | India | 4 | 2 | 2 | 6 | 5th–6th place match |
| 4 | Poland | 4 | 1 | 3 | 5 | 7th–8th place match |
| 5 | Turkey | 4 | 0 | 4 | 4 | 9th–10th place match |

==== Group B ====
| Pos | Team | Pld | TW | TL | Pts | Qualification |
|---|---|---|---|---|---|---|
| 1 | Ukraine | 4 | 4 | 0 | 8 | Semi-finals |
| 2 | Russia | 4 | 3 | 1 | 7 | Semi-finals |
| 3 | South Korea | 4 | 2 | 2 | 6 | 5th–6th place match |
| 4 | Hungary | 4 | 1 | 3 | 5 | 7th–8th place match |
| 5 | Croatia | 4 | 0 | 4 | 4 | 9th–10th place match |

==== Knockout ====
Semifinals
21 July
China | 3
Russia | 1
21 July
Japan | 0
Ukraine | 3

Final
21 July
China | 3
Ukraine | 2

==== Classification ====
| 5th–6th place match |
| 21 July |
| India | 1 |
| South Korea | 3 |

| 7th–8th place match |
| 21 July |
| Poland | 1 |
| Hungary | 3 |

| 9th–10th place match |
| 21 July |
| Turkey | 3 |
| Croatia | 1 |

=== Men's team ===
==== Group A ====
| Pos | Team | Pld | TW | TL | Pts | Qualification |
|---|---|---|---|---|---|---|
| 1 | South Korea | 3 | 3 | 0 | 6 | Elimination round |
| 2 | Ukraine | 3 | 2 | 1 | 5 | Elimination round |
| 3 | Hong Kong | 3 | 1 | 2 | 4 | Classification round |
| 4 | Turkey | 3 | 0 | 3 | 3 | Classification round |

==== Group B ====
| Pos | Team | Pld | TW | TL | Pts | Qualification |
|---|---|---|---|---|---|---|
| 1 | China | 3 | 3 | 0 | 6 | Elimination round |
| 2 | Germany | 3 | 2 | 1 | 5 | Elimination round |
| 3 | Austria | 3 | 1 | 2 | 4 | Classification round |
| 4 | Thailand | 3 | 0 | 3 | 3 | Classification round |

==== Group C ====
| Pos | Team | Pld | TW | TL | Pts | Qualification |
|---|---|---|---|---|---|---|
| 1 | Lithuania | 3 | 3 | 0 | 6 | Elimination round |
| 2 | Kazakhstan | 3 | 2 | 1 | 5 | Elimination round |
| 3 | Bulgaria | 3 | 1 | 2 | 4 | Classification round |
| 4 | Poland | 3 | 0 | 3 | 3 | Classification round |

==== Group D ====
| Pos | Team | Pld | TW | TL | Pts | Qualification |
|---|---|---|---|---|---|---|
| 1 | Chinese Taipei | 3 | 3 | 0 | 6 | Elimination round |
| 2 | Russia | 3 | 2 | 1 | 5 | Elimination round |
| 3 | Czech Republic | 3 | 1 | 2 | 4 | Classification round |
| 4 | Hungary | 3 | 0 | 3 | 3 | Classification round |

==== Elimination round ====
Quarterfinals
21 July
South Korea | 1
Kazakhstan | 3
21 July
Germany | 0
Chinese Taipei | 3
21 July
Lithuania | 3
Ukraine | 1
21 July
Russia | 0
China | 3

Semifinals
21 July
Kazakhstan | 0
Chinese Taipei | 3
21 July
Lithuania | 0
China | 3

Final
21 July
Chinese Taipei | 1
China | 3

==== 5th–8th Classification round ====
5th–8th place semifinals
21 July
South Korea | 3
Germany | 1
21 July
Ukraine | 3
Russia | 1

5th place
21 July
South Korea | 2
Ukraine | 3
7th place
21 July
Germany | 0
Russia | 3

==== 9th–16th Classification round ====
9th–16th place quarterfinals
21 July
Hong Kong | 3
Poland | 0
21 July
Thailand | 0
Czech Republic | 3
21 July
Bulgaria | 3
Turkey | 0
21 July
Hungary | 0
Austria | 3

9th–12th place semifinals
21 July
Hong Kong | 3
Czech Republic | 2
21 July
Bulgaria | 0
Austria | 3

9th place
21 July
Hong Kong | 3
Austria | 1
11th place
21 July
Czech Republic | 3
Bulgaria | 1

==== 13th–16th Classification round ====
13th–16th place semifinals
21 July
Poland | 3
Thailand | 0
21 July
Turkey | 3
Hungary | 1

13th place
21 July
Poland | 0
Turkey | 3
15th place
21 July
Thailand | 2
Hungary | 3
