= Düvecik, Canik =

Düvecik
- Neighbourhood
- Location in Turkey
- Coordinates: 41.236°N 36.319°E
- Country: Turkey
- Province: Samsun
- District: Canik
- Population (2022): 1,084
- Time zone: UTC+3 (TRT)

Düvecik, is a neighbourhood in the municipality and district of Canik, Samsun Province, Turkey. Its population is 1,084 (2022).

== History ==
In accordance with Treaty of Lausanne, 105 people migrated to the district in 1931 from Chrysoupoli. These people were mostly Balkan Turks. After a while people from Samsun and nearby cities moved into the village. With the building of residential areas nearby and growing population, a Plebiscite was held on 27 December 2009. After the Plebiscite Düvecik was accepted as a neighborhood.

== Geography ==
8 kilometers away from the city center.

== Population ==
Historical population
Year	Pop.	±% p.a.
1990	1,133	—
1997	1,171	+0.47%
2007	1,300	+1.05%
2012	1,356	+0.85%
2017	1,276	−1.21%
2022	1,084	−3.21%
Source: 1990 census, 1997 census and TÜIK (2007-2022)

== Economy ==
The economy is mostly depended on agriculture and livestock. Although most of the young population prefer working in the city center.

== Infrastructure ==
There is an elementary school in the neighbourhood. Water supply network and sewer infrastructure are present in the neighbourhood. There isn't any medical facility located in Düvecik. Also, there is electricity and phone network connected to neighbourhood.
