= Bahattin Ekinci Sports Hall =

Indoor sport venue in Tekkeköy, Samsun, Turkey

- Bahattin Ekinci Spor Salonu
- Location of the sports hall in Turkey.

- Address: Samsun-Ordu Highway D.010, Tekkeköy
- Location: Tekkeköy, Samsun, Turkey
- Coordinates: 41°13′14″N 36°26′41″E

Tenant
- 2017 Summer Deaflympics

Bahattin Ekinci Sports Hall (Turkish: Bahattin Ekinci Spor Salonu) is a multi-purpose indoor sport venue located in Tekkeköy district of Samsun Province, northern Turkey. It was named in honor of a local politician and the chairman of the local football club in Tekkeköy, who died in 2011.

The venue is situated on the Samsun-Ordu Highway D.010 in Tekkeköy. It hosts basketball, volleyball, and karate competitions mostly for schools. Some group matches of the Turkish Women's Regional Volleyball League are played also in the sports hall.

== International events hosted ==
The venue will host basketball events of the 2017 Summer Deaflympics along with Yaşar Doğu Sport Hall located in the same city.
