= Mexico at the 2017 Summer Deaflympics =

Mexico at the 2017 Deaflympics
- IOC code: MEX
- NOC: Federación Mexicana de Deportes para Sordos, A.C.

in Samsun
- Competitors: 8
- Medals Ranked 31st: Gold 1 Silver 0 Bronze 0 Total 1

Summer appearances
- 1965; 1969; 1973; 1977; 1981; 1985; 1989; 1993; 1997; 2001; 2005; 2009; 2013; 2017; 2021

Mexico competed in the 2017 Summer Deaflympics which was held in Samsun, Turkey. Mexico sent a delegation consisting of 8 participants for the event. This was only the 4th occasion where Mexico participated at the Summer Deaflympics after making its Deaflympic debut in 2001.

Mexican judoka Maria Huitron clinched the only medal for Mexico at the Deaflympic event after securing the nation's first ever gold medal in the Deaflympic history at the women's Judo event.

== Medalists ==
Name	Medal	Sport	Event
Maria Huitron	Gold	Judo	Women's Judo – 48 kg

== Medal table ==
Sport	Gold	Silver	Bronze	Total
Judo	1	0	0	1
