= Yörükler, 19 Mayıs =

- Interactive map of Yörükler, 19 Mayıs
- Coordinates: 41°31′25″N 36°05′11″E
- Country: Turkey
- Time zone: UTC+3 (TRT)

Yörükler is a neighbourhood in the district of 19 Mayıs, Samsun Province in northern Turkey.
