= United States at the 2017 Summer Deaflympics =

- IOC code: USA
- NOC: USA Deaf Sports Federation

in Samsun, Turkey
- Competitors: 58
- Medals Ranked 10th: Gold 5 Silver 3 Bronze 8 Total 16

Summer Deaflympics appearances (overview)
- 1935; 1939; 1949; 1953; 1957; 1961; 1965; 1969; 1973; 1977; 1981; 1985; 1989; 1993; 1997; 2001; 2005; 2009; 2013; 2017; 2021

The United States competed in the 2017 Summer Deaflympics that was held in Samsun, Turkey. They sent a delegation consisting of 58 participants for the event.

== Participants ==
The United States sent the following number of participants per sport to the 2017 Summer Deaflympics.

Sport	Men	Women	Total
Volleyball	0	11	11

== Medal table ==
Sport	Gold	Silver	Bronze	Total
Athletics	1	1	4	6
Golf	1	0	0	1
Swimming	3	2	3	8
Volleyball	0	0	1	1
