= Melanie Stabel =

German sport shooter (born 1999)

Personal information
- Nationality: German
- Born: September 30, 1999 (age 26)

Sport
- Country: Germany
- Sport: Shooting
Medal record
Women's Shooting
Representing Germany
Event / 1st / 2nd / 3rd; Deaflympics / 1 / 2 / 0
Deaflympics
Gold medal – first place	Samsun 2017	10m air rifle
Silver medal – second place	Samsun 2017	50m rifle 3
Silver medal – second place	Samsun 2017	50m rifle prone

Melanie Stabel (born 30 September 1999) is a German deaf sport shooter. She represented Germany at the 2017 Summer Deaflympics and claimed 3 medals including a gold medal in the women's 10m air rifle with a record score of 412.6 in the finals.

She broke the deaf world record in the women’s 10 m air rifle at the 2017 Summer Deaflympics at age 17, in her first appearance at an international multi-sport event. Melanie also claimed 2 silver medals in the women's 50m air rifle and 50m air rifle prone events. She also broke the deaf world record for women in the 50m rifle prone category with a record score of 615.3 during the qualifiers as a part of the 2017 Summer Deaflympics.
