= Hellenic Athletic Federation of the Deaf =

Greek sport governing body

- Sport: Deaflympics
- Jurisdiction: Greece
- Abbreviation: HAFD
- Founded: 1988
- Affiliation: CISS
- Headquarters: Piraeus
- Location: Neo Faliro, Piraeus
- President: Iosif Stavrakakis
- Secretary: Ioannis Stoufis

Official website
- hafdeaf.gr
- (Greece)

Hellenic Athletic Federation of the Deaf (Greek: Ελληνική Ομοσπονδία Αθλητισμού Κωφών) is the official national sport governing body of Deaf Sports in Greece.

The Hellenic Athletic Federation of the Deaf was formed in 1988. It is affiliated with the Comité International des Sports des Sourds (CISS) and European Deaf Sports Organization.

The Federation is responsible for sending, funding, supporting Deaf sportspeople representing Greece at the Deaflympics and in other Deaf Championships. The Deaf Sport Federation continues to send the deaf sportspeople from Greece to participate at the Deaflympics since 1957.
