= Hasan Doğan Sports Hall =

Indoor sport venue in Canik, Turkey

- Hasan Doğan Spor Salonu
- Location of the sports hall in Turkey.
- Location: Canik, Samsun, Turkey
- Coordinates: 41°15′46″N 36°20′59″E

Tenant
- 2017 Summer Deaflympics

Hasan Doğan Sports Hall (Turkish: Hasan Doğan Spor Salonu) is a multi-purpose indoor sport venue located in Canik district of Samsun Province, northern Turkey. It was named in honor of Hasan Doğan (1956–2008), who served as the president of the Turkish Football Federation.

The sports hall hosts basketball and volleyball competitions. It is the home ground of the women's basketball team of Canik belediyespor.

== International events hosted ==
The venue will host volleyball events of the 2017 Summer Deaflympics.
