= Dereköy, 19 Mayıs =

- Interactive map of Dereköy, 19 Mayıs
- Coordinates: 41°28′33″N 36°07′09″E
- Country: Turkey
- Time zone: UTC+3 (TRT)

Dereköy is a neighbourhood in the district of 19 Mayıs, Samsun Province in northern Turkey. There is a small fishing port.
