= Yaşar Doğu Sports Hall =

Indoor sporting arena located in Turkey

- Yaşar Doğu Spor Salonu
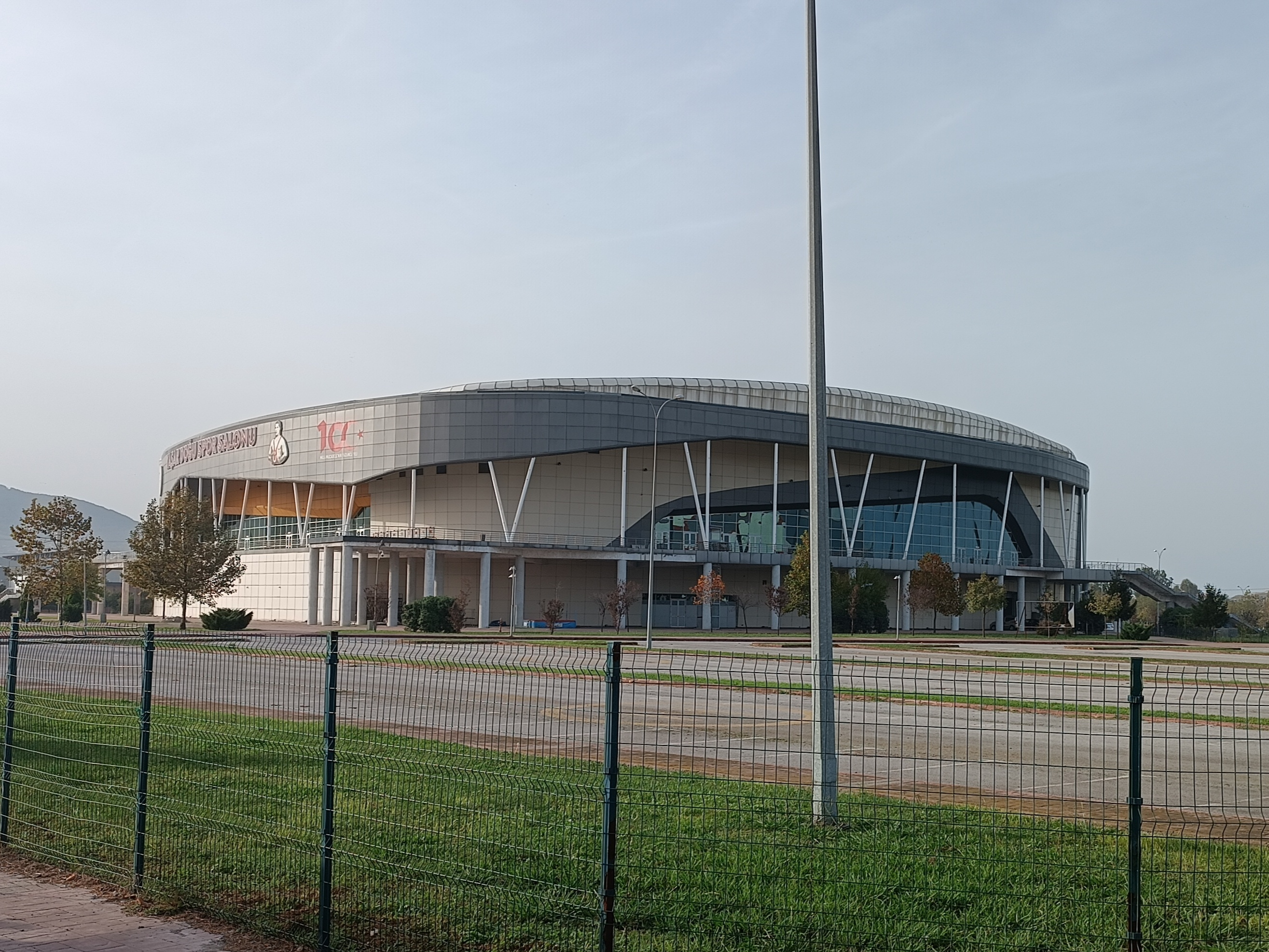
- Interactive map of Yaşar Doğu Sports Hall
- Location: Tekkeköy, Samsun Province, Turkey
- Coordinates: 41°13′35″N 36°27′11″E
- Capacity: 7,500 + 360 moving grandstand + 600 press
- Executive suites: 7
- Field size: 120 m × 110 m (390 ft × 360 ft)
- Acreage: 8,500 m^{2} (91,000 sq ft)

Construction
- Groundbreaking: July 2011
- Opened: March 2013; 13 years ago
- Cost: ₺35 million (approx. US$19.5 million)
- Project manager: Hayrettin Eyüboğlu
- Structural engineer: S. Berk Eyüboğlu
- Main contractor: eyb İnşaat Tic.ve San. Ltd. Şti.

Tenants
- Judo Grand Prix 2013 Samsun; 2013 FIBA Europe Under-20 Championship for Women; WTF World Taekwondo Grand Prix 2015; WTF World Para-Taekwondo Championships 2015; 2016 Judo Grand Prix Samsun; 2017 Summer Deaflympics; 2021 IBSA Goalball European Championships A

Yaşar Doğu Sports Hall (Turkish: Yaşar Doğu Spor Salonu) is a multi-purpose indoor arena located in the Tekkeköy district of Samsun Province, Turkey. Named in honor of renowned Turkish sport wrestler Yaşar Doğu (1913–1961), the sports hall was opened end March 2013.

== History ==
The arena is situated at Sanayi Mah. in Tekkeköy. The construction began in July 2011 and cost ₺35 million (approx. US$19.5 million), of which 80% was financed by Youth and Sports General Directoriate in Ankara and the remaining 20% by Samsun Metropolitan Municipality. The building covers an area of 8,500 m^{2} (91,000 sq ft) within a ground of 50,000 m^{2} (540,000 sq ft). It has a total seating capacity consisting of 7,500 for spectators, 500 at moving grandstand and 300 for press. The complex houses also four big training halls, two squash halls, six big locker rooms, administrative, medical and social facilities.

The arena's first event hosted was an international Judo tournament organized by the International Judo Federation (IJF). In April and May 2013, music concerts for young people and a music festival will take place at the venue. An international amateur boxing tournament was scheduled to be realized in June 2013. It will host on July 4–14 2013 FIBA Europe Under-20 Championship for Women Division A events.

Minister of Youth and Sports Suat Kılıç stated that the 1966-built sports hall with the same name in downtown Samsun having 1,700 seating capacity will be abandoned soon.

== International events hosted ==
2012

- Artistic Billiards World Championship,

2013

- Judo Grand Prix 2013 Samsun, March 30–31,
- FIBA Europe Under-20 Championship for Women 2013 Samsun, July 4–14,

2015

- WTF World Taekwondo Grand Prix 2015 Samsun, September 18–20,
- WTF World Para-Taekwondo Championships 2015 Samsun, September 15–17,

2016

- 2016 Judo Grand Prix Samsun, April 1–04

2017

- The venue hosted basketball events of the 2017 Summer Deaflympics along with Bahattin Ekinci Sports Hall located in the same city.

2021

- The 2021 IBSA Goalball European Championships A were played between 1-13 November.

== See also ==
- List of indoor arenas in Turkey
