= Çarşamba Sports Hall =

Indoor sport venue in Çarşamba, Samsun, Turkey

- Çarşamba Kapalı Spor Salonu
- Location of the sports hall in Turkey.
- Address: Çarşamba Sugar Refinery, Beyyenice, Çarşamba
- Location: Çarşamba, Samsun, Turkey'
- Coordinates: 41°10′29″N 36°42′37″E
- Capacity: 2,000

Tenant
- 2017 Summer Deaflympics

Çarşamba Sports Hall (Turkish: Çarşamba Kapalı Spor Salonu) is a multi-purpose indoor sport venue located in Çarşamba district of Samsun Province, northern Turkey.

The venue is situated at Çarşamba Sugar Refinery, Beyyenice, Çarşamba. It has a seating capacity for 2,000 spectators, including 100 for VIP, 100 for media members, 100 for accredited sportspeople and 80 for physically handicapped people.

== International events hosted ==
The venue will host handball events of the 2017 Summer Deaflympics.
