= Çarşamba Yeşilırmak Stadium =

Football stadium in Çarşamba, Samsun, Turkey

- Çarşamba Yeşilırmak Stadyumu
- Location of the stadium in Turkey.
- Address: Çarşamba Sugar Refinery, Beyyenice, Çarşamba
- Location: Çarşamba, Samsun, Turkey
- Coordinates: 41°10′29″N 36°42′37″E
- Capacity: 5,000

Construction
- Opened: March 7, 2013; 13 years ago

Tenant
- 2017 Summer Deaflympics

Çarşamba Yeşilırmak Stadium, also known as the New City Stadium of Çarşamba, (Turkish: Çarşamba Yeşilırmak Stadyumu or Çarşamba Yeni Şehir Stadyumu) is a football stadium located in Çarşamba district of Samsun Province, northern Turkey. It was named after the Yeşilırmak River, which flows east of the venue. It is the home ground of the local football team Çarşambaspor, who play in the Regional Amateur Leahue.

The stadium is situated at Çarşamba Sugar Refinery, Beyyenice, Çarşamba. It was built by the Municipality of Çarşamba on a land of 40 daa (9.9 acres) in exchange for the real estate of the 1952-built and demolished old city stadium. Its opening took place on March 7, 2013 although not fully completed. It has a nine-lane track for athletics competitions. The stadium's seating capacity is 5,000.

== International events hosted ==
The venue will host football events of the 2017 Summer Deaflympics.
