= Bafra Shooting Range =

Shooting range in Bafra, Samsun, Turkey

- Bafra Atış Poligonu
- Location of the shooting range in Turkey.
- Full name: Şehit Mustafa Serin Atış Poligonu
- Address: Fatih Mah., Sedde Yolu 2. Sok.
- Location: Bafra, Samsun, Turkey
- Coordinates: 41°34′39″N 35°53′43″E
- Capacity: 500

Construction
- Opened: June 2017; 9 years ago

Tenant
- 2017 Summer Deaflympics

Bafra Shooting Range, also known as Şehit Mustafa Serin Shooting Range, (Turkish: Bafra Atış Poligonu or Şehit Mustafa Serin Atış Poligonu) is an indoor shooting range located in Bafra district of Samsun Province, northern Turkey. It was built for the 2017 Summer Deaflympics.

The tender for the construction of the building was announced on November 16, 2016. Built by the local agency of the Ministry of Youth and Sports, it is situated in Fatih Mah., Sedde Yolu 2. Sok. in Bafra. The venue is a two-story building with a 25 m (82 ft) and a 50 m (160 ft) firing range at each floor. It was opened in June 2017, and named in honor of Mustafa Serin, an officer of the Police Special Operation Department in Ankara, who was killed in the line of duty, (Turkish: Şehit for martyr) during the 2016 Turkish coup d'état attempt. The shooting venue has a seating capacity for 500 spectators.

== International events hosted ==
The venue hosted the shooting events of the 2017 Summer Deaflympics.
