= Kavak Sports Hall =

Sports center in Turkey

- Kavak Spor Salonu
- Location of the sports hall in Turkey.
- Address: Yeni Cami Mah., OSB Sok. 7, Kavak
- Location: Kavak, Samsun, Turkey
- Coordinates: 41°05′02″N 36°02′36″E
- Capacity: 578

Construction
- Groundbreaking: 2014
- Opened: 2015; 11 years ago

Tenant
- 2017 Summer Deaflympics

Kavak Sports Hall (Turkish: Kavak Spor Salonu) is a multi-purpose indoor sport venue located in Kavak district of Samsun Province, northern Turkey.

The sports hall is situated in Yeni Cami Mah., OSB Sok. 7 in Kavak. The sports hall was built between 2014 and 2015. It covers an area of 2,200 m^{2} (24,000 sq ft) on a land of 5,300 m^{2} (57,000 sq ft). It hosts basketball, handball and volleyball competitions, as well as archery, karate, and wrestling events. The venue has a seating capacity for 578 spectators.

== International events hosted ==
The venue will host freestyle and Greco-Roman style wrestling events of the 2017 Summer Deaflympics.
