= Orienteering at the 2017 Summer Deaflympics =

Deaflympics event

Orienteering at the 2017 Summer Deaflympics in Samsun, Turkey, took place at five venues: Tekkekoy, City center, Bayraktepe, Kocadag, Kabadüz and Yenikoy.

== Medal summary ==
* Host nation (Turkey)

Rank	NOC	Gold	Silver	Bronze	Total
1	Russia (RUS)	6	4	2	12
2	Ukraine (UKR)	3	4	3	10
3	Lithuania (LTU)	0	1	3	4
4	Italy (ITA)	0	0	1	1
Totals (4 entries)		9	9	9	27

== Medalists ==
=== Men's events ===
Event	Gold	Silver	Bronze
Men Long Distance	Viktor Dinges; Russia	Tomas Kuzminskis; Lithuania	Dmytro Plakhotnik; Russia
Men Middle Distance	Pavel Novikov; Russia	Vladimir Grinin; Russia	Oleksandr Sankin; Ukraine
Men Sprint Distance	Nikita Smirnov; Russia	Nver Surenian; Ukraine	Luigi Lerose; Italy
Men Relay	Russia (RUS); Viktor Dinges; Vladimir Grinin; Pavel Novikov	Ukraine (UKR); Ruslan Nikolayenko; Dmytro Plakhonik; Oleksandr Sankin	Lithuania (LTU); Gedvile Dirziute; Tomas Kuzminskis; Mantas Volungevicius

=== Women's events ===
Event	Gold	Silver	Bronze
Women Long Distance	Iana Melnyk; Ukraine	Antonina Naidionova; Russia	Hanna Fedosieieva; Ukraine
Women Middle Distance	Hanna Fedosieieva; Ukraine	Antonina Naidionova; Russia	Marina Rosink; Russia
Women Sprint Distance	Mariia Makarova; Russia	Hanna Fedosieieva; Ukraine	Antonina Naidionova; Russia
Women Relay	Russia (RUS); Mariia Makarova; Antonina Naidionova; Marina Rosink	Ukraine (UKR); Tetiana Bida; Hanna Fedosieieva; Iana Melnyk	Lithuania (LTU); Adrija Atgalaine; Sandra Lukosiene; Judita Volungeviciene

=== Mixed events ===
Event	Gold	Silver	Bronze
Mixed Relay	Ukraine (UKR); Hanna Fedosieieva; Iana Melnyk; Dmytro Plakhonik; Oleksandr Sankin	Russia (RUS); Viktor Dinges; Mariia Makarova; Antonina Naidionova; Nikita Smirnov	Lithuania (LTU); Adrija Atgalaine; Gedvile Dirziute; Tomas Kuzminskis; Mantas Volungevicius
