= Greece at the Deaflympics =

- IPC code: GRE
- NPC: Hellenic Athletic Federation of the Deaf
- Website: www.hafdeaf.gr
- Medals: Gold 7 Silver 11 Bronze 13 Total 31

Summer appearances
- 1957; 1961; 1965; 1969; 1973; 1977; 1981; 1985; 1989; 1993; 1997; 2001; 2005; 2009; 2013; 2017; 2021

Greece, the birthplace of the Olympic Games competed at the Deaflympics for the first time in 1957. Greece won its first Deaflympics medal in 1993. Greece has never competed at the Winter Deaflympics.

== Participation ==
Games	Men	Women	Total Athletes
Milan 1957	1	0	1
Washington DC 1965	17	0	17
Belgrade 1969	28	0	28
Cologne 1981	4	0	4
Sofia 1993	36	0	36
Copenhagen 1997	34	2	36
Rome 2001	47	19	66
Melbourne 2005	46	18	64
Taipei 2009	26	23	49
Sofia 2013	58	38	96
Samsun 2017	31	23	54
Caxias do Sul 2021-22	43	16	59

== Medal tallies ==
=== Summer Deaflympics ===
Event	Gold	Silver	Bronze	Total
1957	0	0	0	0
1965	0	0	0	0
1969	0	0	0	0
1981	0	0	0	0
1993	1	0	0	1
1997	1	3	2	6
2001	1	2	0	3
2005	1	0	0	1
2009	0	2	3	5
2013	0	1	0	1
2017	2	1	2	5
2021	1	2	6	9

== See also ==
- Greece at the Paralympics
- Greece at the Olympics
