= Athletics at the 2017 Summer Deaflympics =

Deaflympics event

- Location: Turkey, Samsun

Athletics at the 2017 Summer Deaflympics was held at the İlkadım Athletics Stadium.

== Medal summary ==
* Host nation (Turkey)

| Rank | NOC | Gold | Silver | Bronze | Total |
|---|---|---|---|---|---|
| 1 | Russia (RUS) | 21 | 8 | 14 | 43 |
| 2 | Kenya (KEN) | 5 | 5 | 6 | 16 |
| 3 | Japan (JPN) | 2 | 2 | 2 | 6 |
| 4 | Cuba (CUB) | 2 | 1 | 0 | 3 |
| 5 | China (CHN) | 2 | 0 | 2 | 4 |
| 6 | Ukraine (UKR) | 1 | 11 | 4 | 16 |
| 7 | Belarus (BLR) | 1 | 6 | 3 | 10 |
| 8 | United States (USA) | 1 | 1 | 4 | 6 |
| 9 | Germany (GER) | 1 | 1 | 1 | 3 |
| 9 | Turkey (TUR)* | 1 | 1 | 1 | 3 |
| 11 | Iran (IRI) | 1 | 1 | 0 | 2 |
| 12 | Croatia (CRO) | 1 | 0 | 0 | 1 |
| 12 | Czech Republic (CZE) | 1 | 0 | 0 | 1 |
| 12 | Latvia (LAT) | 1 | 0 | 0 | 1 |
| 12 | Norway (NOR) | 1 | 0 | 0 | 1 |
| 12 | Slovakia (SVK) | 1 | 0 | 0 | 1 |
| 17 | Chinese Taipei (TPE) | 0 | 2 | 1 | 3 |
| 17 | Lithuania (LTU) | 0 | 2 | 1 | 3 |
| 19 | South Korea (KOR) | 0 | 1 | 1 | 2 |
| 20 | Sweden (SWE) | 0 | 1 | 0 | 1 |
| 21 | Estonia (EST) | 0 | 0 | 1 | 1 |
| 21 | Spain (ESP) | 0 | 0 | 1 | 1 |
| 21 | Venezuela (VEN) | 0 | 0 | 1 | 1 |
| Totals (23 entries) | | 43 | 43 | 43 | 129 |

== Medalists ==
* Indicates the athlete only competed in the preliminary heats and received medals.

=== Men ===
| Event | Gold | Silver | Bronze |
|---|---|---|---|
| Men 100m | Dmytro Vyshynskyi; Ukraine | Hashem Yadegari; Iran | Nicholas Jones; United States |
| Men 200m | Maki Yamada; Japan | Dmytro Vyshynskyi; Ukraine | Taylor Koss; United States |
| Men 400m | Yasin Suzen; Turkey | Maki Yamada; Japan | Dmytro Rudenko; Ukraine |
| Men 800m | Aliaksandr Charniak; Belarus | Lee Mooyong; South Korea | Jaime Martinez Morga; Spain |
| Men 1500m | John Koech; Kenya | Aliaksandr Charniak; Belarus | Symon Cherono; Kenya |
| Men 5000m | Symon Cherono; Kenya | Michael Letting; Kenya | Daniel Kiptum; Kenya |
| Men 10000m | Symon Cherono; Kenya | Daniel Kiptum; Kenya | Peter Toroitich Wareng; Kenya |
| Men 110 Hurdles | Alan Tyshenko; Russia | Vladislav Knyazev; Russia | Maxim Kulikov; Russia |
| Men 400 Hurdles | Alan Tyshenko; Russia | Konstantin Grebenshchikov; Russia | Taylor Koss; United States |
| Men 3000m Steeplechase | Lucas Wanjiru; Kenya | Chu Chun-Che; Chinese Taipei | Jacob Kipkemoi; Kenya |
| Men 4x100 Relay | Japan (JPN); Hiroki Saegusa; Maki Yamada; Akihisa Shitara; Takuma Sasaki; Kaichi Nakamura* | Ukraine (UKR); Maksym Pendrak; Dmytro Vyshynskyi; Oleksandr Dmytryyenko; Dmytro Rudenko; Volodymyr Danylchenko* | China (CHN); Ma Ruichao; Gao Qingquan; Xu Zhenqing; Li Bin |
| Men 4x400 Relay | Russia (RUS); Artur Abdrakhmanov; Konstanti Grebenshchikov; Victor Oblomkov; Anton Sharapo; Alan Tyshenko*; Andrey Andreev* | Ukraine (UKR); Mykola Kulyk; Serhii Kompaniiets; Sergii Drach; Dmytro Rudenko | Turkey (TUR); Sukru Cetinkaya; Hasan Baydas; Huseyin Baydas; Yasin Suzen |
| Men Marathon | Daniel Kiptum; Kenya | Peter Toroitich Wareng; Kenya | David Muriuki; Kenya |
| Men High Jump | Denis Fedorenkov; Russia | Raman Hralko; Belarus | Konstantin Khilenko; Russia |
| Men Pole Vault | Kirill Fillipov; Russia | Dmitriy Kochkarov; Russia | Chen Chung-Yu; Chinese Taipei |
| Men Long Jump | Maris Grenins; Latvia | Ivan Pakin; Russia | Maxim Kulikov; Russia |
| Men Triple Jump | Ivan Pakin; Russia | Raman Hralko; Belarus | Volodymyr Danylchenko; Ukraine |
| Men Shot Put | Dmitry Kalmykov; Russia | Vytenis Ivaskevicius; Lithuania | Mindaugas Jurksa; Lithuania |
| Men Discus Throw | Sajjad Piraygharchaman; Iran | Masateru Yugami; Japan | Dmitry Kalmykov; Russia |
| Men Hammer Throw | Maxim Bgan; Russia | Muhammed Cakir; Turkey | Takamasa Ishida; Japan |
| Men Javelin Throw | Xin Shun; China | Theodor Thor; Sweden | Jesus Garcia Abreu; Venezuela |
| Men Decathlon | Maxim Kulikov; Russia | Konstantin Khilenko; Russia | Kirill Tsybizov; Russia |

=== Women ===
| Event | Gold | Silver | Bronze |
|---|---|---|---|
| Women 100m | Suslaidy Girat Rivero; Cuba | Rael Wamira; Kenya | Marina Grishina; Russia |
| Women 200m | Ksenia Golovina; Russia | Beryl Wamira; Kenya | Tatsiana Chabatarova; Belarus |
| Women 400m | Asya Khaladzhan; Russia | Alena Tsiarentsyeva; Belarus | Ekaterina Kudriavtseva; Russia |
| Women 800m | Iuliia Abubiakirova; Russia | Diana Solodova; Russia | Ekaterina Kudriavtseva; Russia |
| Women 1500m | Diana Solodova; Russia | Halina Kozich; Belarus | Anastasiia Sydorenko; Ukraine |
| Women 5000m | Diana Solodova; Russia | Anastasiia Sydorenko; Ukraine | Hannah Wakonyo; Kenya |
| Women 10000m | Yang Chunhua; China | Nele Alder-Baerens; Germany | Daria Gaynetdinova; Russia |
| Women 100 Hurdles | Janna Vandermeulen; United States | Yuliia Shapoval; Ukraine | Anastasia Klechkina; Russia |
| Women 400 Hurdles | Asya Khaladzhan; Russia | Viktoriia Kochmaryk; Ukraine | Janna Vandermeulen; United States |
| Women 4x100 Relay | Russia (RUS); Alena Filushkina; Oxana Klimova; Marina Grishina; Ksenia Golovina; Asya Khaladzhan* | Ukraine (UKR); Viktoriia Kochmaryk; Yuliia Shapoval; Solomiia Kuprych; Natalia Iezlovetska | Belarus (BLR); Yana Hancharova; Katsiaryna Zhurbenkova; Darya Sadavaya; Tatsiana Chabatarova; Marharyta Hralko* |
| Women 4x400 Relay | Russia (RUS); Victoria Chernysheva; Iuliia Abubiakirova; Ekaterina Kudriavtseva; Asya Khaladzhan | Ukraine (UKR); Viktoriia Kochmaryk; Yuliia Shapoval; Solomiia Kuprych; Natalia Iezlovetska | Belarus (BLR); Liudmila Krautsova; Halina Kozich; Yana Hancharova; Tatsiana Chabatarova |
| Women Marathon | Nele Alder-Baerens; Germany | Mariia Svynobii; Ukraine | Oh Sang Mi; South Korea |
| Women High Jump | Kristina Karapetyan; Russia | Carly Timpson; United States | Marja-Liisa Landar; Estonia |
| Women Pole Vault | Maria Nechaeva; Russia | Ekaterina Nikiforova; Russia | Kanako Takizawa; Japan |
| Women Long Jump | Marina Grishina; Russia | Suslaidy Girat Rivero; Cuba | Angela Alemseitova; Russia |
| Women Triple Jump | Suslaidy Girat Rivero; Cuba | Marharyta Hralko; Belarus | Angela Alemseitova; Russia |
| Women Shot Put | Ivana Kristoficova; Slovakia | Svetlana Biziakina; Russia | Ren Chunxia; China |
| Women Discus Throw | Lenka Matouskova; Czech Republic | Larisa Voroneckaja; Lithuania | Elizaveta Kashcavtseva; Russia |
| Women Hammer Throw | Trude Raad; Norway | Rymma Filimoshkina; Ukraine | Yuliia Kysylova; Ukraine |
| Women Javellin Throw | Laura Štefanac; Croatia | Hsu An-Yi; Chinese Taipei | Mamlina Anastasia; Russia |
| Women Heptathlon | Anastasia Klechkina; Russia | Kateryna Potapenko; Ukraine | Felicitas Merker; Germany |
