= Greece at the 2017 Summer Deaflympics =

Greece at the 2017 Deaflympics
- IOC code: GRE
- NOC: Greece Deaf Sports Committee
- Website: www.hafdeaf.gr

in Samsun
- Competitors: 54
- Medals Ranked 16th: Gold 2 Silver 1 Bronze 2 Total 5

Summer appearances
- 1957; 1961; 1965; 1969; 1973; 1977; 1981; 1985; 1989; 1993; 1997; 2001; 2005; 2009; 2013; 2017; 2021

Greece competed in the 2017 Summer Deaflympics which was held in Samsun, Turkey. Greece sent a delegation consisting of 54 competitors for the multi-sporting event.

The delegates who represented Greece won a total of 5 medals at the Deaflympic event including 2 gold medals to their medal tally.

== Basketball ==
Greece deaf women's basketball team created history in the basketball competition after beating favourites and European champions Lithuania in the women's basketball final to secure the gold medal with the final score ending up in the favour of Greece, 67–50. This was the first instance where the national women's deaf basketball team was managed to clinch the gold medal in the competition. However, the Greek deaf men's basketball team only managed to secure the 4th place in the men's basketball event.

== Medalists ==
Name	Medal	Sport	Event
Papadatos Alexandros	Gold	Wrestling	Greco-Roman - 130 kg
Greece	Gold	Basketball	Women's basketball
Papadatos Alexandros	Silver	Wrestling	Freestyle - 125 kg
Fouledaki Maria	Bronze	Taekwondo	Women's 67 kg
Liotsos Pavlos	Bronze	Taekwondo	Men's 58 kg

== Medal table ==
Sport	Gold	Silver	Bronze	Total
Wrestling	1	1	0	2
Basketball	1	0	0	1
Taekwondo	0	0	2	2
