= Brazil at the 2017 Summer Deaflympics =

Brazil at the 2017 Deaflympics
- IOC code: BRA
- NOC: Brazil Deaf Sports Federation
- Website: www.cbds.org.br

in Samsun
- Competitors: 101
- Medals Ranked 28th: Gold 1 Silver 0 Bronze 4 Total 5

Summer appearances
- 1993; 1997; 2001; 2005; 2009; 2013; 2017; 2021

Brazil competed in the 2017 Summer Deaflympics which was held in Samsun, Turkey. Brazil sent a delegation consisting of 101 participants for the event. This was the 9th consecutive time that Brazil was eligible to participate at the Summer Deaflympics since making its debut in 1985.

Brazil managed to receive 5 medals in the event including one gold and 4 bronze medals.

== Football ==
Brazil Men's deaf football team competed in the Football tournament as a part of the 2017 Summer Deaflympics in Group D along with Great Britain, Russia and South Korea. The men's national team was eliminated from the group stage after losing all the group matches. The women's national deaf football team managed to secure a bronze medal in the football competition beating Great Britain in the 3rd place playoff.

== Medalists ==
Name	Medal	Sport	Event
Guilherme Maia Kabbach	Gold	Swimming	Men's 200m freestyle
Guilherme Maia Kabbach	Bronze	Swimming	Men's 100m freestyle
Heron Rodrigues Silva	Bronze	Karate	Men's 84kg
Alexandre Soares Fernandes	Bronze	Judo	Men's 90kg
Brazil	Bronze	Football	women's football

== Medal table ==
Sport	Gold	Silver	Bronze	Total
Swimming	1	0	1	2
Karate	0	0	1	1
Judo	0	0	1	1
Football	0	0	1	1
