= 19 Mayıs =

- District and municipality
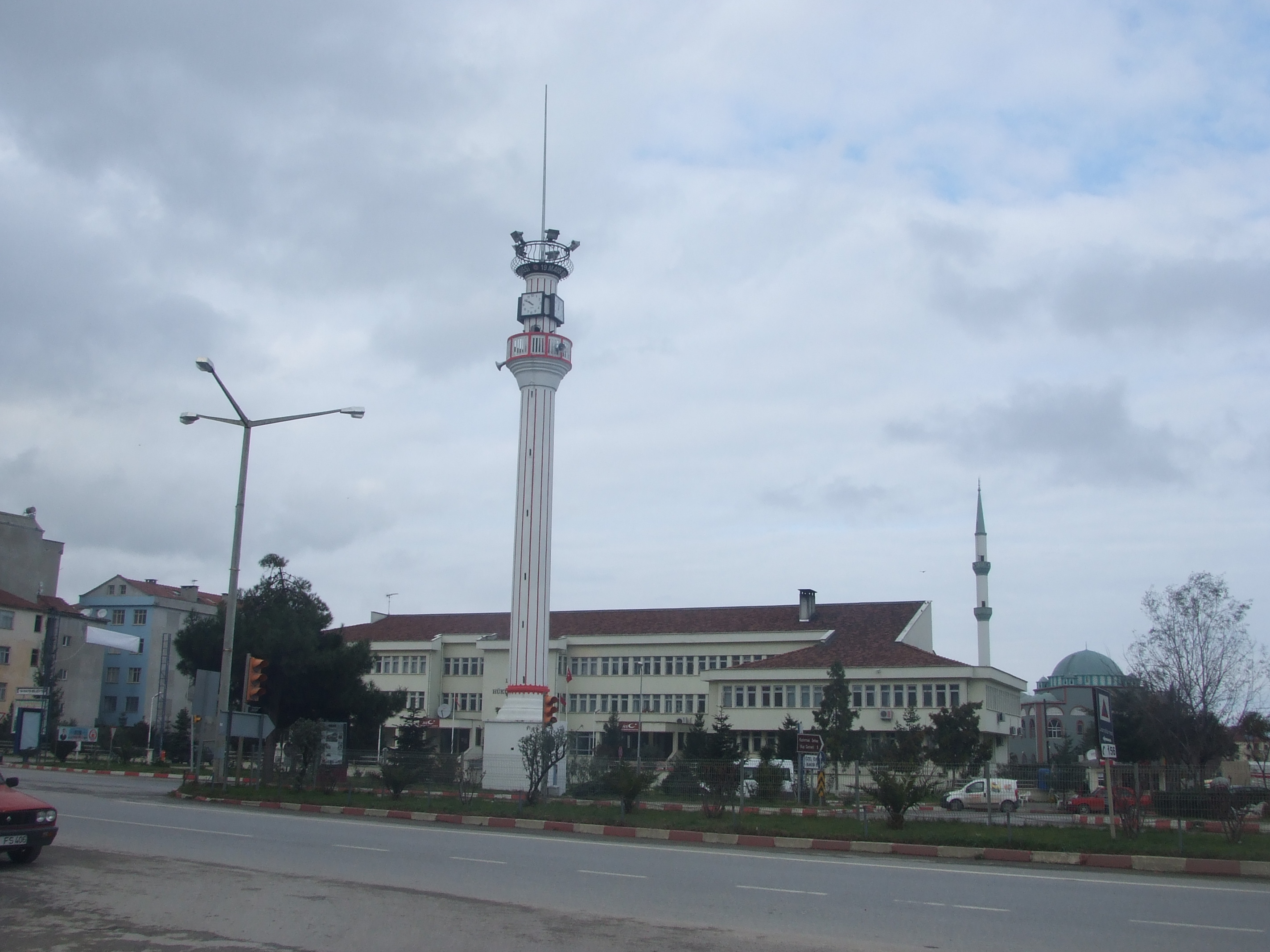
- 19 Mayıs Clock Tower

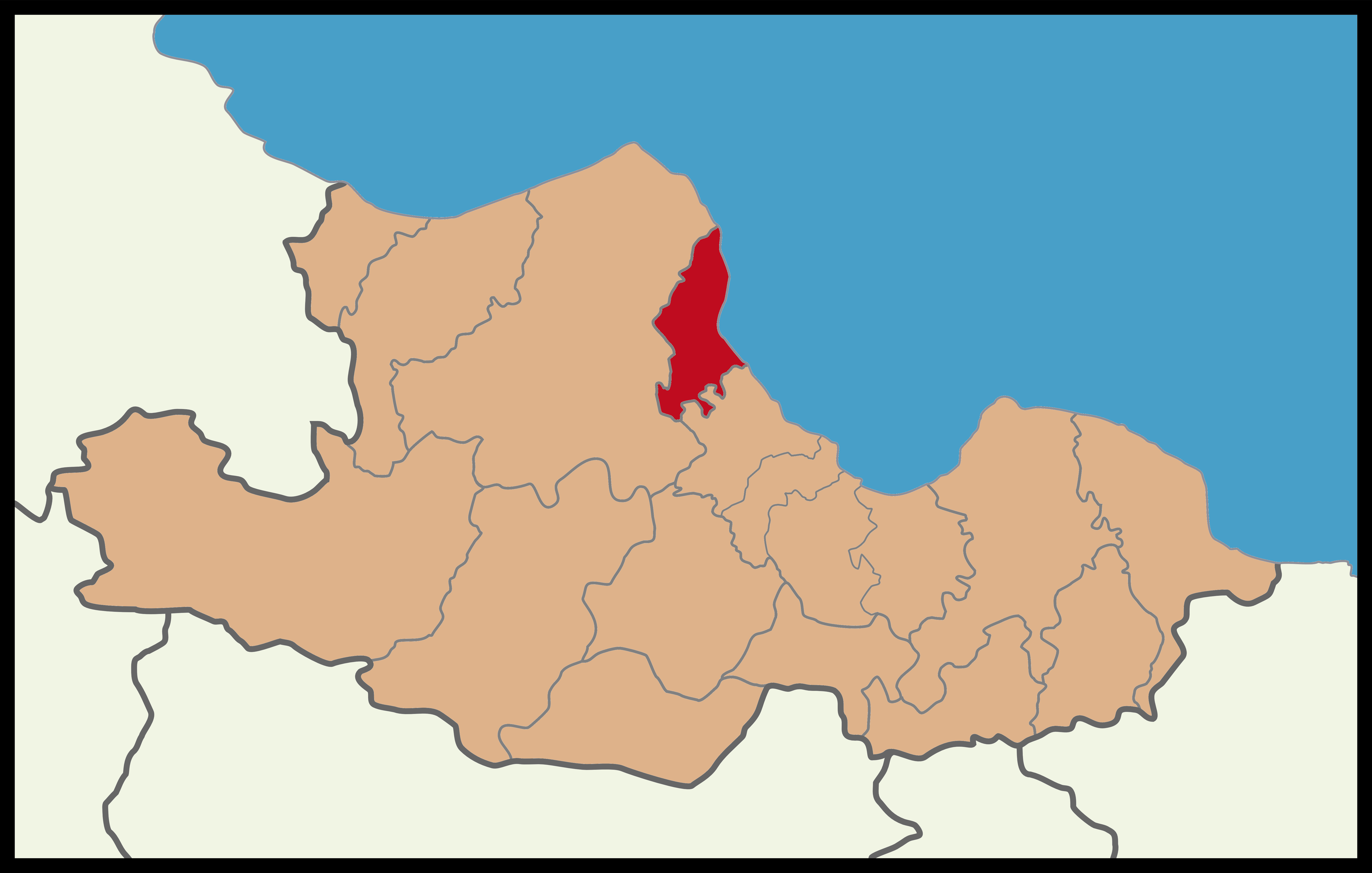
- Map showing 19 Mayıs District in Samsun Province

- Location within Turkey
- Coordinates: 41°29′40″N 36°04′44″E
- Country: Turkey
- Province: Samsun

Government
  - Mayor: Osman Topaloğlu (AKP)
- Area: 234 km^{2} (90 sq mi)
- Population (2022): 26,989
  - Density: 115/km^{2} (299/sq mi)
- Time zone: UTC+3 (TRT)
- Postal code: 55420
- Area code: 0362
- Climate: Cfa
- Website: www.19mayis.bel.tr

19 Mayıs (Ondokuz Mayıs, "19 May") is a municipality and district of Samsun Province, Turkey. Its area is 234 km^{2}, and its population is 26,989 (2022). The mayor is Osman Topaloğlu (AKP).

== Composition ==
There are 38 neighbourhoods in 19 Mayıs District:

- Aydınpınar
- Bahçelievler
- Ballıca
- Beylik
- Çamlıca
- Çandır
- Çebinler
- Cerekli
- Çetirlipınar
- Çiftlik
- Cumhuriyet
- Dağköy
- Dereköy
- Düzköy
- Engiz
- Esentepe
- Esenyer
- Fındıklı
- Hibe
- İstiklal
- Karacaoğlu
- Karagöl
- Karşıyaka
- Kertme
- Kösedik
- Kumcağız
- Kuşkayası
- Mimarsinan
- Ormancık
- Pazar
- Tepeköy
- Yeni
- Yeşilköy
- Yeşilova
- Yeşilyurt
- Yörükler
- Yukarıengiz
- Yükseliş
