= 2017 Summer Deaflympics =

23rd Summer Deaflympics

XXIII Summer Deaflympics
- Host city: Samsun, Turkey
- Motto: Our voice is sport (Turkish: Sesimiz Spor)
- Nations: 86
- Athletes: 2,873
- Events: 219 in 18 sports
- Opening: July 18, 2017
- Closing: July 30, 2017
- Opened by: Recep Tayyip Erdoğan
- Athlete's Oath: Ömer Otamış
- Torch lighter: Ertuğrul Bursa
- Main venue: Samsun 19 Mayıs Stadium

Summer

Winter

The 2017 Summer Deaflympics (Turkish: 2017 Yaz İşitme Engelliler Olimpiyat Oyunları), officially known as the 23rd Summer Deaflympics (Turkish: 23'üncü Yaz İşitme Engelliler Olimpiyat Oyunları), is an international multi-sport event that took place in Samsun, Turkey from July 18 to July 30, 2017. 3,148 athletes from 97 countries competed in 18 sports with 21 disciplines. 86 records were broken with 54 being world records and 32 being Deaflympics records.

== Sports ==
2017 Summer Deaflympics offered 18 Sports including Golf which made its debut.

- Athletics (43)
- Badminton (6)
- Basketball (2)
- Bowling (12)
- Cycling
  - Mountain biking (2)
  - Road (8)
- Football (2)
- Golf (2)
- Handball (1)
- Judo (17)
- Karate (18)
- Orienteering (9)
- Shooting (12)
- Swimming (40)
- Table tennis (7)
- Taekwondo (13)
- Tennis (5)
- Volleyball
  - Indoor volleyball (2)
  - Beach volleyball (2)
- Wrestling
  - Freestyle (8)
  - Greco-Roman (8)

== Venues ==
The largest venue at the games in terms of seating capacity was the 33,919 -seat Samsun 19 Mayıs Stadium, which served as the ceremonies venue.

Venue	Location	Sport
İlkadım Athletics Stadium	İlkadım	Athletics
Bafra Sports Hall	Bafra	Badminton
Bahattin Ekinci Sports Hall	Tekkeköy	Basketball
Yaşar Doğu Sport Hall	Tekkeköy	Basketball, Closing ceremony
İlkadım Beach Volleyball Court	İlkadım	Beach volleyball
Samsun Bowling Hall	İlkadım	Bowling
19 Mayıs District	Ondokuzmayıs	Cycling
Canik 19 Mayıs Stadium	Canik	Football
Samsun 19 Mayıs Stadium	Tekkeköy	Opening ceremony
Çarşamba Stadium	Çarşamba	Football
Bafra Stadium	Bafra	Football
Samsun Golf Course	Atakum	Golf
Çarşamba Sports Hall	Çarşamba	Handball
Atatürk Sports Hall	Canik	Judo
Atatürk Sports Hall	Canik	Karate
Atatürk Sports Hall	Canik	Taekwondo
Mountain Bike Trail	Ondokuz Mayıs University	Mountain bike
Orienteering venues: Tekkekoy, City center, Bayraktepe, Kocadag, Kabadüz, Yenikoy	Samsun	Orienteering
Bafra Shooting Range	Bafra	Shooting
Atakum Olympic Swimming Pool	Atakum	Swimming
Archery Sports Hall	İlkadım	Table tennis
Samsun Tennis Club	Canik	Tennis
Hasan Doğan Sports Hall	Canik	Volleyball
Mustafa Dağıstanlı Sports Hall	İlkadım	Volleyball
Kavak Sports Hall	Kavak	Wrestling

== Participating National Deaf Sports Associations ==
A total of 97 National Deaf Sports Associations from all over the world participated in the Games. This was the highest number of nations in any edition before. Afghanistan, Cameroon, Ivory Coast, Mali made their debut at the games.

Participating National Deaf Sports Associations
- Afghanistan (5)
- Algeria (7)
- Argentina (38)
- Armenia (10)
- Australia (20)
- Austria (8)
- Azerbaijan (5)
- Belarus (43)
- Belgium (5)
- Brazil (101)
- Bulgaria (20)
- Cameroon (4)
- Canada (26)
- Chile (3)
- China (107)
- Ivory Coast (4)
- Colombia (19)
- Croatia (37)
- Cuba (5)
- Cyprus (1)
- Czech Republic (20)
- Denmark (17)
- Ecuador (9)
- Egypt (22)
- Estonia (11)
- Ethiopia (2)
- Finland (9)
- France (45)
- Georgia (13)
- Germany (105)
- Ghana (10)
- Great Britain (62)
- Greece (54)
- Guatemala (1)
- Hong Kong (21)
- Hungary (27)
- India (46)
- Indonesia (7)
- Iran (92)
- Iraq (4)
- Ireland (2)
- Israel (7)
- Italy (73)
- Japan (108)
- Kazakhstan (50)
- Kenya (57)
- South Korea (79)
- Kyrgyzstan (10)
- Latvia (11)
- Libya (6)
- Lithuania (45)
- Malaysia (16)
- Mali (6)
- Malta (1)
- Mauritius (3)
- Mexico (8)
- Moldova (3)
- Mongolia (14)
- Macedonia (4)
- Nepal (3)
- Netherlands (9)
- Norway (7)
- Pakistan (11)
- Poland (98)
- Portugal (11)
- Russia (287)
- Saudi Arabia (25)
- Singapore (5)
- Slovakia (10)
- Slovenia (14)
- South Africa (4)
- Spain (18)
- Sweden (10)
- Switzerland (7)
- Thailand (9)
- Turkey (288) (host)
- Turkmenistan (5)
- Chinese Taipei (61)
- Ukraine (217)
- United Arab Emirates (8)
- United States (58)
- Uzbekistan (9)
- Venezuela (79)
- Yemen (1)
- Zambia (3)

== Logo ==
Cakir, the games' official mascot.

The logo of the games is a combination of the elements of The Olympic Games, the Olympic flame, deaf communication, Samsun Pheasant Bird, Turkish Tulip, Peace and Friendship.

== Mascot ==
The official mascot of the 2017 Summer Deaflympics was unveiled on June 13, 2017. It represents a local male resident wearing regional outfit. The name of the mascot was chosen as "Çakır" (literally "greyish blue") following a voting on the official website of the Deaflympics.

== Torch relay ==
The Deaflympic Torch was brought from Lausanne, Switzerland to Batı Park in Samsun by the Turkish Olympic champion in wrestling, Taha Akgül. The torch relay began with lighting of the torches of the Turkish sportspeople as "Olympic ambassadors", the footballers Gökhan Gönül and Sabri Sarıoğlu, world-record holder female diver Şahika Ercümen and television host Ece Vahapoğlu. Led by the Minister of Youth and Sports Akif Çağatay Kılıç, they marched to the Mustafa Dağıstanlı Sports Hall, where the torch was handed over to the mayor of the Samsun Metropolitan Municipality, Yusuf Ziya Yılmaz.

== Calendar ==
This is currently based on the schedule released by the official website of the Games.

All dates are Turkish Time (UTC+3)

OC	Opening ceremony	●	Event competitions	1	Gold medal events	CC	Closing ceremony

July		18th Tue	19th Wed	20th Thu	21st Fri	22nd Sat	23rd Sun	24th Mon	25th Tue	26th Wed	27th Thu	28th Fri	29th Sat	30th Sun	Events
Ceremonies		OC												CC	—N/a
Athletics							4	8	7	3	5	6	10		43
Badminton			●	●	1		●	●	●	●	●	5			6
Basketball			●	●	●	●	●	●	●	●	●		2		2
Bowling				1	1	1	1	1	1		1	1	4		12
Cycling	Road cycling		2		2		2		2						10
Cycling	Mountain biking							2							10
Football		●	●	●	●	●	●	●	●	●	●	●	●	2	2
Golf					●	●	●	●	●	2					2
Handball				●		●		●		●	●	1			1
Judo				7	8	2									17
Karate								8	6	4					18
Orienteering					2		1		2		2		2		9
Shooting			1	1	1	2	1	1	1	2	1	1			12
Swimming				7	6	7		6	7	7					40
Table tennis				●	2		1	2	●	●	2				7
Taekwondo												5	4	4	13
Tennis			●	●	●	●	●	●	●	●	3	2			5
Volleyball	Beach volleyball			●	●	●	●	●	●	●	●		2		4
Volleyball	Indoor volleyball		●	●	●	●	●		●	●	●	2			4
Wrestling					4	4			4	4					16
Daily medal events			3	16	27	16	10	28	30	22	14	23	24	6	219
Cumulative total			3	19	46	62	72	100	130	152	166	189	213	219	219
July		18th Tue	19th Wed	20th Thu	21st Fri	22nd Sat	23rd Sun	24th Mon	25th Tue	26th Wed	27th Thu	28th Fri	29th Sat	30th Sun	Total events

== Medals ==
This is the table of the medal count of the 2017 Summer Deaflympics, based on the medal count of the International Olympic Committee (IOC). These rankings sort by the number of gold medals, earned by a National Deaf Sports Association (NDSA). The number of silver medals is taken into consideration next and then the number of bronze medals. If, after the above, countries are still tied, equal ranking is given and they are listed alphabetically by IOC Country Code. Although this information is provided by the IOC, the CISS itself does not recognize or endorse any ranking system.

Final medal table:

* Host nation (Turkey)

2017 Summer Deaflympics medal table
Rank	NOC	Gold	Silver	Bronze	Total
1	Russia	85	53	61	199
2	Ukraine	21	42	36	99
3	South Korea	18	20	14	52
4	Turkey (TUR)*	17	7	22	46
5	China	14	9	11	34
6	Japan	6	9	12	27
7	Iran	5	9	20	34
8	Venezuela	5	5	8	18
9	Kenya	5	5	6	16
10	United States	5	3	8	16
11	Belarus	4	9	3	16
12	Chinese Taipei (TPE)	4	5	8	17
13	Germany	4	5	3	12
14	Great Britain	3	1	5	9
15	Slovakia	2	2	2	6
16	Greece (GRE)	2	1	2	5
17	Cuba (CUB)	2	1	0	3
18	Czech Republic	2	0	2	4
19	Thailand	2	0	0	2
20	Lithuania	1	5	7	13
21	Italy	1	3	8	12
22	Poland	1	3	7	11
23	Croatia	1	3	2	6
24	France	1	2	6	9
25	Kazakhstan	1	1	5	7
26	India (IND)	1	1	3	5
27	Switzerland	1	1	0	2
28	Brazil (BRA)	1	0	4	5
29	Norway (NOR)	1	0	1	2
29	Singapore (SGP)	1	0	1	2
31	Latvia	1	0	0	1
31	Mexico (MEX)	1	0	0	1
33	Mongolia	0	4	5	9
34	Georgia	0	2	1	3
35	South Africa (RSA)	0	2	0	2
36	Armenia	0	1	4	5
37	Indonesia	0	1	1	2
37	Portugal	0	1	1	2
39	Ecuador	0	1	0	1
39	Malaysia (MAS)	0	1	0	1
39	Sweden	0	1	0	1
42	Kyrgyzstan	0	0	4	4
43	Bulgaria	0	0	3	3
44	Austria	0	0	1	1
44	Egypt	0	0	1	1
44	Estonia	0	0	1	1
44	Finland	0	0	1	1
44	Hungary (HUN)	0	0	1	1
44	Israel (ISR)	0	0	1	1
44	Netherlands	0	0	1	1
44	Spain (ESP)	0	0	1	1
Totals (51 entries)		219	219	294	732

Preceded by Sofia-Fussen	Summer Deaflympic Games; Samsun; XXIII Summer Deaflympics (2017)	Succeeded by Caxias do Sul 2022
