= Canik =

- District and municipality
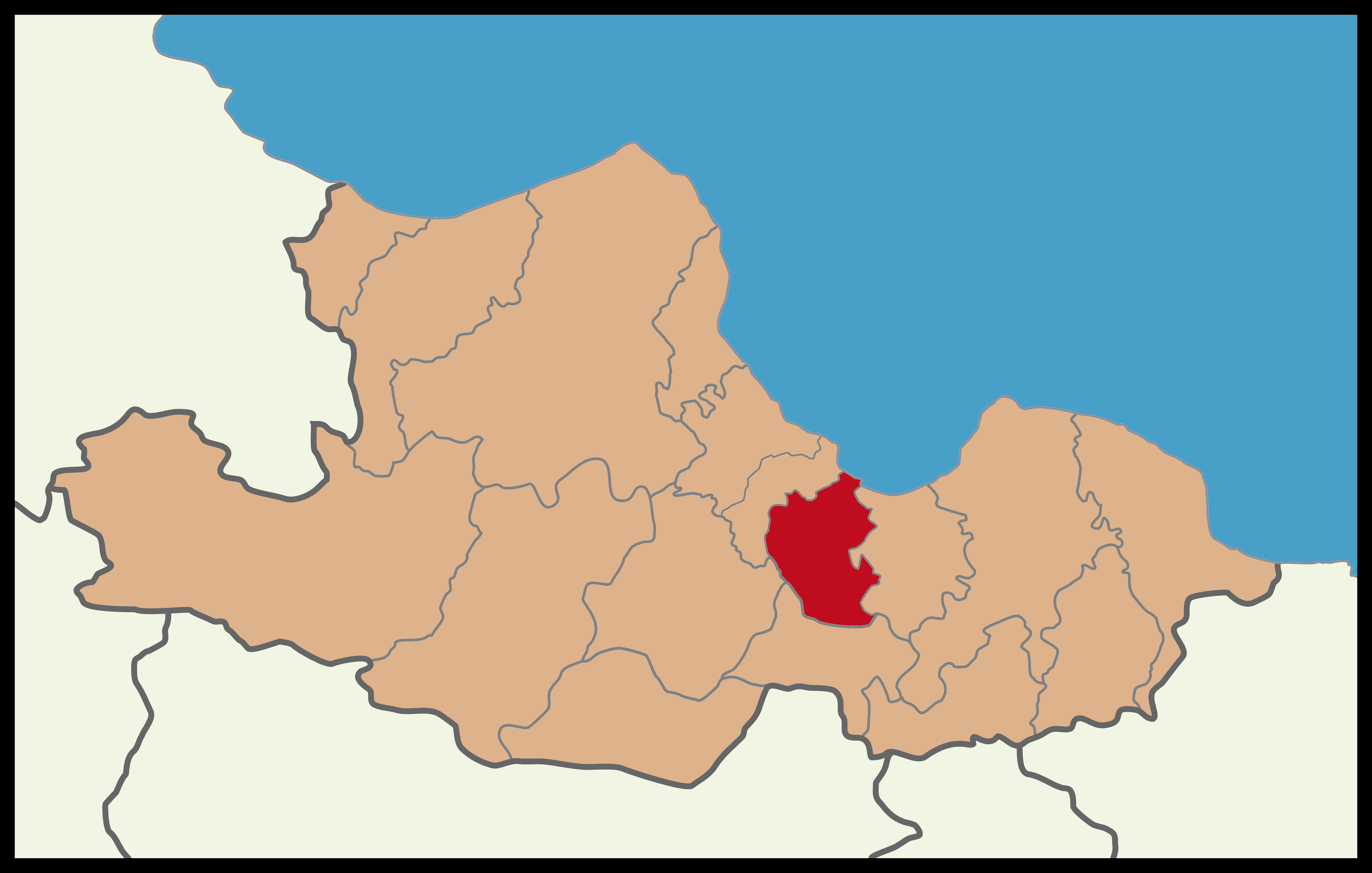
- Map showing Canik District in Samsun Province

- Location within Turkey
- Coordinates: 41°16′19″N 36°21′03″E
- Country: Turkey
- Province: Samsun

Government
  - Mayor: İbrahim Sandıkçı (AKP)
- Area: 264 km^{2} (102 sq mi)
- Population (2022): 100,641
  - Density: 381/km^{2} (987/sq mi)
- Time zone: UTC+3 (TRT)
- Area code: 0362
- Climate: Cfa
- Website: www.canik.bel.tr

Canik is a municipality and district of Samsun Province, Turkey. Its area is 264 km^{2}, and its population is 100,641 (2022). It is located to the east of the city center of Samsun.

Canik means land of Tzan/Can Laz people and became one of the four town municipalities under the patronage of Samsun Metropolitan Municipality in 1994. The region was largely settled by middle and lower working-class people in those days, but recent years made a big impact in the local economy. In 2008 the district Canik was created from part of the former central district of Samsun, along with İlkadım and Atakum. At the 2013 Turkish local government reorganisation, the rural part of the district was integrated into the municipality, the villages becoming neighbourhoods.

== Geography ==
It is located on the north, Black Sea coast of Turkey.

== Composition ==
There are 52 neighbourhoods in Canik District:

- 200 Evler
- Adatepe
- Alibeyli
- Ambarpınar
- Atatürk
- Avluca
- Başalan
- Başkonak
- Belediye Evleri
- Çağlayan
- Çamalan
- Demirci
- Dereler
- Devgeriş
- Düvecik
- Düzardıç
- Düzeren
- Gaziosmanpaşa
- Gecehan
- Gödekli
- Gökçepınar
- Gölalan
- Gültepe
- Gürgenyatak
- Hacı Ismail
- Hacınaipli
- Hasköy
- Hilaltepe
- İmamlar
- Kaleboğazı
- Karşıyaka
- Kaşyayla
- Kestanepınar
- Kızıloğlak
- Kozlu
- Kuzey Yıldızı
- Muratlı
- Sarıbıyık
- Soğuksu
- Tekkiraz
- Teknepınar
- Toptepe
- Toygar
- Tuzaklı
- Üçpınar
- Uluçayır
- Uludağ
- Yavuzselim
- Yayla
- Yeniköy
- Yenimahalle
- Yeşilpınar
