= Malaysia at the Deaflympics =

- IOC code: MAS
- NOC: Malaysian Deaf Sports Association
- Website: www.msdeaf.org.my
- Medals Ranked 51st: Gold 4 Silver 13 Bronze 5 Total 22

Summer appearances
- 1993; 1997; 2001; 2005; 2009; 2013; 2017; 2021

Malaysia first competed at the Deaflympics for the first time in 1993. Since then, Malaysia has competed at the Summer Deaflympics on four occasions (2001, 2005, 2009 & 2017). Malaysia won its first Deaflympic medal also during its maiden appearance at the 1993 Summer Deaflympics. Malaysia also narrowly missed the opportunity to compete at the 2013 Summer Deaflympics after being not readied to take part at the event.

Prior to the 2017 Summer Deaflympics, Malaysian government announced that the medallists at the Summer Deaflympics would be rewarded.

Malaysia have never competed at the Winter Deaflympics.

== Medal tallies ==
=== Summer Deaflympics ===
Games	Athletes	Gold	Silver	Bronze	Total	Rank
(Bulgaria) Sofia 1993	5	0	2	0	2	25
(Denmark) Copenhagen 1997	Did not participate					
(Italy) Rome 2001	33	1	3	0	4	22
(Australia) Melbourne 2005	15	0	0	2	2	38
Taipei 2009	4	0	1	1	2	39
(Bulgaria) Sofia 2013	Did not participate					
(Turkey) Samsun 2017	16	0	1	0	1	39
(Brazil) Caxias do Sul 2021	23	2	4	1	7	27
(Japan) Tokyo 2025	23	1	2	1	4	
Total		4	13	5	22	51

=== Medals by Summer Sport ===
Sport	Gold	Silver	Bronze	Total
Bowling	2	3	1	6
Badminton	1	8	2	11
Athletics	1	0	1	2
Karate	0	2	0	2
Swimming	0	0	1	1
Totals (5 entries)	4	13	5	22

== List of medalist ==
=== Summer Deaflympics ===
Medal	Name	Games	Sport	Event
Silver	Teh Cheang Hock	(Bulgaria) Sofia 1993	Badminton	Men's singles
Silver	Teh Cheang Hock; Tan Seok Kean	(Bulgaria) Sofia 1993	Badminton	Mixed doubles
Gold	Zana Azizul Ujang	(Italy) Rome 2001	Athletics	Men's 110m hurdles
Silver	Teh Cheang Hock; Mar Meng Wan	(Italy) Rome 2001	Badminton	Men's doubles
Silver	Teh Cheang Hock	(Italy) Rome 2001	Badminton	Men's singles
Silver	Teh Cheang Hock; Mar Meng Wan; Wu Wai Loon; Yeo Kok Fang; Artika Suraya Ayub; Foo Chiew Phing	(Italy) Rome 2001	Badminton	Team
Bronze	Zana Azizul Ujang	(Australia) Melbourne 2005	Athletics	Men's 110m hurdles
Bronze	Jimmy Wong Tee Meng	(Australia) Melbourne 2005	Swimming	Men's 400m individual medley
Silver	Teh Cheang Hock; Yeo Kok Fang	Taipei 2009	Badminton	Men's doubles
Bronze	Mohd Zaidi Awang	Taipei 2009	Bowling	Men's singles
Silver	Boon Wei Ying; Francis Tan Heng Bock	(Turkey) Samsun 2017	Badminton	Mixed doubles
Gold	Boon Wei Ying; Foo Zu Tung	(Brazil) Caxias do Sul 2021	Badminton	Women's doubles
Gold	Hong Siong Mui; Huwainaa Danduan Abdullah; Zuriana Roslan; Peng Kam Cheng; Hie Siw Sing; Nor Misha Nathera	(Brazil) Caxias do Sul 2021	Bowling	Women's team
Silver	Edmund Teo Seng Keong; Boon Wei Ying	(Brazil) Caxias do Sul 2021	Badminton	Mixed doubles
Silver	Yilamaran Vispalinggam	(Brazil) Caxias do Sul 2021	Karate	Men's Kumite -84kg
Silver	Mohammad Syahmi Abdul Hamid; Mohd Zaidi Awang; Choon Seng Ho; Edmondson Kok Leng; Mohd Firdaus Mohamad; Chew Hoong Wong	(Brazil) Caxias do Sul 2021	Bowling	Men's team
Silver	Mohammad Syahmi Abdul Hamid; Mohd Zaidi Awang; Mohd Firdaus Mohamad	(Brazil) Caxias do Sul 2021	Bowling	Men's trio
Bronze	Boon Wei Ying	(Brazil) Caxias do Sul 2021	Badminton	Women's singles
Gold	Syabil Azam Syamsul Azam; Ho Choon Seong	(Japan) Tokyo 2025	Bowling	Men's doubles
Silver	Huwainaa Danduan Abdullah; Misha Nathera Mackery	(Japan) Tokyo 2025	Bowling	Women's doubles
Silver	Yilamaran Vispalinggam	(Japan) Tokyo 2025	Karate	Men's kumite 84 kg
Bronze	Edmund Teo Seng Keong; Boon Wei Ying	(Japan) Tokyo 2025	Badminton	Mixed doubles

== See also ==
- Malaysia at the Paralympics
