= Malaysia at the 2025 Summer Deaflympics =

- IOC code: MAS
- National federation: Malaysian Deaf Sports Association
- Website: www.msdeaf.org.my

in Tokyo, Japan 15 – 26 November 2025
- Competitors: 23 (16 men and 7 women) in 4 sports
- Flag bearer: Foo Zu Tung
- Medals: Gold 1 Silver 2 Bronze 1 Total 4

Summer Deaflympics appearances (overview)
- 1993; 1997; 2001; 2005; 2009; 2013; 2017; 2021

Malaysia competed at the 2025 Summer Deaflympics which was held from 15 to 26 November 2025 in Tokyo, Japan.

== Competitors ==
Sport	Men	Women	Total
Athletics	6	1	7
Badminton	3	3	6
Bowling	3	3	6
Karate	4	0	4
Total	16	7	23

== Medalists ==
Medal	Name	Sport	Event	Date
Gold	Syabil Azam Syamsul Azam; Ho Choon Seong	Bowling	Men's doubles	21 November
Silver	Huwainaa Danduan Abdullah; Misha Nathera Mackery	Bowling	Women's doubles	22 November
Silver	Yilamaran Vispalinggam	Karate	Men's kumite 84 kg	24 November
Bronze	Edmund Teo Seng Keong; Boon Wei Ying	Badminton	Mixed doubles	21 November
