= Fikriye Hülür =

Turkish volleyball player (born 2000)

Personal information
- Nationality: Turkish
- Born: 2000 (age 25–26); Gölköy, Ordu, Turkey
Honours
Representing Turkey
Women's volleyball
Deaflympics
Silver medal – second place	2025 Tokyo	Team
Gold medal – first place	2021 Caxias do Sul	Team
World Championships
Gold medal – first place	2021 Chianciano Terme	Team
European Championships
Silver medal – second place	2023 Karabük	Team

Fikriye Hülür (born 2000) is a Turkish female deaf volleyball player.

== Sport career ==
Hülür is a member of the Turkey women's national deaf volleyball team. She competed at the Summer Deaflympics. At the 2017 Samsun Deaflympics in Turkey, she placed 7th with her team. She captured the gold medal with her team at the 2021 World Deaf Volleyball Championships in Chianciano Terme, Italy. With her team, she won the gold medal at the 2021 Caxias do Sul in Brazil, which took place in 2022. In 2023, she won the silver medal at the 11th European Deaf Volleyball Championships in Karabük, Turkey. In 2024 at the World Deaf Volleyball Championships in Tomigusuku, Okinawa, Japan, her team took the fourth place. She won the silver medal at the 2025 Tokyo in Japan.

== Personal life ==
Born in 2000, Fikriye Hülür is a native of Gölköy District in Ordu Province, northern Turkey. She became deaf as a result of a seizure she contracted when she was six months old.

She studied at Ordu University.
