= Yeter Yalçın =

Turkish volleyball player (born 1988)

Personal information
- Full name: Yeter Ilıca Yalçın
- Nationality: Turkish
- Born: Yeter Ilıca; 2 February 1988 (age 38) Ankara, Turkey
- Height: 1.85 m (6 ft 1 in)

Volleyball information
- Position: Middle blocker

Career
- Years: Team
- 2000–2007: İlbank; Tarsus Bld.
- 2007–2008: Gazi Üniversitesi
- 2008–2015: VakıfBank; Trabzon İdmanocağı; Çankaya Bld. Pursaklar İhtisas
- 2015–2016: Karayolları
- 2015–2016: Kazan Bld.
- 2016–2017: Yeşilyurt
- 2022–2023: Numune DSI,İ
- 2023–2024: Zeren
- 2023–2024: TMS Voleybol
- 2024–2025: Temiz Enerji Birliği
Honours
Representing Turkey
Women's volleyball
Deaflympics
Silver medal – second place	2025 Tokyo	Team
Gold medal – first place	2021 Caxias do Sul	Team
World Championships
Gold medal – first place	2021 Chianciano Terme	Team
European Championships
Silver medal – second place	2023 Karabük	Team

Yeter Yalçın (née Yeter Ilıca; 2 February 1988), also known as Yeter Ilıca Yalçın, is a Turkish female retired volleyball player who has also played beach volleyball. She played in the middle blocker position. She was a member of the Turkey national girls' cadet, women's junior, women's deaf volleyball and deaf beach volleyball teams. She is a preschool teacher.

== Club career ==
Yalçın started playing volleyball already in 2000. She entered the cadet team of İlbank in her hometown, Ankara. With İlbank, she played in the top-level Sultans League for two seasons. She was with Tarsus Bld. before she joined Gazi Üniversitesi in her hometown in the 2007–08 season. She then played for VakıfBank, Trabzon İdmanocağı, Çankaya Bld. and Pursaklar İhtisas between 2008 and 2015. She then played for Karayolları, Kazan Bld., Numune DSİ, Zeren, TMS Voleybol and Temiz Enerji Birliği between 2015 and 2025. In the 2016–17 season, she was in Istanbul with Yeşilyurt. In August 2017, she returned to Ankara, and transferred to Keçiören Bld.

She is 1.85 m (6 ft 1 in) tall, and plays in the middle blocker position. On 15 December 2025, she announced that she ended her volleyball playing career.

== International career ==
Yalçın became a member of the national girls' cadet team in 2005, and later of the national women's junior team, playing in a total time of six years. In 2013, she was selected to the Turkey women's national deaf volleyball team. She was the oldest team member, and served as the team captain more than ten years long.

She took part in the Beach Volleyball Championship at the 2013 Sofia Deaflympics in Bulgaria. She and her teammate Kezban Çağla Ateş ranked last at eight place. In 2015, she played at the 9th European Deaf Volleyball Championships in Paris, France, where she placed fourth with her r-team after losing to Ukraine in the semifinals. T At the 2017 Samsun Deaflympics in Turkey, she placed with her team seventh defeating Brazil. She captured the gold medal with her team at the 2021 World Deaf Volleyball Championships in Chianciano Terme, Italy. She competed in the Volleyball at the Summer Deaflympics. With her team, she won the gold medal at the 2021 Caxias do Sul Deaflympics in Brazil, which took place in 2022. In 2023, she won the silver medal at the 11th European Deaf Volleyball Championships in Karabük, Turkey. She won the silver medal at the 2025 Tokyo Deaflympics in Japan.

== Personal life ==
Yeter Yalçın, maiden name Ilıca, was born in Ankara, Turkey on 2 February 1988.

In 2014, she started to work as a preschool teacher at Nevşehir Hacı Bektaş Veli University's kindergarten.
