= Ayşe Beril Boyacı =

Turkish judoka (born 2008)

Personal information
- Nationality: Turkish
- Born: 2008 (age 17–18) Kırıkkale, Turkey
- Occupation: Judoka

Sport
- Country: Turkey
- Sport: Judo
- Disability class: Deaf
- Event: -52 kg
- Club: Kırıkkale GSK
Medal record
Women's judo
Representing Turkey
Deaflympics
Bronze medal – third place	2025 Tokyo	Team

Ayşe Beril Boyacı (born 2008) is a Turkish female judoka who competes in the -52 kg division.

== Sport career ==
Boyacı competes in the -52 kg division. She wears the brown belt, and is a member of Kırıkkale GSK.

She competed at the Deaflympics of 2025 in Tokyo, Japan. She won a bronze medal in the team event, with her teammates Buse Tıraş, Elif Gülşen, Esma Gökülü, Bircan Altuntaş and Yadigar Talayhan.

== Personal life ==
Born in 2008, Ayşe Beril Boyacı is a native of Kırıkkale, Turkey.

She is a student of Şehit Hakan Yorulmaz Sports High School in Yahşihan District of Kırıkkale.
