= Bircan Altuntaş =

Turkish judoka (born 2001)

Personal information
- Nationality: Turkish
- Born: 2001 (age 24–25) Aybastı Ordu, Turkey
- Occupation: Judoka

Sport
- Country: Turkey
- Sport: Judo
- Disability class: Deaf
- Event: -70 kg
- Club: Pamukkale Deaf Sports Club
Medal record
Women's judo
Representing Turkey
Deaflympics
Bronze medal – third place	2025 Tokyo	Team

Bircan Altuntaş (born 2001) is a Turkish female judoka who competes in the -70 kg division.

== Sport career ==
Altuntaş competes in the -70 kg division. She wears the yellow-on-white belt, and is a member of Pamukkale Deaf Sports Club in Denizli.

She competed at the Deaflympics of 2025 in Tokyo, Japan. She won a bronze medal in the team event, with her teammates Buse Tıraş, Elif Gülşen, Esma Gökülü, Ayşe Beril Boyacı and Yadigar Talayhan.

== Personal life ==
Bircan Altuntaş was born in Alacalar Neighborhood of Aybastı District in Ordu, northern Turkey in 2001. Her father is İsmet Altuntaş.
