= Handball at the 2021 Summer Deaflympics =

Deaflympics event

- Location: Brazil, Caxias Do Sul
- Dates: 2–14 May

Champions
- Men: Croatia
- Women: Denmark

Handball at the 2021 Summer Deaflympics will held in Caxias Do Sul, Brazil from 2 to 14 May 2022.

== Medal summary ==
* Host nation (Brazil)

Rank	NOC	Gold	Silver	Bronze	Total
1	Croatia (CRO)	1	0	0	1
1	Denmark (DEN)	1	0	0	1
3	Germany (GER)	0	1	0	1
3	Turkey (TUR)	0	1	0	1
5	Brazil (BRA)	0	0	1	1
5	Serbia (SRB)	0	0	1	1
Totals (6 entries)		2	2	2	6

== Medalists ==
Event	Gold	Silver	Bronze
Men's team	Croatia (CRO)	Germany (GER)	Serbia (SRB)
Women's team	Denmark (DEN)	Turkey (TUR)	Brazil (BRA)

== Men's competition ==
=== Group stage ===
==== Pool A ====
Pos	Team	Pld	W	D	L	GF	GA	GD	Pts	Qualification
1	Germany	4	4	0	0	123	62	61	8	Semifinals
2	Serbia	4	3	0	1	101	62	39	6	Semifinals
3	Kenya	4	1	1	2	64	90	-26	3	Classification
4	Brazil	4	1	1	2	55	92	-37	3	Classification

3 May 2022	Brazil	10 – 34	Serbia	Ginásio Poliesportivo da UCS, Caxias Do Sul

5 May 2022	Serbia	25 – 30	Germany	Ginásio Poliesportivo da UCS, Caxias Do Sul

Germany	43 – 17	Kenya	Ginásio Poliesportivo da UCS, Caxias Do Sul

9 May 2022	Serbia	32 – 22	Kenya	Ginásio Poliesportivo da UCS, Caxias Do Sul

Brazil	20 – 43	Germany	Ginásio Poliesportivo da UCS, Caxias Do Sul

11 May 2022	Kenya	15 – 15	Brazil	Ginásio Poliesportivo da UCS, Caxias Do Sul

==== Pool B ====
Pos	Team	Pld	W	D	L	GF	GA	GD	Pts	Qualification
1	Croatia	4	4	0	0	126	44	82	8	Semifinals
2	Turkey	4	3	0	1	101	61	40	6	Semifinals
3	Denmark	4	2	0	2	62	47	15	4	Classification
4	Ghana	4	1	0	3	56	153	-97	2	Classification

3 May 2022	Turkey	20 – 35	Croatia	Ginásio Poliesportivo da UCS, Caxias Do Sul

3 May 2022	Croatia	40 – 11	Denmark	Ginásio Poliesportivo da UCS, Caxias Do Sul

5 May 2022	Ghana	8 – 43	Turkey	Ginásio Poliesportivo da UCS, Caxias Do Sul

5 May 2022	Ghana	13 – 41	Croatia	Ginásio Poliesportivo da UCS, Caxias Do Sul

7 May 2022	Turkey	28 – 18	Denmark	Ginásio Poliesportivo da UCS, Caxias Do Sul

7 May 2022	Ghana	7 – 41	Denmark	Ginásio Poliesportivo da UCS, Caxias Do Sul

=== Knockout stage ===
Semifinals
13 May
Germany	34
Turkey	22
13 May
Croatia	32
Serbia	18

Gold medal
14 May
Germany	21
Croatia	32
Bronze medal
14 May
Turkey	17
Serbia	23

=== Classification ===
5th place match
12 May
Kenya	18
Denmark	26

7th place match
12 May
Ghana	33
Brazil	11

== Women's competition ==
=== Group stage ===
==== Pool A ====
Pos	Team	Pld	W	D	L	GF	GA	GD	Pts	Qualification
1	Denmark	4	4	0	0	112	41	71	8	Semifinals
2	Turkey	4	3	0	1	129	58	71	6	Semifinals
3	Brazil	4	2	0	2	88	83	5	4	Semifinals
4	Kenya	4	1	0	3	79	100	-21	2	Semifinals
5	Argentina	4	0	0	4	13	106	-93	0	

2 May 2022	Turkey	43 – 16	Kenya	Ginásio Poliesportivo da UCS, Caxias Do Sul

Argentina	4 – 36	Brazil	Ginásio Poliesportivo da UCS, Caxias Do Sul

4 May 2022	Kenya	12 – 28	Denmark	Ginásio Poliesportivo da UCS, Caxias Do Sul

Brazil	18 – 35	Turkey	Ginásio Poliesportivo da UCS, Caxias Do Sul

6 May 2022	Kenya	16 – 26	Brazil	Ginásio Poliesportivo da UCS, Caxias Do Sul

Denmark	38 – 5	Argentina	Ginásio Poliesportivo da UCS, Caxias Do Sul

8 May 2022	Argentina	3 – 35	Kenya	Ginásio Poliesportivo da UCS, Caxias Do Sul

Turkey	16 – 18	Denmark	Ginásio Poliesportivo da UCS, Caxias Do Sul

10 May 2022	Argentina	6 – 35	Turkey	Ginásio Poliesportivo da UCS, Caxias Do Sul

Brazil	8 – 28	Denmark	Ginásio Poliesportivo da UCS, Caxias Do Sul

=== Knockout stage ===
Semifinals
12 May
Denmark	31
Kenya	8
12 May
Turkey	37
Brazil	17

Gold medal
14 May
Denmark	16
Turkey	15
Bronze medal
14 May
Brazil	24
Kenya	15
