= Selinay Akçin =

Turkish volleyball player (born 2000)

Personal information
- Nationality: Turkish
- Born: 1 January 2000 (age 26); Manisa, Turkey
- Height: 1.78 m (5 ft 10 in)

Volleyball information
- Position: Opposite hitter
- Current club: Fethiye Zirve
- Number: 10

Career
Years
- 2015–2018
- 2017–2019
- 2018–2019
- 2019–2020
- 2020–2021
- 2021–2022
- 2022–2023
- 2023–2024
- 2024–2025
- 2024–2025
- 2025–2026
- 2055–
Teams
- Ata
- Gölcük İhsaniye
- Aydın BB
- Turgutlu Bld.
- Akhisargücü
- Turgutlu Bld.
- Aksaray 1989
- Manisa BB
- Ayvalık Gelişim
- Denizli BB
- Didem Bld.
- Fethiye Zirve
Honours
Representing Turkey
Women's volleyball
Deaflympics
Silver medal – second place	2025 Tokyo	Team
Gold medal – first place	2021 Caxias do Sul	Team
World Championships
Gold medal – first place	2021 Chianciano Terme	Team
European Championships
Silver medal – second place	2023 Karabük	Team

Selinay Akçin (born 1 January 2000) is a Turkish female deaf volleyball player. She plays in the opposite hitter position.

== Club career ==
Akçin started volleyball playing in her hometown Manisa, entering the academy team of Ata Spor in the 2015–16 season. She was also in the academy team of Soma SK. After three seasons, she transferred to Gölcük İhsaniye SK in Kocaeli. She then played in clubs at various cities, including Aydın BB, Turgutlu Bld., Akhisargücü, Turgutlu Bld. again, Aksaray 1989, Manisa BB, Ayvalık Gelişim, Denizli BB and Didem Bld. for one season respectively. In the 2025–26 season, she plays for Fethiye Zirve in Muğla.

She is 1.78 m (5 ft 10 in) tall, and plays in the opposşte hitter position.

== International career ==
Akçin is a member of the Turkey women's national deaf volleyball team. She captured the gold medal with her team at the 2021 World Deaf Volleyball Championships in Chianciano Terme, Italy. She competed at the Summer Deaflympics. With her team, she won the gold medal at the 2021 Caxias do Sul Deaflympics in Brazil, which took place in 2022. In 2023, she won the silver medal at the 11th European Deaf Volleyball Championships in Karabük, Turkey. She won the silver medal at the 2025 Tokyo Deaflympics in Japan.

== Personal life ==
Selinay Akçin was born in Manisa, western Turkey, on 1 January 2000.
