= Elif Gülşen =

Turkish judoka (born 1995)

Personal information
- Nationality: Turkish
- Born: 1998 (age 27–28) Turkey
- Occupation: Judoka

Sport
- Country: Turkey
- Sport: Judo
- Disability class: Deaf
- Event: +78 kg
Medal record
Women's judo
Representing Turkey
Deaflympics
Bronze medal – third place	2025 Tokyo	+78 kg
Bronze medal – third place	2025 Tokyo	Team

Elif Gülşen (born 1998) is a Turkish female judoka who competes in the +78 kg division.

== Sport career ==
Gülşen competed in the +78 kg event at the Deaflympics of 2025 in Tokyo, Japan. She won a bronze medal in her division's event, and another bronze medal in the team event at the 2025 Deaflympics, with her teammates Buse Tıraş, Esma Gökülü, Bircan Altuntaş, Ayşe Beril Boyacı and Yadigar Talayhan.

== Personal life ==
Elif Gülşen was born in 1998.
