= Belenkov =

Belenkov (masculine, Russian: Беленков) or Belenkova (feminine, Russian: Беленкова) is a Russian surname. Notable people with the surname include:

- Aleksei Belenkov (born 1957), Russian footballer
- Tamara Belenkova (1958–2017), Ukrainian deaf volleyballist
