= Kezban (name) =

Kezban is a Turkish feminine given name. Notable people with the name include:

- Kezban Çağla Ateş (born 1988), Turkish volleyball player
- Kezban Tağ (born 1993), Turkish football player
