= Malaysia at the 2021 Summer Deaflympics =

- IOC code: MAS
- National federation: Malaysian Deaf Sports Association
- Website: www.msdeaf.org.my

in Caxias do Sul 1 – 15 May 2022
- Competitors: 11 (9 men and 2 women) in 4 sports
- Flag bearer: Yilamaran Vispalinggam
- Medals Ranked 18th: Gold 2 Silver 4 Bronze 1 Total 7

Summer Deaflympics appearances (overview)
- 1993; 1997; 2001; 2005; 2009; 2013; 2017; 2021

Malaysia competed at the 2021 Summer Deaflympics at Caxias do Sul, Brazil from 1 to 15 May 2022.

== Medalists ==
Medal	Name	Sport	Event	Date
Gold	Boon Wei Ying; Foo Zu Tung	Badminton	Women's doubles	11 May
Gold	Hong Siong Mui; Huwainaa Danduan Abdullah; Zuriana Roslan; Peng Kam Cheng; Hie Siw Sing; Nor Misha Nathera	Bowling	Women's team	29 October
Silver	Yilamaran Vispalinggam	Karate	Men's Kumite -84kg	2 May
Silver	Edmund Teo Seng Keong; Boon Wei Ying	Badminton	Mixed doubles	11 May
Silver	Mohammad Syahmi Abdul Hamid; Mohd Zaidi Awang; Mohd Firdaus Mohamad	Bowling	Men's trios	26 October
Silver	Mohammad Syahmi Abdul Hamid; Mohd Zaidi Awang; Choon Seng Ho; Edmondson Kok Leng; Mohd Firdaus Mohamad; Chew Hoong Wong	Bowling	Men's team	29 October
Bronze	Boon Wei Ying	Badminton	Women's singles	11 May

== Athletics ==
- Mohammad Faza Firdaus Ghazali
- Muhammad Irshad Saizul
- Muhammad Shahrul Azmer Azman
- Nor Shahdan Mohamad
- Zaiman Megat Abu

== Badminton ==
- Edmund Teo Seng Keong
- Muhamad Shafiq Hasan
- Boon Wei Ying
- Foo Zu Tung

== Cycling ==
- Ramly Ismail

== Karate ==
- Yilamaran Vispalinggam
