= Ukraine at the 1997 Summer Deaflympics =

- IOC code: UKR
- NOC: Ukraine Deaf Sports Federation
- Website: deafsport.org.ua (in Ukrainian)

in Copenhagen, Denmark 13 July 1997 – 26 July 1997
- Competitors: 70 in 7 sports
- Medals Ranked 8th: Gold 5 Silver 10 Bronze 5 Total 20

Summer Deaflympics appearances
- 1924; 1928; 1931; 1935; 1939; 1949; 1953; 1957; 1961; 1965; 1969; 1973; 1977; 1981; 1985; 1989; 1993; 1997; 2001; 2005; 2009; 2013; 2017; 2021

Ukraine competed at the 1997 Summer Deaflympics in Copenhagen from 13 to 26 July 1997. It was the nation's second consecutive appearance at the Summer Deaflympics in the post-Soviet era after the disintegration of the Soviet Union.

== Medalists ==
Medal	Name	Sport	Event
Gold	Hennadiy Holovkin	Athletics	Men's 400 metres hurdles
Gold	Tetiana Yakimchuk	Athletics	Women's 400 metres hurdles
Gold	Sviatoslav Kovtun; Dmytro Diachenko; Hennadiy Holovkin; Oleksandr Khodakov	Athletics	Men's 4x400 metres relay
Gold	Svitlana Horodok; Iryna Kuznetsova; Tetiana Yakimchuk; Inna Zverynska	Athletics	Women's 4x400 metres relay
Gold	Ukrainian national men's deaflympic volleyball team: Oleksandr Biloblotskyi; Roman Budzinskyi; Leonid Deineka; Roman Heriy; Vadym Iuriev; Askold Koshkarov; Andrii Lailo; Dmytro Lazarevych; Oleksandr Pominchuk; Viktor Rozbytskyi	Volleyball	Men's tournament
Silver	Hennadiy Holovkin	Athletics	Men's 400 metres
Silver	Inna Zverynska	Athletics	Women's 400 metres hurdles
Silver	Tetiana Yakimchuk	Athletics	Women's 400 metres
Silver	Oleksandr Sankin	Orienteering	Men's sprint distance
Silver	Oleksandr Sankin; Oleksandr Iuryk; Oleh Lavruk	Orienteering	Men's relay
Silver	Ganna Lytvynenko	Swimming	Women's 100 metres freestyle
Silver	Mykola Zakladnyi; Nataliya Bozhko	Table tennis	Mixed doubles
Silver	Ukrainian national women's deaflympic volleyball team: Tamara Belenkova; Natalia Buriak; Lilia Chkhun; Inna Dergunova; Olena Evstratova; Halyna Nemialkovska; Natalia Nikolaieva; Larysa Sinchuk; Yuliya Soliaryk; Lilia Tiaka	Volleyball	Women's tournament
Silver	Georgiy Koiev	Wrestling	Men's freestyle -54 kg
Silver	Ruslan Bielavskyi	Wrestling	Men's Greco-Roman 85-97 kg
Bronze	Andrii Benteha	Athletics	Men's 400 metres
Bronze	Andrii Benteha; Dmytro Diachenko; Hennadiy Holovkin; Oleksandr Khodakov	Athletics	Men's 4x100 metres relay
Bronze	Svitlana Horodok; Iryna Kuznetsova; Tetiana Yakimchuk; Inna Zverynska	Athletics	Women's 4x100 metres relay
Bronze	Oleksandr Sankin	Orienteering	Men's long distance
Bronze	Volodymyr Stepanov	Wrestling	Men's Greco-Roman 76-85 kg
