= Grancy Kandagor =

Kenyan long-distance runner

Personal information
- Full name: Grancy Jebichii Kandagor
- Born: 2000 (age 25–26)

Sport
- Country: Kenya
Medal record
Women's athletics
Representing Kenya
Deaflympics
Bronze medal – third place	Caxias do Sul 2021	10000m

Grancy Jebichii Kandagor (born 2000) is a Kenyan track and field athlete who has specialized in long-distance running.

== Career ==
She made her maiden Deaflympic appearance during the 2021 Summer Deaflympics (held in May 2022) and claimed her first Deaflympic medal during the course of the multi-sport event in the women's 10000m event. She was initially in firm contention of winning the gold in 10000m event but eventually lost her way out as she picked up a knee injury after falling down during the race. She settled for a bronze medal and she insisted that they planned for a Kenyan podium finish in the event but the plans were ruined with few stumbling blocks. Coincidentally, her fellow Kenyan compatriot Serah Wangari claimed silver medal in the same competition. The medal achievements of both Wangari and Grancy is also the first time that Kenya had secured a medal in the 10000m race at a Deaflympic event. The medals were also the first set of medals won by Kenya at the 2021 Summer Deaflympics.
