= Esma Gökülü =

Turkish judoka (born 2005)

Personal information
- Nationality: Turkish
- Born: 2005 (age 20–21) Turkey
- Occupation: Judoka
- Weight: 63 kg (139 lb) (2012)

Sport
- Country: Turkey
- Sport: Judo
- Disability class: Deaf
- Event: -63 kg
- Club: Konya Metropolitan Municipality SK
Medal record
Women's judo
Representing Turkey
World Championships
Bronze medal – third place	2021 Paris	-63 kg
Deaflympics
Bronze medal – third place	2025 Tokyo	-63 kg
Bronze medal – third place	2025 Tokyo	Team
Silver medal – second place	2021 Caxias do Sul	-63 kg
- Updated on 7 October 2024

Esma Gökülü (born 2005) is a Turkish female judoka who competes in the -63 kg division.

== Sport career ==
Gökülü got interested in judo in the third grade of primary school, and joined judo course at summer school during the vacation. She has been performing judo since 2012 with the support of her family. She is a member of Konya Metropolitan Municipality Sports Club in her hometown, at which she wears the 3rd dan black belt.

She won a bronze medal at the 2021 World Deaf Judo Championships in Paris, France. She competed in the -63 kg event at the Deaflympics of 2021 in Caxias do Sul, Brazil, which was held in 2022, and 2025 in Tokyo, Japan. In the -63 kg event, she won the silver medal at the 2021 Deaflympic, and a bronze medal at the 2025 Deaflympics. She took another bronze medal in the team event of the 2025 Tokyo Deaflympics, with her teammates Buse Tıraş, Elif Gülşen, Bircan Altuntaş, Ayşe Beril Boyacı and Yadigar Talayhan.

In 2022, four months after the Deaflympics in Brazil, she suffered anterior cruciate ligament rupture, and had undergone surgery. In 2024, she again suffered an injury of the same type. She, however, postponed a surgery in order to compete at the 2025 Tokyo Deaflympics, where she was able to step up to the podium twice.

== Personal life ==
Born in 2005, Esma Gökülü is a native of Konya, central Turkey. She completely lost hearing in the left ear and had 50% hearing in the right ear due to a seizure she suffered as a child.

She graduated from the Aliya İzzetbegoviç Anadolu High School in Selçuklu, Konya. As of 2025, she is a student of sports coaching in the third year at Selçuk University.
