= Oleksii Kolomiiets =

Ukrainian swimmer (born 1997)

Personal information
- National team: Ukraine
- Born: 1997 (age 28–29)

Sport
- Country: Ukraine
- Sport: Swimming
Medal record
Men's swimming
Representing Ukraine
Event / 1st / 2nd / 3rd; Deaflympics / 1 / 1 / 1
Deaflympics
Gold medal – first place	Caxias Do Sul 2021	50m butterfly
Gold medal – first place	Caxias Do Sul 2021	100m breaststroke
Silver medal – second place	Samsun 2017	50m breaststroke
Bronze medal – third place	Samsun 2017	4 × 100m medley relay

Oleksii Kolomiiets (Ukrainian: Олексій Коломієць; born 1997) is a Ukrainian deaf swimmer. He made his Deaflympic debut during the 2017 Summer Deaflympics.

== Career ==
He competed at the 2017 Summer Deaflympics in Samsun and claimed two medals in his debut appearance at the multi-sport event. He claimed a silver medal in the men's 50m breaststroke and also clinched a bronze in men's 4 × 100m medley relay. He also competed and qualified for the final rounds in men's 100m breaststroke and 200m breaststroke events finishing at fourth and fifth places respectively.

He made his second Deaflympic appearance representing Ukraine at the 2021 Summer Deaflympics (held in May 2022) and he was one of the first gold medalists since the start of the 2021 Deaflympics in Brazil after claiming a gold medal in the men's 50m butterfly event. He also later went onto clinch a gold in the men's 100m breaststroke category.
