= Yadigar Talayhan =

Turkish judoka (born 1995)

Personal information
- Nationality: Turkish
- Born: 1995 (age 30–31) Söke, Manisa, Turkey
- Occupation: Judoka
- Weight: 78 kg (172 lb)

Sport
- Country: Turkey
- Sport: Judo
- Disability class: Deaf
- Event: -78 kg
- Club: 1922 Salihli GSK
Medal record
Women's judo
Representing Turkey
Deaflympics
Bronze medal – third place	2025 Tokyo	-78 kg
Bronze medal – third place	2025 Tokyo	Team
Bronze medal – third place	2021 Caxias do Sul	-78 kg

Yadigar Talayhan (born 1995) is a Turkish female judoka who competes in the -78 kg division.

== Sport career ==
Talayhan started performing judo in 2018 with the encouragement of her national deaf wrestler spouse.

She is a member of 1922 Salihli GSK.

She competed in the -78 kg event at the Deaflympics of 2021 in Caxias do Sul, Brazil, which was held in 2022, and 2025 in Tokyo, Japan. In the -78 kg event, she won a bronze medal at the 2021 Deaflympic, and again a bronze medal in her division's event and another bronze medal in the team event at the 2025 Deaflympics, with her teammates Buse Tıraş, Elif Gülşen, Esma Gökülü, Bircan Altuntaş and Ayşe Beril Boyacı.

== Personal life ==
Born in 1995, Yadigar Talayhan is a native of Söke in Manisa, western Turkey. She lives in Salihli.

On 30 June 2012, she married to Önder Talayhan, a 2009 Summer Deaflympics bronze-medalist deaf wrestler from Söke. She is a mother of three children.
