= Sinem Başgöynük =

Turkish volleyball player (born 2003)

Personal information
- Full name: Ayşe Sinem Başgöynük
- Nationality: Turkish
- Born: 17 July 2003 (age 23); Turkey
- Height: 1.75 m (5 ft 9 in)

Volleyball information
- Position: Setter
- Current club: Kuzey Yıldızları
- Number: 1

Career
Years
- 2017–2020
- 2020–2021
- 2021–2023
- 2023–2024
- 2024
- 2024–
Teams
- Küçükyalı Yelken
- Altınyurt
- Beykoz Bld.
- Lima
- Nar Kumaşçılık Çengelköy Voleybol
- Kuzey Yıldızları
Honours
Representing Turkey
Women's volleyball
Deaflympics
Silver medal – second place	2025 Tokyo	Team
Gold medal – first place	2021 Caxias do Sul	Team
World Championships
Gold medal – first place	2021 Chianciano Terme	Team
European Championships
Silver medal – second place	2023 Karabük	Team

Ayşe Sinem Başgöynük (born 17 July 2003) is a Turkish female deaf volleyball player. She plays in the setter position.

== Club career ==
Başgöynük started playing volleyball in the 2017–18 season for Küçükyalı Yelken SK. In 2020, she transferred to Altınyurt SK, where she was one season. She then moved to Beykoz Bld. GSK and played two seasons until 2023. After the 2023–24 season with Lima SK, she joined Nar Kumaşçılık Çengelköy Voleybol, where she appeared in 2024. In the second half of the 2024–25 Turkish Women's Volleyball Second League season, she transferred to Kuzey Yıldızları SK.

She is 1.75 m (5 ft 9 in) tall and plays in the setter position.

== International career ==
Başgöynük is a member of the Turkey women's national deaf volleyball team. She captured the gold medal with her team at the 2021 World Deaf Volleyball Championships in Chianciano Terme, Italy. She competed at the Summer Deaflympics. With her team, she won the gold medal at the 2021 Caxias do Sul Deaflympics in Brazil, which took place in 2022. In 2023, she won the silver medal at the 11th European Deaf Volleyball Championships in Karabük, Turkey. She won the silver medal at the 2025 Tokyo Deaflympics in Japan.

== Personal life ==
Ayşe Sinem Başgöynük was bırn on 17 July 2003. She lives in Istanbul, Turkey.
