= Judo at the 2021 Summer Deaflympics =

Deaflympics event

Judo Judo at the 2021 Summer Deaflympics
- Venue: Recreio da Juventude
- Location: Brazil, Caxias Do Sul
- Dates: 3–5 May

Judo at the 2021 Summer Deaflympics was held in Caxias Do Sul, Brazil from 3 to 5 May 2022.

== Medal summary ==
* Host nation (Brazil)

Rank	NOC	Gold	Silver	Bronze	Total
1	Ukraine (UKR)	5	2	6	13
2	South Korea (KOR)	2	6	2	10
3	Iran (IRI)	2	2	1	5
4	United States (USA)	2	0	0	2
5	Kazakhstan (KAZ)	1	2	6	9
6	France (FRA)	1	0	3	4
7	Chile (CHI)	1	0	0	1
7	Mexico (MEX)	1	0	0	1
7	Netherlands (NED)	1	0	0	1
10	Turkey (TUR)	0	2	3	5
11	Poland (POL)	0	2	0	2
12	Algeria (ALG)	0	0	2	2
12	Brazil (BRA)*	0	0	2	2
12	Venezuela (VEN)	0	0	2	2
15	Argentina (ARG)	0	0	1	1
15	Armenia (ARM)	0	0	1	1
15	Hungary (HUN)	0	0	1	1
15	Kyrgyzstan (KGZ)	0	0	1	1
15	Mongolia (MGL)	0	0	1	1
Totals (19 entries)		16	16	32	64

== Medalists ==
=== Men's events ===
Event	Gold	Silver	Bronze
Men -60 kg	Albert Westerhof; Netherlands	N. Aldiek; Kazakhstan	Robert Gevorgyan; Armenia
Men -60 kg	Albert Westerhof; Netherlands	N. Aldiek; Kazakhstan	Erkan Esenboğa; Turkey
Men -66 kg	J. Choque Tapia; Chile	Ali Salahshour; Iran	R. Crispim; Brazil
Men -66 kg	J. Choque Tapia; Chile	Ali Salahshour; Iran	V. Nozyrev; Ukraine
Men -73 kg	Amir Mohammad Daftari; Iran	H. Hwang; South Korea	D. Sheretov; Ukraine
Men -73 kg	Amir Mohammad Daftari; Iran	H. Hwang; South Korea	S. Kanapiyanov; Kazakhstan
Men -81 kg	Yerkebulan Kanafin; Kazakhstan	Minseok Kim; South Korea	Patrik Ötvös; Hungary
Men -81 kg	Yerkebulan Kanafin; Kazakhstan	Minseok Kim; South Korea	Raphael Ourednik; France
Men -90 kg	Luka Netiaha; Ukraine	Hossein Allahkarimi; Iran	Yang Jung Mu; South Korea
Men -90 kg	Luka Netiaha; Ukraine	Hossein Allahkarimi; Iran	Alexandre Fernandes; Brazil
Men -100 kg	Mehrdad Seidi; Iran	Volodymyr Maklakov; Ukraine	Sabirzhan Khapizov; Kazakhstan
Men -100 kg	Mehrdad Seidi; Iran	Volodymyr Maklakov; Ukraine	Arthur Repiquet; France
Men +100 kg	Amadou Meite; France	Samet Bulut; Turkey	Kanalbek Ilgiz Uulu; Kyrgyzstan
Men +100 kg	Amadou Meite; France	Samet Bulut; Turkey	Masoud Rastegar; Iran
Men Team	Ukraine (UKR)	South Korea (KOR)	France (FRA)
Men Team	Ukraine (UKR)	South Korea (KOR)	Kazakhstan (KAZ)

=== Women's events ===
Event	Gold	Silver	Bronze
Women -48 kg	M. Huitron; Mexico	R. Gwon; South Korea	N. Nenko; Ukraine
Women -48 kg	M. Huitron; Mexico	R. Gwon; South Korea	F. Kara Ogly; Kazakhstan
Women -52 kg	A.Shostak; Ukraine	D.Bouek; Poland	Y.Bensalah; Algeria
Women -52 kg	A.Shostak; Ukraine	D.Bouek; Poland	D.Irzzha Nova; Kazakhstan
Women -57 kg	J.Santos; Portugal	H.Lee; South Korea	K.Andrieieva; Ukraine
Women -57 kg	J.Santos; Portugal	H.Lee; South Korea	M.Rodriguez; Venezuela
Women -63 kg	Kateryna Shepeliuk; Ukraine	Esma Gökülü; Turkey	Wilnaryuri Mendez; Venezuela
Women -63 kg	Kateryna Shepeliuk; Ukraine	Esma Gökülü; Turkey	Jinhee Lee; South Korea
Women -70 kg	Sunhee Choi; South Korea	Maryna Pogorelova; Ukraine	Baatar Oyundelgerekh; Mongolia
Women -70 kg	Sunhee Choi; South Korea	Maryna Pogorelova; Ukraine	Valentina Bonfanti; Argentina
Women -78 kg	Eunmi Hong; South Korea	Anna Kramorova; Kazakhstan	Yadigar Talayhan; Turkey
Women -78 kg	Eunmi Hong; South Korea	Anna Kramorova; Kazakhstan	Oksana Kravchenko; Ukraine
Women +78 kg	Nina Cutro-Kelly; United States	Natalia Brzykcy; Poland	Bouchra Sadi; Algeria
Women +78 kg	Nina Cutro-Kelly; United States	Natalia Brzykcy; Poland	Mariia Bala; Ukraine
Woman Team	Ukraine (UKR)	South Korea (KOR)	Turkey (TUR)
Woman Team	Ukraine (UKR)	South Korea (KOR)	Kazakhstan (KAZ)
