= Sinem =

Sinem is a Turkish feminine given name, from Persian "sine"+ Turkish first person pronoun "m"; meaning “my heart”, “my chest”, “darling”. The given name is also popular among Turkish-Circassians because Sinem means "my eyes" in the Circassian language, meaning my dear. It may refer to:

== Given name ==
- Sinem Balık (born 1974), Turkish opera singer
- Sinem Banna (born 1968), Turkish-American artist
- Sinem Barut (born 1986), Turkish volleyball player
- Sinem Başgöynük (born 2003), Turkish volleyball player
- Sinem Dybvad Demir (born 1992), Danish politician
- Sinem Doğu (born 1987), Turkish female ice hockey player
- Sinem Kobal (born 1987), Turkish television and film actress
- Sinem Oruç (born 2007), Turkish judoka
- Sinem Özkan (born 2002), Turkish karateka
- Sinem Öztürk (born 1985), Turkish actress and presenter
- Sinem Saban, Australian film writer, producer, director, and human rights activist
- Sinem Ünsal (born 1993), Turkish actress
- Sinem Vatan Güney (born 1996), Turkish handball player

== See also ==
- Akap Sinem, Turkish volleyball player
