= Ukraine at the 2021 Summer Deaflympics =

- IOC code: UKR
- NOC: Ukraine Deaf Sports Federation
- Website: deafsport.org.ua (in Ukrainian)

in Caxias do Sul, Brazil 1 May 2022 – 15 May 2022
- Competitors: 170 in 15 sports
- Medals Ranked 1st: Gold 64 Silver 39 Bronze 42 Total 145

Summer Deaflympics appearances
- 1924; 1928; 1931; 1935; 1939; 1949; 1953; 1957; 1961; 1965; 1969; 1973; 1977; 1981; 1985; 1989; 1993; 1997; 2001; 2005; 2009; 2013; 2017; 2021

Ukraine competed at the 2021 Summer Deaflympics in Caxias do Sul from 1 to 15 May 2022. It was the nation's eighth consecutive appearance at the Summer Deaflympics in the post-Soviet era and the first since the Russian invasion of Ukraine. Ukraine finished at top of the medal table, winning 64 gold medals.

== Medalists ==
Medal	Name	Sport	Event	Date
Gold	Oleksandr Cherniaiev	Karate	Men's kata	2 May
Gold	Oleksandr Makhno	Karate	Kumite -84 kg	2 May
Gold	Karina Yanchuk	Karate	Kumite -68 kg	2 May
Gold	Yelizaveta Topchaniuk	Cycling	Women's road sprint	2 May
Gold	Illia Sultanov	Swimming	Men's 50 metres butterfly	2 May
Gold	Illia Sultanov; Maksym Dudnyk; Oleksii Lytvynenko; Oleksii Kolomiiets	Swimming	Men's 4x100 metres freestyle relay	2 May
Gold	Vladyslav Kremliakov	Swimming	Men's 200 metres backstroke	3 May
Gold	Oleksii Kolomiiets	Swimming	Men's 50 metres breaststroke	3 May
Gold	Yurii Haiduchenko; Oleksandr Makhno; Volodymyr Makhno; Oleksandr Cherniaiev; Mykola Pantiushyn; Yevhenii Neporad	Karate	Men's kumite team	3 May
Gold	Marina Hubanova	Karate	Kumite -50 kg	3 May
Gold	Katerina Maslo	Karate	Kumite -55 kg	3 May
Gold	Anna Shostak	Judo	Women's -52 kg	3 May
Gold	Illia Sultanov	Swimming	Men's 100 metres freestyle	4 May
Gold	Yurii Haiduchenko	Karate	Men's -67 kg	4 May
Gold	Tetiana Khil; Inessa Prychyna; Svitlana Yakovenko	Karate	Women's kata team	4 May
Gold	Yelizaveta Topchaniuk	Cycling	Women's time trial	4 May
Gold	Luka Netiaha	Judo	Men's -90 kg	4 May
Gold	Kateryna Shepeliuk	Judo	Women's -63 kg	4 May
Gold	Vladyslav Kremliakov; Rostyslav Yakubovskyi; Illia Sultanov; Oleksii Kolomiiets	Swimming	Men's 4x100 metres medley relay	4 May
Gold	Oleksii Kolomiiets	Swimming	Men's 100 metres breaststroke	5 May
Gold	Violeta Lykova	Shooting	Women's 10 metres air rifle	5 May
Gold	Inna Afonchenko	Shooting	Women's 10 metres air pistol	5 May
Gold	Artem Fandyeyev; Maksym Kulia; Volodymyr Maklakov; Vladyslav Mozyrev; Luka Netiaha; Dmytro Sheretov	Judo	Men's team	5 May
Gold	Kateryna Avdieieva; Valeriia Kolesnikova; Oksana Kravchenko; Maryna Pogorelova; Kateryna Shepeliuk; Anna Shostak	Judo	Women's team	5 May
Gold	Hryhorii Kuzmenko; Maksym Ovcharenko; Anton Veliiev; Gennadii Zakladnyi	Table tennis	Men's team	6 May
Gold	Roksolana Budnyk; Yuliya Khodko; Mariia Vasylieva; Karina Zavinovska	Table tennis	Women's team	6 May
Gold	Yelizaveta Topchaniuk	Cycling	Women's individual road race	6 May
Gold	Nazar Levytskyi	Orienteering	Men's sprint distance	6 May
Gold	Hanna Fedosieieva	Orienteering	Women's sprint distance	6 May
Gold	Dmytro Plakhotnik; Yana Melnyk; Dmytro Levin; Hanna Androsovych	Orienteering	Mixed sprint relay	7 May
Gold	Oleksii Kolomiiets	Swimming	Men's 200 metres breaststroke	7 May
Gold	Hanna Fedosieieva; Nazar Levytskyi	Orienteering	Mixed super sprint relay	8 May
Gold	Inna Afonchenko; Oleksii Lazebnyk	Shooting	Mixed 10 metres air pistol	8 May
Gold	Iryna Tereshchenko	Swimming	Women's 100 metres breaststroke	8 May
Gold	Nataliia Ursulenko	Athletics	Women's shot put	8 May
Gold	Roksolana Budnyk; Maksym Ovcharenko	Table tennis	Mixed doubles	8 May
Gold	Yelizaveta Topchaniuk	Cycling	Women's road points race	8 May
Gold	Ivan Zinenko; Maksym Dudnyk; Vladyslav Adamovych; Artem Karnysh	Swimming	Men's 4x200 metres freestyle relay	8 May
Gold	Inna Afonchenko	Shooting	Women's 25 metres pistol	9 May
Gold	Kristina Kiniaikina	Athletics	Women's 400 metres	9 May
Gold	Yuliya Khodko; Mariia Vasylieva	Table tennis	Women's doubles	9 May
Gold	Dmytro Levin	Orienteering	Men's middle distance	10 May
Gold	Hanna Fedosieieva	Orienteering	Women's middle distance	10 May
Gold	Roman Iashchenko	Wrestling	Men's Greco-Roman 82 kg	10 May
Gold	Rymma Filmoshkina	Athletics	Women's hammer throw	10 May
Gold	Anastasiia Sydorenko	Athletics	Women's 1500 metres	10 May
Gold	Violeta Lykova	Shooting	Women's 50 metres rifle prone	10 May
Gold	Anastasiia Sydorenko	Athletics	Women's 800 metres	12 May
Gold	Hanna Fedosieieva	Orienteering	Women's long distance	12 May
Gold	Oleksandr Sankin	Orienteering	Men's long distance	12 May
Gold	Oleksandr Poltoratskyi; Mykola Tsapkalenko	Beach volleyball	Men's tournament	12 May
Gold	Raisa Rylova; Yuliia Yaroshevska	Beach volleyball	Women's tournament	12 May
Gold	Violeta Lykova	Shooting	Women's 50 metres rifle 3 positions	12 May
Gold	Anatolii Chervonenko	Wrestling	Men's freestyle 86 kg	13 May
Gold	Kristina Kiniaikina; Viktoriia Kochmaryk; Solomiia Kuprysh; Yuliya Shapoval	Athletics	Women's 4x100 metres relay	13 May
Gold	Oleksandr Dmytryyenko; Serhii Drach; Mykola Nosenko; Dmytro Vyshynskyi	Athletics	Men's 4x100 metres relay	13 May
Gold	Ukrainian national men's deaflympic basketball team: Pavlo Bondarenko; Serhii Bukin; Danylo Bychkovyi; Oleksandr Didenko; Ivan Dudar; Oleksandr Fomenko; Oleksandr Levanovych; Andrii Raus; Pavlo Riazantsev; Iurii Stryzhevskyi; Dmytro Vasylenko; Kyrylo Yakovliev	Basketball	Men's tournament	13 May
Gold	Nazar Levytskyi; Ruslan Nikolayenko; Oleksandr Sankin	Orienteering	Men's relay	14 May
Gold	Volodymyr Danylchenko	Athletics	Men's triple jump	14 May
Gold	Anastasiia Sydorenko	Athletics	Women's 800 metres	14 May
Gold	Kristina Kiniaikina; Viktoriia Kochmaryk; Solomiia Kuprysh; Yuliya Shapoval	Athletics	Women's 4x400 metres relay	14 May
Gold	Kristina Kiniaikina; Serhii Drach; Solomiia Kuprysh; Dmytro Rydenko	Athletics	Mixed 4x400 metres relay	14 May
Gold	Ukrainian national men's deaflympic football team: Sergiy Bayev; Dmytro Bielousov; Viacheslav Bragin; Dmytro Dotsenko; Yaroslav Kotliarov; Shalva Mchedlishvili; Bohdan Myshenko; Abdoulie Njie; Oleksandr Olenych; Mykhailo Polianskyi; Viktor Pustovit; Ihor Reutov; Volodymyr Riy; Ivan Rudzevych; Roger Amadou Sene; Roman Stryiskyi; Dmytro Ukrainets; Oleksandr Vereshchaka; Maksym Vodolaha; Kostiantyn Voichenko	Football	Men's tournament	15 May
Silver	Oleksandr Cherniaiev; Oleksandr Kalnyk; Oleksandr Trytiak	Karate	Men's kata team	2 May
Silver	Mykola Pantiushyn	Karate	Kumite +84 kg	2 May
Silver	Iryna Tereshchenko	Swimming	Women's 200 metres breaststroke	4 May
Silver	Viacheslav Novikov	Karate	Kumite -60 kg	3 May
Silver	Volodymyr Maklakov	Judo	Men's -100 kg	4 May
Silver	Maryna Pogorelova	Judo	Women's -70 kg	4 May
Silver	Vladyslav Hrystenko	Swimming	Men's 100 metres breaststroke	5 May
Silver	Anita Makhnyk; Daria Tarasenko; Iryna Tereshchenko	Swimming	Women's 4x200 metres freestyle relay	5 May
Silver	Anita Makhnyk	Swimming	Women's 200 metres butterfly	5 May
Silver	Oleksii Lazebnyk	Shooting	Men's 10 metres air pistol	6 May
Silver	Dmytro Plakhotnik	Orienteering	Men's sprint distance	6 May
Silver	Hanna Androsovych	Orienteering	Women's sprint distance	6 May
Silver	Illia Sultanov; Daria Tarasenko; Oleksii Lytvynenko; Iryna Tereshchenko	Swimming	Mixed 4x100 metres freestyle relay	6 May
Silver	Vladyslav Hrystenko	Swimming	Men's 200 metres breaststroke	7 May
Silver	Valeria Verhyba; Iryna Tereshchenko; Anita Makhnyk; Daria Tarasenko	Swimming	Women's 4x100 metres medley relay	7 May
Silver	Kateryna Potapenko	Athletics	Women's heptathlon	8 May
Silver	Solomiia Kuprysh	Athletics	Women's 400 metres	9 May
Silver	Roksolana Budnyk; Karina Zavinovska	Table tennis	Women's doubles	9 May
Silver	Anton Veliiev; Hryhorii Kuzmenko	Table tennis	Men's doubles	9 May
Silver	Illia Sultanov	Swimming	Men's 50 metres freestyle	9 May
Silver	Daria Tarasenko	Swimming	Women's 50 metres butterfly	9 May
Silver	Vladyslav Kremliakov; Anita Makhnyk; Oleksii Kolomiiets; Iryna Tereshchenko	Swimming	Mixed 4x100 metres medley relay	9 May
Silver	Dmytro Petrenko	Shooting	Men's 50 metres rifle prone	10 May
Silver	Serhii Fomin	Shooting	Men's 25 metres pistol	10 May
Silver	Inna Melnyk	Orienteering	Women's middle distance	10 May
Silver	Oleksandr Sankin	Orienteering	Men's middle distance	10 May
Silver	Yuliya Kysylova	Athletics	Women's hammer throw	10 May
Silver	Yuliya Matviievska	Athletics	Women's long jump	10 May
Silver	Yuliya Shapoval	Athletics	Women's 100 metres hurdles	10 May
Silver	Karina Zavinovska	Table tennis	Women's singles	11 May
Silver	Ruslan Nikolayenko	Orienteering	Men's long distance	12 May
Silver	Dmytryi Renkas; Serhii Tarasov	Beach volleyball	Men's tournament	12 May
Silver	Yuliia Chernenko; Anna Olenych	Beach volleyball	Women's tournament	12 May
Silver	Mykyta Latiuk	Wrestling	Men's freestyle 92 kg	13 May
Silver	Nataliia Ursulenko	Athletics	Women's discus throw	13 May
Silver	Kateryna Potapenko	Athletics	Women's triple jump	13 May
Silver	Ukrainian national men's deaflympic volleyball team: Maksym Donets; Andrii Hrushka; Tychon Kolbasin; Anton Koshkarov; Oleksii Koshkarov; Ivan Kryvobok; Illia Nikiforov; Maksym Osyka; Valerii Radchenko; Vasyl Voloshyn; Ivan Yantso; Volodymyr Zelenskyi	Volleyball	Men's tournament	13 May
Silver	Ruslana Muravska	Athletics	Women's high jump	14 May
Bronze	Iryna Tereshchenko	Swimming	Women's 200 metres individual medley	2 May
Bronze	Iryna Tereshchenko	Swimming	Women's 50 metres breaststroke	3 May
Bronze	Anita Makhnyk	Swimming	Women's 100 metres butterfly	3 May
Bronze	Oleksandr Cherniaiev	Karate	Kumite -75 kg	3 May
Bronze	Marina Hubanova	Karate	Kumite -61 kg	3 May
Bronze	Vladyslav Mozyrev	Judo	Men's -66 kg	3 May
Bronze	Nataliia Nenko	Judo	Women's -48 kg	3 May
Bronze	Kateryna Avdieieva	Judo	Women's -57 kg	3 May
Bronze	Dmytro Sheretov	Judo	Men's -73 kg	3 May
Bronze	Daria Tarasenko; Mariia Rezhylo; Anita Makhnyk; Iryna Tereshchenko	Swimming	Women's 4x100 metres freestyle relay	3 May
Bronze	Yelyzaveta Bondar; Marina Hubanova; Tetiana Khil; Katerina Maslo; Karina Yanchuk; Svitlana Yakovenko	Karate	Women's kumite team	4 May
Bronze	Oksana Kravchenko	Judo	Women's -78 kg	4 May
Bronze	Mariia Bala	Judo	Women's +78 kg	4 May
Bronze	Vladyslav Kremliakov	Swimming	Men's 100 metres backstroke	6 May
Bronze	Dmytro Levin	Orienteering	Men's sprint distance	6 May
Bronze	Yana Melnyk	Orienteering	Women's sprint distance	6 May
Bronze	Anita Makhnyk	Swimming	Women's 400 metres individual medley	7 May
Bronze	Mykola Nosenko	Athletics	Men's 100 metres	8 May
Bronze	Vladyslav Kremliakov	Swimming	Men's 50 metres backstroke	8 May
Bronze	Mariia Levanovych	Taekwondo	Women's 67 kg	8 May
Bronze	Gennadii Zakladnyi; Yuliya Khodko	Table tennis	Mixed doubles	8 May
Bronze	Gennadii Zakladnyi; Maksym Ovcharenko	Table tennis	Men's doubles	9 May
Bronze	Iryna Tereshchenko	Swimming	Women's 50 metres butterfly	9 May
Bronze	Rostyslav Yakubovskyi	Swimming	Men's 200 metres butterfly	9 May
Bronze	Hanna Androsovych	Orienteering	Women's middle distance	10 May
Bronze	Ruslan Nikolayenko	Orienteering	Men's middle distance	10 May
Bronze	Vitalii Butenko	Wrestling	Men's Greco-Roman 60 kg	10 May
Bronze	Andrii Kosov	Wrestling	Men's Greco-Roman 97 kg	10 May
Bronze	Roksolana Budnyk	Table tennis	Women's singles	11 May
Bronze	Sofiia Chernomorova; Bohdana Hubanova	Badminton	Women's doubles	11 May
Bronze	Oleksandr Kostyk	Shooting	Men's 50 metres rifle 3 positions	11 May
Bronze	Serhii Fomin	Shooting	Men's 25 metres rapid fire pistol	12 May
Bronze	Hanna Androsovych	Orienteering	Women's long distance	12 May
Bronze	Serhii Drahan	Wrestling	Men's freestyle 125 kg	13 May
Bronze	Yuliya Matviievska	Athletics	Women's triple jump	13 May
Bronze	Dmytro Vyshynskyi	Athletics	Men's 200 metres	13 May
Bronze	Ukrainian national women's deaflympic volleyball team: Mariya Badyda; Karina Baloh; Anna Bilous; Olena Heriy; Yuliya Kasitska; Emiliya Maleta; Tetiana Mashkovska; Iryna Mosiichyk; Valentyna Osypchuk; Khrystyna Ridosh; Inha Semizenko; Valeriia Sobol	Volleyball	Women's tournament	13 May

Medals by sport
Sport	1st place, gold medalist(s)	2nd place, silver medalist(s)	3rd place, bronze medalist(s)	Total
Athletics	11	8	3	22
Swimming	10	10	9	28
Orientiering	9	5	5	19
Karate	8	3	3	14
Shooting	6	3	2	11
Judo	5	2	6	13
Table tennis	4	3	3	10
Cycling	4	0	0	4
Beach volleyball	2	2	0	4
Wrestling	2	1	3	6
Basketball	1	0	0	1
Football	1	0	0	1
Volleyball	0	1	1	2
Badminton	0	0	1	1
Taekwondo	0	0	1	1
Total	62	38	37	137
