= Buse Tıraş =

Turkish judoka (born 2003)

Personal information
- Nationality: Turkish
- Born: 2003 (age 22–23) Turkey
- Occupation: Judoka
- Weight: 57 kg (126 lb) (2012)

Sport
- Country: Turkey
- Sport: Judo
- Disability class: Deaf
- Event: -57 kg
- Club: Türk Telekom Ankara SK
Medal record
Women's judo
Representing Turkey
Deaflympics
Silver medal – second place	2025 Tokyo	-57 kg
Bronze medal – third place	2025 Tokyo	Team
- Updated on 7 October 2024

Buse Tıraş (born 2003) is a Turkish female judoka who competes in the -57 kg division.

== Sport career ==
Tıraş is a member of Türk Telekom Ankara SK, where she wears the brown belt.

She competed in the -57 kg event at the 2025 Summer Deaflympics in Tokyo, Japan. She won the silver medal after losing the final match in the Golden score extension to defending champion Joana Santos from Portugal. In the team event, she took a bronze medal, with her teammates Elif Gülşen, Esma Gökülü, Bircan Altuntaş, Ayşe Beril Boyacı and Yadigar Talayhan.

== Personal life ==
Buse Tıraş was born in 2003.
