= Nasibeh Shahbazi =

Iranian taekwondo practitioner

Personal information
- Nationality: Iranian
- Born: 16 July 1991 (age 34)

Sport
- Country: Iran
- Sport: Taekwondo
Medal record
Women's taekwondo
Representing Iran
Event / 1st / 2nd / 3rd; Summer Deaflympics / 1 / 0 / 1
Summer Deaflympics
Gold medal – first place	Samsun 2017	67kg
Bronze medal – third place	Caxias do Sul 2021	67kg

Nasibeh Shahbazi also spelt as Noseybeh Shahbazi (born 16 July 1991) is an Iranian deaf taekwondo practitioner. She has represented Iran at the Deaflympics on two occasions in 2017 and 2022.

== Career ==
She made her Deaflympic debut at the 2017 Summer Deaflympics which was held in Turkey. She eventually bagged her first Deaflympic medal during her maiden Deaflympic appearance, when she clinched a gold medal in the women's taekwondo 67kg weight classification event. She defeated her Croatian rival Sara Rajcevic with a scoreline of 10–6 to become the Deaflympic champion in the women's 67 kg weight classification. She was listed as one of the contenders nominated by the International Committee of Sports for the Deaf for the prestigious ICSD Sportswoman of the Year Award in 2017.

She won the gold medal at the 2018 Iranian Women National Taekwondo Championships which was held in Tehran. She received the honour of being one of the contenders nominated by the International Committee of Sports for the Deaf for the ICSD Sportswoman of the Year Award in 2018.

She clinched a bronze medal in the women's 67 kg weight category at the 2021 World Deaf Taekwondo Championships. She took part at the 2021 Summer Deaflympics, which marked her second consecutive appearance at the Deaflympics. During the 2021 Deaflympics, she could not retain her Deaflympic title in the women's taekwondo 67kg weight category as she settled for a bronze medal.
