= Akçin =

Akçin can refer to:

== People ==
- Selinay Akçin (born 2000), Turkish female volleyball player

== Places ==
- Akçin, Ayvacık, a village in the Ayvacık District of Çanakkale Province, Turkey
- Akçin, Dinar, a village in the Dinar District of Afyonkarahisar Province, Turkey
