= Taekwondo at the 2021 Summer Deaflympics =

Deaflympics event

- Venue: UCS Ginásio Poliesportivo
- Location: Brazil, Caxias Do Sul
- Dates: 6–8 May

Taekwondo at the 2021 Summer Deaflympics was held in Caxias Do Sul, Brazil from 6 to 8 May 2022.

== Medal summary ==
* Host nation (Brazil)

Rank	NOC	Gold	Silver	Bronze	Total
1	Iran	4	2	4	10
2	South Korea	4	2	2	8
3	Turkey	1	5	5	11
4	Croatia	1	1	0	2
5	Greece	1	0	1	2
6	Kyrgyzstan	0	1	1	2
7	Kazakhstan	0	0	5	5
8	Uzbekistan	0	0	3	3
9	Ukraine	0	0	1	1
Totals (9 entries)		11	11	22	44

== Medalists ==
=== Kyorugi ===
==== Men ====
Event	Gold	Silver	Bronze
-58 kg	Alireza Sharifimanesh; Iran	Muhammed Bilici; Turkey	Ayan Abdrash; Kazakhstan
-58 kg	Alireza Sharifimanesh; Iran	Muhammed Bilici; Turkey	Ro Woon Lee; South Korea
-68 kg	Pavlos Liotsos; Greece	Ahmet Hakan Tuna; Turkey	Behzad Amiri; Iran
-68 kg	Pavlos Liotsos; Greece	Ahmet Hakan Tuna; Turkey	Nurdaulet Zhakyp; Kazakhstan
-80 kg	Hak Seong Lee; South Korea	Azamat Mavlonov; Kyrgyzstan	Vahid Zeinali; Iran
-80 kg	Hak Seong Lee; South Korea	Azamat Mavlonov; Kyrgyzstan	Yasin Çimen; Turkey
+80 kg	Gwanyong Ha; South Korea	Mohammad Zaferani; Iran	Viktor Frundin; Kazakhstan
+80 kg	Gwanyong Ha; South Korea	Mohammad Zaferani; Iran	Batuhan Şimşek; Turkey

==== Women ====
Event	Gold	Silver	Bronze
-49 kg	Merve Yazıcı; Turkey	Petra Goles; Croatia	Marzieh Khoshahval; Iran
-49 kg	Merve Yazıcı; Turkey	Petra Goles; Croatia	Dilbar Tojiboeva; Uzbekistan
-57 kg	Fatemeh Zahra Zoleikani; Iran	Selma Canlı; Turkey	Guzal Eshmirzaeva; Uzbekistan
-57 kg	Fatemeh Zahra Zoleikani; Iran	Selma Canlı; Turkey	Bermet Marsbekova; Kyrgyzstan
-67 kg	Jin Young Lee; South Korea	Didem Kirazcı; Turkey	Nasibeh Shahbazi; Iran
-67 kg	Jin Young Lee; South Korea	Didem Kirazcı; Turkey	Mariia Levanovych; Ukraine
+67 kg	Matea Kolovrat; Croatia	Selver Şeker; Turkey	Dasom Lee; South Korea
+67 kg	Matea Kolovrat; Croatia	Selver Şeker; Turkey	Mafuna Abdiyusupova; Uzbekistan

=== Poomsae ===
Event	Gold	Silver	Bronze
Men Individual	Minho Choi; South Korea	Morteza Rezasefat; Iran	Yusuf Şiyar Kıran; Turkey
Men Individual	Minho Choi; South Korea	Morteza Rezasefat; Iran	Olzhas Ryszhanov; Kazakhstan
Women Individual	Maryam Khodabandeh; Iran	Siwon Jeon; South Korea	Türkan Teke; Turkey
Women Individual	Maryam Khodabandeh; Iran	Siwon Jeon; South Korea	Eirini Machairidou; Greece
Pair	Iran; Morteza Rezasefat; Maryam Khodabandeh	South Korea; Minho Choi; Siwon Jeon	Turkey; Yusuf Şiyar Kıran; Türkan Teke
Pair	Iran; Morteza Rezasefat; Maryam Khodabandeh	South Korea; Minho Choi; Siwon Jeon	Kazakhstan; Olzhas Ryszhanov; Aizhamol Abdikatova
