= Serah Wangari =

Kenyan long-distance runner

Personal information
- Full name: Serah Kimani Wangari
- Born: 1972 (age 53–54)

Sport
- Country: Kenya
Medal record
Women's athletics
Representing Kenya
Deaflympics
Silver medal – second place	Caxias do Sul 2021	10000m

Serah Kimani Wangari (born 1972), known as Serah Wangari or Serah Kimani, is a Kenyan track and field athlete who has specialized in long-distance running.

== Career ==
She made her Deaflympic debut representing Kenya during the 2013 Summer Deaflympics and competed in the women's 5000m and women's 10000m running events. She reached finals of the women's 10000m race in 2013 Deaflympics and ended up at fifth position.

She made her second Deaflympic appearance after a gap of nine years at the age of 50 during the 2021 Summer Deaflympics (held in May 2022) and claimed her first Deaflympic medal during the course of the multi-sport event in the women's 10000m event. She was initially on the cusp of winning the gold in 10000m event but lost the lead with just two laps to go as she became exhausted in the latter part of the race and she would later blame the cold weather conditions which she consider as the reason on why her knees were weakened. She settled for a silver medal while Mexico's Lourdes Ponce Juarez claimed gold medal in the event. Coincidentally, her fellow Kenyan compatriot Grancy Kandagor claimed bronze medal in the same competition. The medal achievements of both Wangari and Grancy is also the first time that Kenya had secured a medal in the 10000m race at a Deaflympic event. The medals were also the first set of medals won by Kenya at the 2021 Summer Deaflympics.
