= Ukraine at the 1993 Summer Deaflympics =

- IOC code: UKR
- NOC: Ukraine Deaf Sports Federation
- Website: deafsport.org.ua (in Ukrainian)

in Sofia, Bulgaria 24 July 1993 – 2 August 1993
- Competitors: 41 in 5 sports
- Medals Ranked 14th: Gold 2 Silver 4 Bronze 2 Total 8

Summer Deaflympics appearances
- 1924; 1928; 1931; 1935; 1939; 1949; 1953; 1957; 1961; 1965; 1969; 1973; 1977; 1981; 1985; 1989; 1993; 1997; 2001; 2005; 2009; 2013; 2017; 2021

Ukraine competed at the 1993 Summer Deaflympics in Sofia from 24 July to 2 August 1993. It was the nation's first consecutive appearance at the Summer Deaflympics in the post-Soviet era after the disintegration of the Soviet Union.

== Medalists ==
Medal	Name	Sport	Event
Gold	Svitlana Horodok	Athletics	Women's 200 metres
Gold	Svitlana Horodok	Athletics	Women's 400 metres
Silver	Svitlana Horodok; Iryna Kuznetsova; Tetiana Yakimchuk; Inna Zverynska	Athletics	Women's 4x100 metres relay
Silver	Svitlana Horodok; Iryna Kuznetsova; Tetiana Yakimchuk; Inna Zverynska	Athletics	Women's 4x400 metres relay
Silver	Ganna Lytvynenko	Swimming	Women's 50 metres freestyle
Silver	Mykola Zakladnyi	Table tennis	Men's singles
Bronze	Georgiy Koiev	Wrestling	Men's freestyle 48-52 kg
Bronze	Ukrainian national women's deaflympic volleyball team: Tamara Belenkova; Olena Evstratova; Halyna Nemialkovska; Natalia Nikolaieva; Larysa Sinchuk; Lilia Tiaka	Volleyball	Women's tournament
