= Wrestling at the 2021 Summer Deaflympics =

Deaflympics event

- Host city: Brazil, Caxias Do Sul
- Dates: 10–14 May 2022
- Stadium: UCS Ginásio Poliesportivo

Champions
- Freestyle: Turkey
- Greco-Roman: Iran

Wrestling at the 2021 Summer Deaflympics was held in Caxias Do Sul, Brazil from 10 to 14 May 2022.

== Medal summary ==
Rank	NOC	Gold	Silver	Bronze	Total
1	Iran	5	4	4	13
2	Turkey	4	5	3	12
3	Kazakhstan	2	4	3	9
4	Ukraine	2	1	3	6
5	India	1	0	2	3
6	Lithuania	1	0	0	1
6	Mongolia	1	0	0	1
8	Kyrgyzstan	0	1	2	3
9	Bulgaria	0	1	0	1
10	Armenia	0	0	4	4
11	Greece	0	0	2	2
11	United States	0	0	2	2
13	Portugal	0	0	1	1
Totals (13 entries)		16	16	26	58

=== Team ranking ===
Rank	Freestyle		Greco-Roman	
Rank	Team	Points	Team	Points
1	Turkey	144	Iran	153
2	Kazakhstan	132	Turkey	145
3	Iran	130	Kazakhstan	110
4	Ukraine	76	Ukraine	73
5	India	74	United States	64
6	United States	65	Armenia	63
7	Mongolia	45	India	58
8	Armenia	42	Bulgaria	40
9	Kyrgyzstan	20	Kyrgyzstan	34
10	Venezuela	10	Greece	30

== Medalists ==
=== Men's freestyle ===
Event	Gold	Silver	Bronze
57 kg	Mohammad Siavoshi; Iran	Gabit Yeszhanov; Kazakhstan	Kürşat Kiraz; Turkey
57 kg	Mohammad Siavoshi; Iran	Gabit Yeszhanov; Kazakhstan	Senik Serobyan; Armenia
65 kg	Erkhembayar Namdagdorj; Mongolia	Almazbek Isakov; Kyrgyzstan	Keivan Rostamabadi; Iran
65 kg	Erkhembayar Namdagdorj; Mongolia	Almazbek Isakov; Kyrgyzstan	Sinan Sadak; Turkey
70 kg	Onur Arı; Turkey	Sabyrzhan Rsaly; Kazakhstan	Foroud Hojjati; Iran
74 kg	Oğuz Dönder; Turkey	Gassyr Turgynbay; Kazakhstan	Virender Singh; India
74 kg	Oğuz Dönder; Turkey	Gassyr Turgynbay; Kazakhstan	Hossein Nouri; Iran
86 kg	Anatolii Chervonenko; Ukraine	Hamid Reza Kanaanizadeh; Iran	Amit Krishan; India
92 kg	Ömer Saner; Turkey	Mykyta Latiuk; Ukraine	Bexultan Malaidar; Kazakhstan
97 kg	Sumit Dahiya; India	Mohammad Ghamarpour; Iran	Lütfullah Mustafa Kılıç; Turkey
125 kg	Khairatkhaan Shonku; Kazakhstan	Ali Shakibazadeh; Iran	Serhii Drahan; Ukraine

=== Men's Greco-Roman ===
Event	Gold	Silver	Bronze
55 kg	Sadegh Abolvafaei; Iran	Panayot Dimitrov; Bulgaria	Smadiiar Zhumakadyrov; Kyrgyzstan
55 kg	Sadegh Abolvafaei; Iran	Panayot Dimitrov; Bulgaria	Sargis Sargsyan; Armenia
60 kg	Mehdi Bakhshi; Iran	Kürşat Kiraz; Turkey	Vitalii Butenko; Ukraine
60 kg	Mehdi Bakhshi; Iran	Kürşat Kiraz; Turkey	Aldiyar Baltashev; Kazakhstan
67 kg	Mehmet Ali Yiğit; Turkey	Ali Karimi; Iran	Zhora Grigoryan; Armenia
67 kg	Mehmet Ali Yiğit; Turkey	Ali Karimi; Iran	Hugo Passos; Portugal
77 kg	Mantas Sinkevičius; Lithuania	Muhammet Akdeniz; Turkey	Nurzhan Assan; Kazakhstan
77 kg	Mantas Sinkevičius; Lithuania	Muhammet Akdeniz; Turkey	Nikolaos Iosifidis; Greece
82 kg	Roman Iashchenko; Ukraine	Bayram Aksu; Turkey	Shirzad Mahaki; Iran
87 kg	Abouzar Rabiezadeh; Iran	Ahmet Talha Kacur; Turkey	Narek Nikoghosyan; Armenia
87 kg	Abouzar Rabiezadeh; Iran	Ahmet Talha Kacur; Turkey	Ashten Gene Johnson; United States
97 kg	Akbar Saberi; Iran	Assylzhan Tazhiyev; Kazakhstan	Amaree McKenstry; United States
97 kg	Akbar Saberi; Iran	Assylzhan Tazhiyev; Kazakhstan	Andrii Kosov; Ukraine
130 kg	Khairatkhaan Shonku; Kazakhstan	Mehmet Uysal; Turkey	Milias Markov; Kyrgyzstan
130 kg	Khairatkhaan Shonku; Kazakhstan	Mehmet Uysal; Turkey	Alexandros Papadatos; Greece

== Participating nations ==
128 wrestlers from 19 countries:

1. Algeria (1)
2. Armenia (10)
3. Azerbaijan (2)
4. Bulgaria (6)
5. Cameroon (1)
6. Cuba (6)
7. Greece (4)
8. India (13)
9. Iran (16)
10. Kazakhstan (16)
11. Kyrgyzstan (4)
12. Lithuania (1)
13. Moldova (1)
14. Mongolia (3)
15. Portugal (1)
16. Turkey (16)
17. Ukraine (10)
18. United States (14)
19. Venezuela (3)

Belarusian and Russian wrestlers did not compete at the event after a ban as a result of the Russian invasion of Ukraine.
