= Malaysia at the 2017 Summer Deaflympics =

- IOC code: MAS
- National federation: Malaysian Deaf Sports Association
- Website: www.msdeaf.org.my

in Samsun 18 – 30 July 2017
- Competitors: 16
- Medals Ranked 39th: Gold 0 Silver 1 Bronze 0 Total 1

Summer Deaflympics appearances (overview)
- 1993; 1997; 2001; 2005; 2009; 2013; 2017; 2021

Malaysia competed in the 2017 Summer Deaflympics which was held in Samsun, Turkey after narrowly missing the opportunity to compete at the 2013 Summer Deaflympics due to the Malaysian players' allegation for not having enough practices to compete at the event. Malaysia sent a delegation consisting of 16 participants for the event though it was earlier announced that only 10 competitors would take part in the multi-sport event. This was only the fifth time that Malaysia was eligible participate at the Summer Deaflympics after making its Deaflympic debut in 1993.

Prior to the Deaflympic event, the Malaysian government announced that the medal winners would be rewarded. Malaysia claimed its only medal in the badminton mixed doubles event.

== Medalists ==
Medal	Name	Sport	Event	Date
Silver	Boon Wei Ying; Francis Tan Heng Bock	Badminton	Mixed doubles	28 July

== Medal table ==
Sport	Gold	Silver	Bronze	Total
Badminton	0	1	0	1

== See also ==
- Malaysia at the Deaflympics
