= Badminton at the 2021 Summer Deaflympics =

- Venue: CIE Sports Hall
- Location: Brazil, Caxias Do Sul
- Dates: 2–11 May

Badminton at the 2021 Summer Deaflympics was held in Caxias Do Sul, Brazil from 2 to 11 May 2022.

== Medal summary ==
* Host nation (Brazil)

Rank	NOC	Gold	Silver	Bronze	Total
1	India (IND)	3	0	1	4
2	South Korea (KOR)	2	1	0	3
3	Malaysia (MAS)	1	1	1	3
4	Chinese Taipei (TPE)	0	1	2	3
5	Austria (AUT)	0	1	0	1
5	Japan (JPN)	0	1	0	1
5	Lithuania (LTU)	0	1	0	1
8	Thailand (THA)	0	0	1	1
8	Ukraine (UKR)	0	0	1	1
Totals (9 entries)		6	6	6	18

== Medalists ==
Event	Gold	Silver	Bronze
Men's singles	Woo Jisoo; South Korea	Seo Myeongsoo; South Korea	Abhinav Sharma; India
Men's doubles	South Korea; Seo Myeongsoo , Woo Jisoo	Lithuania; Kazimieras Dauskurtas, Ignas Reznikas	Thailand; Siriwat Mattayanumat, Ittikon Punyangam
Women's singles	Jerlin Jayaratchagan; India	Katrin Neudolt; Austria	Boon Wei Ying; Malaysia
Women's doubles	Malaysia; Boon Wei Ying, Foo Zu Tung	Chinese Taipei; Jung-Yu Fan, Yan-Ru Shen	Ukraine; Sofiia Chernomorova, Bohdana Hubanova
Mixed doubles	India; Abhinav Sharma, Jerlin Jayaratchagan	Malaysia; Edmund Teo Seng Keong, Boon Wei Ying	Chinese Taipei; Chung-I Chen, Jung-Yu Fan
Mixed team	India (IND); Rohit Bhaker, Mahesh	Japan (JPN)	Chinese Taipei (TPE)
