= Badminton at the 2025 Summer Deaflympics =

- Venue: Keio Arena Tokyo, Japan
- Dates: 16–25 November 2025

Badminton at the 2025 Summer Deaflympics was held at the Keio Arena Tokyo in Tokyo, Japan from 16 to 25 November 2025.

Six medal events were held, consists of two men's events, two women's events and two mixed events.

== Medal table ==
* Host nation (Japan)

Rank	NOC	Gold	Silver	Bronze	Total
1	Individual Neutral Athletes	3	1	0	4
2	Japan*	2	1	0	3
3	South Korea	1	1	1	3
4	China	0	2	0	2
5	Chinese Taipei	0	1	1	2
6	Austria	0	0	1	1
6	Hong Kong	0	0	1	1
6	Malaysia	0	0	1	1
6	Thailand	0	0	1	1
Totals (9 entries)		6	6	6	18

== Medalists ==
Event	Gold	Silver	Bronze
Men's singles	Shokhzod Gulomzoda; Individual Neutral Athletes	Mikhail Efremov; Individual Neutral Athletes	Lau Chun Hei; Hong Kong
Men's doubles	Individual Neutral Athletes; Shokhzod Gulomzoda; Mikhail Efremov	Japan; Yuki Morimoto; Yasuhiro Nagaishi	Thailand; Mattaya Numat Siriwat; Punyangam Ittikorn
Women's singles	Park Min-kyeong; South Korea	Shen Yan-Ru; Chinese Taipei	Katrin Neudolt; Austria
Women's doubles	Japan; Ayaka Yakabe; Mai Yakabe	China; Jiang Jialei; Zhang Hengyan	South Korea; Lee So-yeong; Park Min-kyeong
Mixed doubles	Individual Neutral Athletes; Shokhzod Gulomzoda; Elena Tiurina	South Korea; Shin Kyung-duk; Park Min-kyeong	Malaysia; Edmund Teo; Boon Wei Ying
Mixed team	Japan; Yuki Morimoto; Ayumu Ohta; Mai Yakabe; Ayaka Yakabe; Yume Katayama	China; Feng Guozhong; Ding Yibo; Wen Yaodong; Jiang Jialei; Zhang Hengyan; Du Yueting	Chinese Taipei; Cheng Chung-I; Cheng Chen-Ding; Liu Hao-En; Fan Jung-Yu; Shen Yan-Ru
