= Kezban Çağla Ateş =

Turkish volleyball player (born 1988)

Personal information
- Nationality: Turkish
- Born: 1988 (age 37–38); Ankara, Turkey
Honours
Representing Turkey
Women's volleyball
Deaflympics
Gold medal – first place	2021 Caxias do Sul	Team

Kezban Çağla Ateş (born 1988), also known as Çağla Ateş, is a Turkish female volleyball player who has also played beach volleyball. She was a member of the Turkey national teams of women's deaf volleyball and deaf beach volleyball teams.

== Club career ==
Ateş was part of the Ankara Deaf Sports Club. In 2016, she became runners-up with her team at the Turkish Deaf Volleyball Championships in Afyonkarahisar.

== International career ==
Ateş was a member of the Turkey women's national deaf volleyball team.

She and her teammate Gülay Aslan were eliminated at the 2012 World Beach Volleyball Championships held in Antalya, Turkey. She took part in the Beach Volleyball Championship at the 2013 Sofia Deaflympics in Bulgaria. She and her teammate Yeter Yalçın ranked last at eight place. In 2015, she played at the 9th European Deaf Volleyball Championships in Paris, France, where she placed fourth with her r-team after losing to Ukraine in the semifinals. At the 2017 Samsun Deaflympics in Turkey, she placed seventh with her team defeating Brazil. With her team, she captured the gold medal at the 2021 Caxias do Sul Deaflympics in Brazil, which took place in 2022.

== Personal life ==
Kezban Çağla Ateş was born in 1988.*
