= Table tennis at the 2021 Summer Deaflympics =

Deaflympics event

- Venue: Parque cinquentenário (Farroupilha City Stadium)
- Location: Brazil, Caxias Do Sul
- Dates: 7–11 May

Table tennis at the 2021 Summer Deaflympics was held in Caxias Do Sul, Brazil from 5 to 10 May 2022.

== Medal summary ==
Rank	NOC	Gold	Silver	Bronze	Total
1	Ukraine (UKR)	2	3	3	8
2	Slovakia (SVK)	2	0	1	3
3	South Korea (KOR)	1	2	3	6
4	Austria (AUT)	0	0	1	1
4	Chinese Taipei (TPE)	0	0	1	1
4	Japan (JPN)	0	0	1	1
Totals (6 entries)		5	5	10	20

== Medalists ==
Event	Gold	Silver	Bronze
Men's singles	Thomas Keinath; Slovakia	Lee Chang-joon; South Korea	Wang Yi-Hsiang; Chinese Taipei
Men's singles	Thomas Keinath; Slovakia	Lee Chang-joon; South Korea	Christopher Kramer; Austria
Men's doubles	South Korea (KOR); Seuk Oh; Lee Chang-joon	Ukraine (UKR); Grygorii Kuzmenko; Anton Veliev	Ukraine (UKR); Maksim Ovcharenko; Gennadii Zakladnyi
Men's doubles	South Korea (KOR); Seuk Oh; Lee Chang-joon	Ukraine (UKR); Grygorii Kuzmenko; Anton Veliev	South Korea (KOR); Shin Cheol-jin; Kim Jong-kook
Women's singles	Eva Jurková; Slovakia	Karyna Zavinovska; Ukraine	Roksolana Budnyk; Ukraine
Women's singles	Eva Jurková; Slovakia	Karyna Zavinovska; Ukraine	Yunsol Mo; South Korea
Women's doubles	Ukraine (UKR); Julia Khodko; Mariia Vasylieva	Ukraine (UKR); Roksolana Budnyk; Karina Zavinovska	South Korea (KOR); Jiyeun Lee; Yunja Mo
Women's doubles	Ukraine (UKR); Julia Khodko; Mariia Vasylieva	Ukraine (UKR); Roksolana Budnyk; Karina Zavinovska	Japan (JPN); Riho Kamezawa; Mizue Kawasaki
Mixed doubles	Ukraine (UKR); Maksim Ovcharenko; Roksolana Budnyk	South Korea (KOR); Lee Chang-joon; Yunja Mo	Ukraine (UKR); Gennadii Zakladnyi; Julia Khodko
Mixed doubles	Ukraine (UKR); Maksim Ovcharenko; Roksolana Budnyk	South Korea (KOR); Lee Chang-joon; Yunja Mo	Slovakia (SVK); Thomas Keinath; Eva Jurková
Men's team			
Women's team			South Korea (KOR)
