= Dominican Republic at the 2021 Summer Deaflympics =

- IOC code: DOM
- National federation: Dominican Republic Olympic Committee
- Website: colimdo.org

in Caxias do Sul 1 – 15 May 2022
- Competitors: 3 (3 men and 0 women) in 1 sport
- Officials: 1
- Medals Ranked 31st: Gold 1 Silver 1 Bronze 0 Total 2

Summer Deaflympics appearances
- 1924; 1928; 1931; 1935; 1939; 1949; 1953; 1957; 1961; 1965; 1969; 1973; 1977; 1981; 1985; 1989; 1993; 1997; 2001; 2005; 2009; 2013; 2017; 2021

The Dominican Republic competed at the 2021 Summer Deaflympics in Caxias do Sul from 1 to 15 May 2022. The National delegation included three track and field athletes and lead by Alan Jesurum, chief of mission.

== Medalists ==
Medal	Name	Sport	Event	Date
Gold	Christopher Melenciano	Athletics	Men's 200 m	13 May
Silver	Christopher Melenciano	Athletics	Men's 400 m	9 May

== Athletics ==
- Christopher Melenciano
- Xavier Ogando
- Nazari Caraballo
