= Badminton at the 2017 Summer Deaflympics =

Deaflympics event

- Venue: Bafra Sports Hall
- Location: Turkey, Samsun
- Dates: 19–28 July

Badminton at the 2017 Summer Deaflympics took place at the Bafra Sports Hall.

== Medal summary ==
* Host nation (Turkey)

Rank	NOC	Gold	Silver	Bronze	Total
1	China (CHN)	4	0	1	5
2	Russia (RUS)	1	2	2	5
3	Thailand (THA)	1	0	0	1
4	South Korea (KOR)	0	2	1	3
5	Chinese Taipei (TPE)	0	1	1	2
6	Malaysia (MAS)	0	1	0	1
7	Japan (JPN)	0	0	1	1
Totals (7 entries)		6	6	6	18

== Medalists ==
Event	Gold	Silver	Bronze
Men's singles	Tang Kaifeng; China	Artemy Mikhailovich Karpov; Russia	Shokhzod Khudodagi Gulomzoda; Russia
Men's doubles	Thailand; Siriwat Mattayanumat, Ittikorn Punyangam	South Korea; Shin Hyunwoo, Seo Myeongsoo	Russia; Valery Valeryevich Antonov, Mikhail Yefremov
Women's singles	Wang Meng; China	Jeong Seonhwa; South Korea	Manami Nagahara; Japan
Women's doubles	China; Zhang Heng Yan; Wang Meng	Chinese Taipei; Jung-Yu Fan; Yan-Ru Shen	South Korea; Jeong Seonhwa; Lee Soyeong
Mixed doubles	Russia; Artemy Mikhailovich Karpov, Alena Igorevna Soboleva	Malaysia; Boon Wei Ying, Francis Tan Heng Bock	China; Ding Yibo, Zhang Heng Yan
Mixed team	China; Ding Yibo, Lu Guangyao, Tang Kaifeng, Wang Meng, Wang Meng Xing, Zhang Heng Yan	Russia; Valery Valeryevich Antonov, Olga Dormidontova, Mikhail Efremov, Shokhzod Khudodagi Gulomzoda, Artemy Mikhailovich Karpov, Karina Khakimova, Olga Andreevna Shtayger, Alena Igorevna Soboleva	Chinese Taipei; Chen Chung-I, Fan Jung-Yu, Hsieh Li-Chi, Huang Chen-Che, Huang Cheng-I, Shen Yan-Ru, Tu Wen-Hsuan, Yin Shih-Rong

== Results ==
=== Mixed team ===
==== Group A ====
Pos	Team	Pld	W	L	Pts	Qualification
1	China	2	2	0	2	Quarter-finals
2	Russia	2	1	1	1	Quarter-finals
3	Bulgaria	2	0	2	0	

==== Group B ====
Pos	Team	Pld	W	L	Pts	Qualification
1	South Korea	2	2	0	2	Quarter-finals
2	Ukraine	2	1	1	1	Quarter-finals
3	Brazil	2	0	2	0	

==== Group C ====
Pos	Team	Pld	W	L	Pts	Qualification
1	India	2	2	0	2	Quarter-finals
2	Turkey	2	1	1	1	Quarter-finals
3	Indonesia	2	0	2	0	

==== Group D ====
Pos	Team	Pld	W	L	Pts	Qualification
1	Chinese Taipei	2	2	0	2	Quarter-finals
2	Japan	2	1	1	1	Quarter-finals
3	Hong Kong	2	0	2	0	

==== Knockout ====
Quarterfinals
20 July
China	3
Turkey	0
20 July
Chinese Taipei	3
Ukraine	1
20 July
Russia	3
India	0
20 July
Japan	0
South Korea	3

Semifinals
21 July
China	3
Chinese Taipei	1
21 July
Russia	3
South Korea	1

Gold medal
21 July
China	3
Russia	2
Bronze medal
21 July
Chinese Taipei	3
South Korea	2
