= Karate at the 2021 Summer Deaflympics =

Deaflympics event

- Venue: Ginásio 1 - UCS
- Location: Brazil, Caxias Do Sul
- Dates: 2–4 May

Karate at the 2021 Summer Deaflympics in Brazil.

== Medal summary ==
Rank	NOC	Gold	Silver	Bronze	Total
1	Ukraine (UKR)	8	3	3	14
2	Iran (IRI)	2	3	5	10
3	Venezuela (VEN)	2	1	8	11
4	Japan (JPN)	2	0	3	5
5	Turkey (TUR)	1	5	5	11
6	Algeria (ALG)	1	1	1	3
7	Italy (ITA)	0	2	1	3
8	Malaysia (MAS)	0	1	0	1
9	Bulgaria (BUL)	0	0	1	1
9	Chinese Taipei (TPE)	0	0	1	1
9	Czech Republic (CZE)	0	0	1	1
9	Greece (GRE)	0	0	1	1
9	Israel (ISR)	0	0	1	1
Totals (13 entries)		16	16	31	63

== Medalists ==
=== Men ===
Event	Gold	Silver	Bronze
Men Kata	Oleksandr Cherniaiev; Ukraine	Sabri Kıroğlu; Turkey	Kenji Mori; Japan
Men Kata	Oleksandr Cherniaiev; Ukraine	Sabri Kıroğlu; Turkey	Hinata Kitamura; Japan
Men Kata Team	Turkey (TUR); Burak Mert Can; Sabri Kıroğlu; Fatih Çiçek	Ukraine (UKR)	Chinese Taipei (TPE)
Men Kata Team	Turkey (TUR); Burak Mert Can; Sabri Kıroğlu; Fatih Çiçek	Ukraine (UKR)	Venezuela (VEN)
Men Kumite -60 kg	Milad Sadeghzadeh; Iran	Viacheslav Novikov; Ukraine	Ramon Alejandro Garcia; Venezuela
Men Kumite -60 kg	Milad Sadeghzadeh; Iran	Viacheslav Novikov; Ukraine	Giuseppe Alibrandi; Italy
Men Kumite -67 kg	Yurii Haiduchenko; Ukraine	Mohammed Larbi; Algeria	Burak Mert Can; Turkey
Men Kumite -67 kg	Yurii Haiduchenko; Ukraine	Mohammed Larbi; Algeria	Ismael David Rodrigues; Venezuela
Men Kumite -75 kg	Youssef Hassani; Algeria	Josue Abraham Lopez; Venezuela	Nikolay Hristov; Bulgaria
Men Kumite -75 kg	Youssef Hassani; Algeria	Josue Abraham Lopez; Venezuela	Oleksandr Cherniaiev; Ukraine
Men Kumite -84 kg	Oleksandr Makhno; Ukraine	Yilamaran Vispalinggam; Malaysia	Osman Emre Kula; Turkey
Men Kumite -84 kg	Oleksandr Makhno; Ukraine	Yilamaran Vispalinggam; Malaysia	Avi Bokler; Israel
Men Kumite +84 kg	Alexander Vargas Hernandez; Venezuela	Mykola Pantiushyn; Ukraine	Hadj Kerrah; Algeria
Men Kumite +84 kg	Alexander Vargas Hernandez; Venezuela	Mykola Pantiushyn; Ukraine	Hossein Tabarteh; Iran
Men Kumite Team	Ukraine (UKR); Viacheslav Novikov; Oleksandr Makhno; Volodymyr Makhno; Oleksandr Cherniaiev; Yurii Haiduchenko; Mykola Pantiushyn; Yevhenii Neporad	Turkey (TUR); Burak Mert Can; Emirhan Gürsoy; Fatih Çiçek; Mehmet Şahin; Osman Emre Kula; Şükrü Dündar; Volkan Kardeşler	Iran (IRI); Milad Sadeghzadeh; Hossein Tabarteh; Kamran Rezaeinejad; Ebrahim Pourkashani; Alireza Kishani
Men Kumite Team	Ukraine (UKR); Viacheslav Novikov; Oleksandr Makhno; Volodymyr Makhno; Oleksandr Cherniaiev; Yurii Haiduchenko; Mykola Pantiushyn; Yevhenii Neporad	Turkey (TUR); Burak Mert Can; Emirhan Gürsoy; Fatih Çiçek; Mehmet Şahin; Osman Emre Kula; Şükrü Dündar; Volkan Kardeşler	Venezuela (VEN); Vargas Hernandez; Alexander Alfonso; Alejandro Garcia Ramon; Josue Abraham Lopez; Ismael David Rodrigues; Andi Sumoza; Parra Bolaño; Ronald Jhosue; Miguel David Diaz

=== Women ===
Event	Gold	Silver	Bronze
Women Kata	Ryo Ogura; Japan	Greta Ampollini; Italy	Mojdeh Mardani; Iran
Women Kata	Ryo Ogura; Japan	Greta Ampollini; Italy	Barbora Vachoutová; Czech Republic
Women Kata Team	Ukraine (UKR); Tetiana Khil; Inessa Prychyna; Svitlana Yakovenko	Iran (IRI); Nahid Amiri; Samaneh Borji; Parvin Yareh	Turkey (TUR); Melek Morgil; Sinem Özkan; Kader Işık Afşar
Women Kata Team	Ukraine (UKR); Tetiana Khil; Inessa Prychyna; Svitlana Yakovenko	Iran (IRI); Nahid Amiri; Samaneh Borji; Parvin Yareh	Venezuela (VEN); Bilmary Justo; Johanna Ramos Argedis; Ana Esther Rivera
Women Kumite -50 kg	Marina Hubanova; Ukraine	Melek Morgil; Turkey	Everick Nahomy Lopez; Venezuela
Women Kumite -50 kg	Marina Hubanova; Ukraine	Melek Morgil; Turkey	Hakimeh Zakizadeh; Iran
Women Kumite -55 kg	Katerina Maslo; Ukraine	Zeinab Hassanpour; Iran	Johanna Ramos Argedis; Venezuela
Women Kumite -55 kg	Katerina Maslo; Ukraine	Zeinab Hassanpour; Iran	Yuzawa Aoi; Japan
Women Kumite -61 kg	Ryo Ogura; Japan	Sinem Özkan; Turkey	Sofia Moutsokou; Greece
Women Kumite -61 kg	Ryo Ogura; Japan	Sinem Özkan; Turkey	Yelyzaveta Bondar; Ukraine
Women Kumite -68 kg	Karina Yanchuk; Ukraine	Irene Sbrissa; Italy	Melek Özkaya; Turkey
Women Kumite -68 kg	Karina Yanchuk; Ukraine	Irene Sbrissa; Italy	Sara Adria; Iran
Women Kumite +68 kg	Bilmary Justo; Venezuela	Bita Javaheri; Iran	Zeynep Erdoğan; Turkey
Women Kumite Team	Iran (IRI); Sara Adria; Zeinab Hassanpour; Mahnaz Hassanzadeh; Hakimeh Zakizadeh; Bita Javaheri	Turkey (TUR); Kader Işık Afşar; Melek Morgil; Sinem Özkan; Melek Özkaya	Venezuela (VEN); Alejandra Phillips; Johanna Ramos Argedis; Ana Esther Rivera; Liz Yeraldine Cabeza; Bilmary Justo
Women Kumite Team	Iran (IRI); Sara Adria; Zeinab Hassanpour; Mahnaz Hassanzadeh; Hakimeh Zakizadeh; Bita Javaheri	Turkey (TUR); Kader Işık Afşar; Melek Morgil; Sinem Özkan; Melek Özkaya	Ukraine (UKR); Yelyzaveta Bondar; Marina Hubanova; Tetiana Khil; Katerina Maslo; Karina Yanchuk; Svitlana Yakovenko

== See also ==
- Karate at the 2017 Summer Deaflympics
