= Bowling at the 2025 Summer Deaflympics =

- Venue: Higashiyamato Grandbowl, Japan
- Dates: 17–25 November 2025

Bowling at the 2025 Summer Deaflympics was held at the Higashiyamato Grandbowl in Tokyo, Japan from 17 to 25 November 2025.

7 medal events were held, consists of three men's events, three women's events and one mixed event.

== Medal table ==
* Host nation (Japan)

Rank	NOC	Gold	Silver	Bronze	Total
1	South Korea	3	2	4	9
2	Germany	2	1	3	6
3	Chinese Taipei	1	1	3	5
4	Malaysia	1	1	0	2
5	Ukraine	0	2	2	4
6	Belgium	0	0	1	1
6	Poland	0	0	1	1
Totals (7 entries)		7	7	14	28

== Medalists ==
Event	Gold	Silver	Bronze
Men's singles	Matthew Forsyth; Germany	Bak Jae-ung; South Korea	Daniel Duda; Germany
Men's singles	Matthew Forsyth; Germany	Bak Jae-ung; South Korea	Park Ji-hong; South Korea
Men's doubles	Malaysia; Syabil Azam Syamsul Azam; Ho Choon Seong	Ukraine; Vadym Danyliuk; Vladislav Ialovega	Belgium; Thomas Bartholome; Christophe Bartholome
Men's doubles	Malaysia; Syabil Azam Syamsul Azam; Ho Choon Seong	Ukraine; Vadym Danyliuk; Vladislav Ialovega	South Korea; Bak Jae-ung; Kim Ji-su
Men's team	Germany; Matthew Forsyth; Simon Wildenhayn; Kevin Lindemann; Daniel Duda	South Korea; Bak Jae-ung; Kim Ji-su; Park Ji-hong; Choi Hong-chang	Chinese Taipei; Chen Chien-Hao; Hsieh Sheng-Fu; Lu Tai-An; Tsai Lin-Hsin
Men's team	Germany; Matthew Forsyth; Simon Wildenhayn; Kevin Lindemann; Daniel Duda	South Korea; Bak Jae-ung; Kim Ji-su; Park Ji-hong; Choi Hong-chang	Poland; Tomasz Zarek; Grzegorz Szczesny; Michal Pawel Pick; Pawel Szymczak
Women's singles	An Hyoung-sook; South Korea	Anzhelika Zhukova; Ukraine	Lin Ya-Chin; Chinese Taipei
Women's singles	An Hyoung-sook; South Korea	Anzhelika Zhukova; Ukraine	Chen I-Miao; Chinese Taipei
Women's doubles	South Korea; Lee Chan-mi; Heo Seon-sil	Malaysia; Huwainaa Danduan Abdullah; Misha Nathera Mackery	Germany; Tina Linz; Thalia Hoenig
Women's doubles	South Korea; Lee Chan-mi; Heo Seon-sil	Malaysia; Huwainaa Danduan Abdullah; Misha Nathera Mackery	South Korea; Park Sun-ok; An Hyoung-sook
Women's team	Chinese Taipei; Chang Yao-Chien; Chen I-Miao; Lin Ya-Chin; Wang Yu-Chin	South Korea; Lee Chan-mi; Heo Seon-sil; Park Sun-ok; An Hyoung-sook	Ukraine; Alla Diachenko; Kateryna Kovalchuk; Viktoriia Semizenko; Anzhelika Zhukova
Women's team	Chinese Taipei; Chang Yao-Chien; Chen I-Miao; Lin Ya-Chin; Wang Yu-Chin	South Korea; Lee Chan-mi; Heo Seon-sil; Park Sun-ok; An Hyoung-sook	Germany; Tina Linz; Thalia Hoenig; Sabrina Forsyth; Melanie Klinke
Mixed team	South Korea; Park Ji-hong; Choi Hong-chang; Park Sun-ok; An Hyoung-sook	Chinese Taipei; Chen Chien-Hao; Hsieh Sheng-Fu; Lin Ya-Chin; Chang Yao-Chien	South Korea; Bak Jae-ung; Kim Ji-su; Lee Chan-mi; Heo Seon-sil
Mixed team	South Korea; Park Ji-hong; Choi Hong-chang; Park Sun-ok; An Hyoung-sook	Chinese Taipei; Chen Chien-Hao; Hsieh Sheng-Fu; Lin Ya-Chin; Chang Yao-Chien	Ukraine; Sergiy Trubin; Rostyslav Maier; Kateryna Kovalchuk; Viktoriia Semizenko
