= Bafra Sports Hall =

Indoor sports venue in Bafra, Samsun, Turkey

- Bafra Kapalı Spor Salonu
- Location of the sports hall in Turkey.
- Address: Fatih Mah., Sedde Yolu 2. Sok.
- Location: Bafra, Samsun, Turkey
- Coordinates: 41°34′39″N 35°53′43″E
- Capacity: 2,000

Construction
- Groundbreaking: May 5, 2012
- Opened: December 20, 2013; 12 years ago

Tenants
- 2008 Balkan U-19 Badminton Championship; 2015 Balkan Kungfu Wushu Championship; 2015 BInternational Wushu Championship; 2017 Summer Deaflympics

Bafra Sports Hall (Turkish: Bafra Kapalı Spor Salonu) is a multi-purpose indoor sport venue located in Bafra district of Samsun Province, northern Turkey.

The sports hall is situated in Fatih Mah., Sedde Yolu 2. Sok. in Bafra. It hosts badminton, wrestling, taekwondo and Wushu events. Groundbreaking for the construction of the sports hall took place on May 5, 2012. It was opened on December 20, 2013. The venue has a seating capacity for 2,000 spectators, including 100 for VIP, 100 for media members, 100 for accredited sportspeople and 80 for physically handicapped people.

== International events hosted ==
The 2008 Balkan U19 Badminton Championship was the first international sports event hosted by the old Bafra Sport Hall. In 2015, the Balkan Kungfu Wushu Championship, and International Wushu Championship were held in the sport hall. The venue will host badminton events of the 2017 Summer Deaflympics.
