= Basketball at the 2021 Summer Deaflympics =

Deaflympics event

- Venue: Clube Juvenil - Sede Campestre; Ginásio Vasco da Gama; SESI Centro Esportivo
- Location: Brazil, Caxias Do Sul
- Dates: 30 April–13 May

Champions
- Men: Ukraine
- Women: United States

Basketball at the 2021 Summer Deaflympics was held in Caxias Do Sul, Brazil from 30 April to 13 May 2022.

== Men's tournament ==
=== Group stage ===
==== Group A ====
| Pos | Team | Pld | W | L | PF | PA | PD | Pts | Qualification |
|---|---|---|---|---|---|---|---|---|---|
| 1 | United States | 4 | 4 | 0 | 401 | 222 | 179 | 8 | Quarterfinals |
| 2 | Israel | 4 | 3 | 1 | 312 | 270 | 42 | 7 | Quarterfinals |
| 3 | Poland | 4 | 2 | 2 | 376 | 247 | 129 | 6 | Quarterfinals |
| 4 | Argentina | 4 | 1 | 3 | 297 | 309 | -12 | 5 | Quarterfinals |
| 5 | Kenya | 4 | 0 | 4 | 99 | 437 | -338 | 4 | |

==== Group B ====
| Pos | Team | Pld | W | L | PF | PA | PD | Pts | Qualification |
|---|---|---|---|---|---|---|---|---|---|
| 1 | Ukraine | 5 | 5 | 0 | 443 | 222 | 221 | 10 | Quarterfinals |
| 2 | Greece | 5 | 4 | 1 | 317 | 293 | 24 | 9 | Quarterfinals |
| 3 | Venezuela | 5 | 3 | 2 | 404 | 314 | 90 | 8 | Quarterfinals |
| 4 | Lithuania | 5 | 2 | 3 | 370 | 322 | 48 | 7 | Quarterfinals |
| 5 | Brazil | 5 | 1 | 4 | 233 | 425 | -192 | 6 | |
| 6 | Chinese Taipei | 5 | 0 | 5 | 214 | 405 | -191 | 5 | |

=== Knockout stage ===
==== Elimination ====
Quarterfinals
10 May
United States | 87
Lithuania | 80
10 May
Poland | 64
Greece | 53
10 May
Israel | 59
Venezuela | 80
10 May
Argentina | 50
Ukraine | 88

Semifinals
11 May
United States | 87
Poland | 81
11 May
Venezuela | 72
Ukraine | 82

Gold medal
13 May
United States | 66
Ukraine | 91
Bronze medal
13 May
Venezuela | 68
Poland | 62

==== Classification ====
5th to 8th place semi-finals
11 May
Lithuania | 73
Greece | 56
11 May
Argentina | 78
Israel | 77

5th-place match
12 May
Lithuania | 77
Argentina | 87
7th-place match
12 May
Greece | 86
Israel | 88

== Women's tournament ==
=== Group stage ===
==== Group A ====
| Pos | Team | Pld | W | L | PF | PA | PD | Pts | Qualification |
|---|---|---|---|---|---|---|---|---|---|
| 1 | Italy | 3 | 3 | 0 | 261 | 105 | 156 | 6 | Quarterfinals |
| 2 | Greece | 3 | 2 | 1 | 192 | 138 | 54 | 5 | Quarterfinals |
| 3 | Poland | 3 | 1 | 2 | 218 | 126 | 92 | 4 | Quarterfinals |
| 4 | Brazil | 3 | 0 | 3 | 31 | 333 | -302 | 3 | Quarterfinals |

==== Group B ====
| Pos | Team | Pld | W | L | PF | PA | PD | Pts | Qualification |
|---|---|---|---|---|---|---|---|---|---|
| 1 | United States | 3 | 3 | 0 | 264 | 143 | 121 | 6 | Quarterfinals |
| 2 | Turkey | 3 | 2 | 1 | 215 | 173 | 42 | 5 | Quarterfinals |
| 3 | Lithuania | 3 | 1 | 2 | 252 | 184 | 68 | 4 | Quarterfinals |
| 4 | Kenya | 3 | 0 | 3 | 79 | 310 | -231 | 3 | Quarterfinals |

=== Knockout stage ===
==== Elimination ====
Quarterfinals
10 May
Italy | 79
Kenya | 34
10 May
Poland | 60
Turkey | 52
10 May
Greece | 61
Lithuania | 56
10 May
United States | 87
Brazil | 18

Semifinals
11 May
Italy | 73
Poland | 58
11 May
Greece | 61
United States | 68

Gold medal
13 May
Italy | 77
United States | 91
Bronze medal
13 May
Poland | 71
Greece | 61

==== Classification ====
5th to 8th-place semifinals
11 May
Turkey | 69
Kenya | 36
11 May
Lithuania | 123
Brazil | 6

5th-place match
12 May
Turkey | 69
Lithuania | 85
7th-place match
12 May
Kenya | 98
Brazil | 11
