= Malaysian Deaf Sports Association =

Governing body of deaf sports in Malaysia

Persatuan Sukan Orang Pekak Malaysia
- Sport: Deaf sports
- Jurisdiction: Malaysia
- Abbreviation: MSDeaf
- Founded: 1993
- Affiliation: CISS
- Headquarters: Kuala Lumpur
- Location: Dataran Dwitasik, Bandar Sri Permaisuri, Kuala Lumpur
- President: Ong Shin Ruenn
- Secretary: Kamarzaman Haji Harun

Official website
- www.msdeaf.org.my
- (Malaysia)

Malaysian Deaf Sports Association also simply known as MSDeaf is the national governing body of deaf sports in Malaysia established in 1993. It is also affiliated with the Comite International des Sports des Sourds since 1993. Nevertheless, the association only received recognition from the Malaysian government in 2018.

On 5 April 2018, the Malaysian government recognised the Malaysian Deaf Sports Association as the sole national federation to deal with the deaf sports after passing the amendment of National Sports Development Act which got approved in the parliament. The then-Minister of Youth and Sports, Khairy Jamaluddin presented the amendment of the National Sports Development Act to the parliament which was approved on 3 April 2018.

== Activities ==
The Federation is responsible for sending the deaf sportspeople representing Malaysia at the Deaflympics since the 1993 Summer Deaflympics. The Malaysian Deaf Sports Association is also responsible for sending their athletes to compete at the Asia Pacific Deaf Games and in other internationally recognised sports events which are in accordance with the rules and regulations of the International Committee of Sports for the Deaf. (ICSD)

== See also ==
- Malaysia at the 2017 Summer Deaflympics
