= Judo at the 2025 Summer Deaflympics =

- Venue: Tokyo Budokan, Adachi, Tokyo, Japan
- Dates: 16-18 November 2025

Judo at the 2025 Summer Deaflympics was held at the Tokyo Budokan in Tokyo, Japan from 16 to 18 November 2025.

16 medal events were held, consists of 8 male events and 8 female events.

== Medal table ==
* Host nation (Japan)

Rank	NOC	Gold	Silver	Bronze	Total
1	Kazakhstan	5	2	5	12
2	South Korea	3	2	4	9
3	Ukraine	2	4	2	8
4	France	2	1	1	4
5	Brazil	1	0	0	1
5	Individual Neutral Athletes	1	0	0	1
5	Portugal	1	0	0	1
5	United States	1	0	0	1
9	Turkey	0	2	4	6
10	Algeria	0	2	0	2
11	Azerbaijan	0	1	0	1
11	Hungary	0	1	0	1
11	Mexico	0	1	0	1
14	Japan*	0	0	7	7
15	Iran	0	0	4	4
16	Argentina	0	0	1	1
16	Cuba	0	0	1	1
16	Kyrgyzstan	0	0	1	1
16	Poland	0	0	1	1
16	Venezuela	0	0	1	1
Totals (20 entries)		16	16	32	64

== Medalists ==
=== Men ===
Event	Gold	Silver	Bronze
-60 kg	Pedro Felipe Dantas; Brazil	Joshgun Aliyev; Azerbaijan	Baisalbek Orozali Uuru; Kyrgyzstan
-60 kg	Pedro Felipe Dantas; Brazil	Joshgun Aliyev; Azerbaijan	Altynbek Kakitayev; Kazakhstan
-66 kg	Gulame Khamze; Kazakhstan	Abderrahmane Bouhidel; Algeria	Ali Salahshour Gol Khani; Iran
-66 kg	Gulame Khamze; Kazakhstan	Abderrahmane Bouhidel; Algeria	Lee Ju-ho; South Korea
-73 kg	Shadiyar Kuandyk; Kazakhstan	Hwang Hyeon; South Korea	Hryhorii Vshestenko; Ukraine
-73 kg	Shadiyar Kuandyk; Kazakhstan	Hwang Hyeon; South Korea	Gamou Kazuma; Japan
-81 kg	Yerkebulan Kanafin; Kazakhstan	Patrik Otvos; Hungary	Raphael Ourednik; France
-81 kg	Yerkebulan Kanafin; Kazakhstan	Patrik Otvos; Hungary	Fukasawa Masato; Japan
-90 kg	Kim Min-seok; South Korea	Luka Netiaha; Ukraine	Mondori Mizuki; Japan
-90 kg	Kim Min-seok; South Korea	Luka Netiaha; Ukraine	Hossein Allahkarimi; Iran
-100 kg	Arthur Repiquet; France	Toktarbek Aidarbek; Kazakhstan	Yang Jung-mu; South Korea
-100 kg	Arthur Repiquet; France	Toktarbek Aidarbek; Kazakhstan	Takahashi Tomoki; Japan
+100 kg	Amadou Meite; France	Samet Bulut; Turkey	Masoud Rastegar; Iran
+100 kg	Amadou Meite; France	Samet Bulut; Turkey	Sabirzhan Khapizov; Kazakhstan
Team	Kazakhstan; Yerkebulan Kanafin; Toktarbek Aidarbek; Shadiyar Kuandyk	France; Raphael Ourednik; Arthur Repiquet; Thomas Estelle	Iran; Hossein Allahkarimi; Masoud Rastegar; Ali Salahshour Gol Khani
Team	Kazakhstan; Yerkebulan Kanafin; Toktarbek Aidarbek; Shadiyar Kuandyk	France; Raphael Ourednik; Arthur Repiquet; Thomas Estelle	Japan; Mondori Mizuki; Fukasawa Masato; Gamou Kazuma

=== Women ===
Event	Gold	Silver	Bronze
-48 kg	Alina Pozdeeva; Individual Neutral Athletes	Maria Isabel Huitron; Mexico	Aiym Zhetpisbayeva; Kazakhstan
-48 kg	Alina Pozdeeva; Individual Neutral Athletes	Maria Isabel Huitron; Mexico	Yelyzaveta Didorenko; Ukraine
-52 kg	Jeong Suk-hwa; South Korea	Anna Shostak; Ukraine	Kishino Ayane; Japan
-52 kg	Jeong Suk-hwa; South Korea	Anna Shostak; Ukraine	Dominika Bolek; Poland
-57 kg	Joana Santos; Portugal	Buse Tıraş; Turkey	Seo Eun-ji; South Korea
-57 kg	Joana Santos; Portugal	Buse Tıraş; Turkey	Mayerlyn Nereida Rodriguez; Venezuela
-63 kg	Kateryna Shepeliuk; Ukraine	Lee Hyeon-ah; South Korea	Yadira Ramos Ramirez; Cuba
-63 kg	Kateryna Shepeliuk; Ukraine	Lee Hyeon-ah; South Korea	Esma Gökülü; Turkey
-70 kg	Amina Faizulina; Kazakhstan	Maryna Pohorelova; Ukraine	Kinugawa Akatsuki; Japan
-70 kg	Amina Faizulina; Kazakhstan	Maryna Pohorelova; Ukraine	Valentina Bonfanti; Argentina
-78 kg	Hong Eun-mi; South Korea	Bouchra Belinda Sadi; Algeria	Anna Kramorova; Kazakhstan
-78 kg	Hong Eun-mi; South Korea	Bouchra Belinda Sadi; Algeria	Yadigar Talayhan; Turkey
+78 kg	Nina Cutro-Kelly; United States	Oksana Kravchenko; Ukraine	Elif Gülşen; Turkey
+78 kg	Nina Cutro-Kelly; United States	Oksana Kravchenko; Ukraine	Olga Garaeva; Kazakhstan
Team	Ukraine; Kateryna Shepeliuk; Oksana Kravchenko; Anna Shostak	Kazakhstan; Anastassiya Timoshenkova; Anna Kramorova; Feride Kara Ogly	South Korea; Seo Eun-ji; Hong Eun-mi; Jeong Suk-hwa
Team	Ukraine; Kateryna Shepeliuk; Oksana Kravchenko; Anna Shostak	Kazakhstan; Anastassiya Timoshenkova; Anna Kramorova; Feride Kara Ogly	Turkey; Esma Gökülü; Elif Gülşen; Buse Tıraş
