= Tamara Belenkova =

Ukrainian Deaflympic volleyball player

Personal information
- Full name: Tamara Anatoliivna Belenkova
- Nationality: Ukraine
- Born: July 17, 1958; Mozoliivka, Poltava oblast, Ukrainian SSR, Soviet Union
- Died: 29 March 2017 (aged 58); Kyiv, Ukraine
Honours
Women's deaf volleyball
Deaflympics
Representing Soviet Union
Gold medal – first place	1981 Cologne	Team
Representing Ukraine
Gold medal – first place	2005 Melbourne	Team
Gold medal – first place	2009 Taibei	Team
Silver medal – second place	1997 Copenhagen	Team
Bronze medal – third place	1993 Sofia	Team
Bronze medal – third place	2001 Rome	Team
World Championships
Gold medal – first place	2008 Buenos Aires	Team

Tamara Anatoliivna Belenkova née Kuka (Ukrainian: Тамара Анатоліївна Беленкова (Кука), 17 July 1958 – 29 March 2017) was a Soviet and Ukrainian deaf volleyballist.

== Early life ==
Tamara Belenkova was born on July 17, 1958 in Mozoliivka in a working family. Due to the disease, she became deaf when she was only 1 year old.

In 1965, she entered the first grade of the Myrhorod special school for hearing-impaired children. In 1973, Tamara graduated from the 8th grade of Myrhorod special school and her parents transferred her to the Kyiv special school No. 18, where she studied until 1976.

== Career ==
In 1975 and 1976, Belenkova won a USSR Deaf Volleyball Cup and became a member of the Soviet Union Deaf Volleyball Team.

In 1981, Belenkova represented the Soviet Union at the Summer Deaflympics, held in Cologne, where she won a gold medal.

In 1982–1989 Belenkova competed at the European Deaf Volleyball Championships, winning two gold medals overall.

In 1993, Belenkova won a bronze medal at the Summer Deaflympics in Sofia. The following year, at the 1994 European Deaf Volleyball Championships, Belenkova became a European champion with Ukrainian national team.

In 1997, at the Summer Deaflympics in Copenhagen, Belenkova won a silver medal in women's deaf volleyball. In 1999, at the European Deaf Volleyball Championships in Moscow, Belenkova became a European champion with Ukrainian national team.

At the 2001 Summer Deaflympics in Rome Belenkova repeated her achievement of 1993 Summer Deaflympics, winning a bronze medal.

In 2005, Belenkova competed at the Summer Deaflympics in Melbourne, winning a gold medal.

In 2008, Belenkova competed at the World Deaf Volleyball Championships, winning a gold medal and becoming a world champion.

The following year, Belenkova competed at the 2009 Summer Deaflympics, where she won a gold medal.

On March 29, 2017, Tamara Belenkova died in Kyiv.
