= Boon Wei Ying =

Malaysian deaf badminton player (born 1995)

Boon Wei Ying 文炜楹
Personal information
- Born: 29 January 1995 (age 31) Klebang, Malacca, Malaysia
- Education: University of Malaya

Sport
- Sport: Badminton
Medal record
Badminton
Representing Malaysia
Deaflympics
Gold medal – first place	2021 Caxias do Sul	Women's doubles
Silver medal – second place	2017 Samsun	Mixed doubles
Silver medal – second place	2021 Caxias do Sul	Mixed doubles
Bronze medal – third place	2021 Caxias do Sul	Women's singles
Bronze medal – third place	2025 Tokyo	Mixed doubles

Boon Wei Ying (Chinese: 文炜楹; born 29 January 1995) is a Malaysian deaf badminton player. She won one gold, silver and bronze medal in 2021 Summer Deaflympics (held in May 2022) in badminton and silver medal in 2017 Summer Deaflympics. She also first Malaysian Deaflympic get a gold medal after 21-year Deaflympics gold drought.

== Personal life ==
Her brother, Boon Xin Yuan is also a badminton player.
