= Volleyball at the 2025 Summer Deaflympics =

Deaflympics event

- Venue: Komazawa Volleyball Courts (indoor); Omori Higashi Waterside Sports Square (beach)
- Dates: 16–25 November 2025

Volleyball at the 2025 Summer Deaflympics was held from 16 to 25 November 2025 at Tokyo, Japan. Two different venues were used, which were Komazawa Volleyball Courts for indoor events and Omori Higashi Waterside Sports Square for beach events.

Four medal events were held, consists of two indoor events and two beach events.

== Medal table ==
* Host nation (Japan)

Rank	NOC	Gold	Silver	Bronze	Total
1	Ukraine	2	0	2	4
2	Germany	1	0	0	1
2	Japan*	1	0	0	1
4	Italy	0	1	1	2
4	Turkey	0	1	1	2
6	Austria	0	1	0	1
6	Lithuania	0	1	0	1
Totals (7 entries)		4	4	4	12

== Medalists ==
=== Indoor volleyball ===
Event	Gold	Silver	Bronze
Men	Ukraine; Maksym Osyka; Volodymyr Zelenskyi; Vasyl Voloshyn; Illia Nikiforov; Tykhon Kolbasin; Oleksandr Poltoratskyi; Andrii Hrushka; Ivan Kryvobok; Dmytrii Renkas; Valerii Radchenko; Stefan Karabets; Maksym Donets	Italy; Gabriele Scudiero; Alberto Caselli; Emanuele D'Arienzo; Silvio Siviero; Lorenzo Verdecchia; Riccardo Hoffer; Enrico Zappavigna; Giovanni Morrone; Marco Malfasi; Valerio Aquilani; Riccardo Dell'arte; Carlo Pallante	Turkey; Hilmi Kaan Çiçek; Hakan Soylu; Mehmet Almaz; Emrullah Palaz; Resul Tekin; Furkan Genç; Cevat Şimşek; Rıdvan Karatas; Emir Deniz; Kadir Akyıldız; Fatih Yiğiter; Mert Karatas; Emre Ciftci; Bilal Yorur
Women	Japan	Turkey	Ukraine

=== Beach volleyball ===
Event	Gold	Silver	Bronze
Men	Germany; Henrik Templin; Tobias Franz	Austria; Jakob-Lars Kurzmann; Nikita Tkachenko	Ukraine; Serhii Tarasov; Anton Koshkarov
Women	Ukraine; Yuliia Chernenko; Raisa Rylova	Lithuania; Birute Aleknaviciute; Doroteja Keraite	Italy; Silvia Bennardo; Alice Tomat

== Indoor Results ==
=== Men ===
A: USA-ITA-JPN-FRA-BUL

B: TUR-UKR-MEX-BRA-IND

IND withdraw = Lose 4 match 0-3 (0 - 25,0 - 25,0 - 25)

QF: USA 3-0 BRA / UKR 3-0 JPN / ITA 3-0 MEX / TUR 3-0 FRA

SF: UKR 3-0 USA / ITA 3-2 TUR

F: TUR 3-1 USA / UKR 3-0 ITA

=== Women ===
A: JPN-ITA-USA-KEN

B: TUR-UKR-BRA-CAN

KEN withdraw = Lose 4 match 0-3 (0 - 25,0 - 25,0 - 25)

QF: JPN 3-0 CAN / UKR 3-0 USA / ITA 3-0 BRA / TUR 3-0 KEN

SF: JPN 3-2 UKR / TUR 3-1 ITA

F: JPN 3-0 TUR / UKR 3-0 ITA

== Beach Results ==
https://deaflympics2025-games.jp/en/Watch-the-Games/Official-Results/Beach_Volleyball_Draws_and_Results/#gsc.tab=0

=== Men ===
22 teams in 5 group

=== Women ===
12 teams in 3 group
