= Volleyball at the 2021 Summer Deaflympics =

Deaflympics event

- Location: Brazil, Caxias Do Sul
- Dates: 3–13 May

Champions
- Men: Turkey
- Women: Turkey

Volleyball at the 2021 Summer Deaflympics was held in Caxias Do Sul, Brazil from 3 to 13 May 2022.

== Medal summary ==
* Host nation (Brazil)

Rank	NOC	Gold	Silver	Bronze	Total
1	Ukraine (UKR)	2	3	1	6
2	Turkey (TUR)	2	0	0	2
3	Italy (ITA)	0	1	1	2
4	Germany (GER)	0	0	1	1
4	Lithuania (LTU)	0	0	1	1
Totals (5 entries)		4	4	4	12

== Medalists ==
=== Indoor volleyball ===
Event	Gold	Silver	Bronze
Men	Turkey	Ukraine	Italy
Women	Turkey	Italy	Ukraine

=== Beach volleyball ===
Event	Gold	Silver	Bronze
Men	Ukraine (UKR)	Ukraine (UKR)	Germany (GER)
Women	Ukraine (UKR)	Ukraine (UKR)	Lithuania (LTU)

== Men's indoor competition ==
=== Group stage ===
==== Group A ====
Pos	Team	Pld	W	L	Pts	Qualification
1	Brazil (H)	0	0	0	0	Quarterfinals
2	Italy	0	0	0	0	Quarterfinals
3	France	0	0	0	0	Quarterfinals
4	Venezuela	0	0	0	0	Quarterfinals
5	Mexico	0	0	0	0	

==== Group B ====
Pos	Team	Pld	W	L	Pts	Qualification
1	Ukraine	0	0	0	0	Quarterfinals
2	Turkey	0	0	0	0	Quarterfinals
3	Poland	0	0	0	0	Quarterfinals
4	Japan	0	0	0	0	Quarterfinals
5	Ghana	0	0	0	0	

=== Knockout stage ===
==== Elimination ====
Quarterfinals
10 May
Italy	3
Japan	0
10 May
Brazil	0
Turkey	3
10 May
France	3
Poland	1
10 May
Ukraine	3
Mexico	0

Semifinals
11 May
Italy	0
Turkey	3
11 May
France	0
Ukraine	3

Gold medal
13 May
Turkey	3
Ukraine	0
Bronze medal
13 May
Italy	-
France	-

==== Classification ====
5th–8th place semi-finals
11 May
Japan	0
Brazil	3
11 May
Poland	3
Mexico	0

5th place match
12 May
Brazil	0
Poland	3
7th place match
12 May
Mexico	3
Japan	0

== Women's indoor competition ==
=== Group stage ===
==== Group A ====
Pos	Team	Pld	W	L	Pts	Qualification
1	Ukraine	3	3	0	0	Quarterfinals
2	Japan	3	2	1	0	Quarterfinals
3	Brazil (H)	3	1	2	0	Quarterfinals
4	Mexico	3	0	3	0	Quarterfinals

Date	Time		Score		Set 1	Set 2	Set 3	Set 4	Set 5	Total	Report
4 May	12:00	Brazil	3–2	Mexico	25–18	25–15	18–25	23–25	15–9	106–92	
4 May	14:00	Ukraine	3–2	Japan	21–25	23–25	25–20	25–18	15–13	109–101	
6 May	12:00	Mexico	0–3	Japan	11–25	11–25	9–25			31–75	
6 May	14:00	Brazil	0–3	Ukraine	13–25	11–25	8–25			32–75	
8 May	12:00	Ukraine	3–0	Mexico	25–13	25–12	25–4			75–29	
8 May	14:00	Japan	3–0	Brazil	25–20	25–12	25–12			75–44	

==== Group B ====
Pos	Team	Pld	W	L	Pts	Qualification
1	Turkey	3	3	0	0	Quarterfinals
2	Italy	3	2	1	0	Quarterfinals
3	United States	3	1	2	0	Quarterfinals
4	Poland	3	0	3	0	Quarterfinals

Date	Time		Score		Set 1	Set 2	Set 3	Set 4	Set 5	Total	Report
5 May	12:00	Italy	3–1	Poland	25–12	22–25	25–22	25–19		97–78	
5 May	14:00	Turkey	3–1	United States	25–21	23–25	25–15	25–17		98–78	
7 May	12:00	Poland	1–3	United States	25–20	15–25	16–25	20–25		76–95	
7 May	14:00	Italy	1–3	Turkey	24–26	25–18	21–25	23–25		93–94	
9 May	12:00	Turkey	3–0	Poland	25–10	25–13	25–20			75–43	
9 May	14:00	United States	0–3	Italy	17–25	18–25	22–25			57–75	

=== Knockout stage ===
==== Elimination ====
Quarter-finals
10 May
Turkey	3
Mexico	0
10 May
Japan	3
United States	0
10 May
Italy	3
Brazil	0
10 May
Ukraine	3
Poland	0

Semi-finals
11 May
Turkey	3
Japan	0
11 May
Italy	3
Ukraine	1

Gold medal
13 May
Turkey	3
Italy	1
Bronze medal
13 May
Japan	0
Ukraine	3

Date	Time		Score		Set 1	Set 2	Set 3	Set 4	Set 5	Total	Report
10 May	12:00	Turkey	3–0	Mexico	25–6	25–14	25–13			75–33	
10 May	14:00	Japan	3–0	United States	25–20	25–18	25–17			75–55	
10 May	16:00	Italy	3–0	Brazil	25–16	25–12	25–10			75–38	
10 May	18:00	Ukraine	3–0	Poland	25–17	25–12	25–20			75–49	
11 May	12:00	Turkey	3–0	Japan	–	–	–			0–0	
11 May	14:00	Italy	3–1	Ukraine	–	–	–	–		0–0	
13 May	12:00	Japan	0-3	Ukraine	–	–	–			0–0	
13 May	14:00	Turkey	3–1	Italy	25–12	25–18	21–25	25–19		96–74	

==== Classification ====
5th–8th place semi-finals
11 May
Poland	3
Brazil	0
11 May
United States	3
Mexico	0

5th place match
12 May
Poland	0
United States	3
7th place match
12 May
Mexico	1
Brazil	3
