= Brazil at the 2021 Summer Deaflympics =

Brazil at the 2022 Summer Deaflympics
- IOC code: BRA
- NOC: Brazilian Deaf Sports Federation
- Website: www.cbds.org.br

in Caxias do Sul
- Competitors: 159 (91 men and 68 women)
- Medals: Gold 0 Silver 0 Bronze 4 Total 4

Summer Deaflympics appearances (overview)
- 1993; 1997; 2001; 2005; 2009; 2013; 2017; 2021

Brazil as the host nation of the 2021 Summer Deaflympics is currently competing in the event fielding 159 athletes. This was the 8th consecutive time that Brazil was eligible to participate at the Summer Deaflympics since making its debut in Sofia 1993.

Brazil is also having the largest number of delegates among the nations competing in the multi-sport event and this is also the largest ever delegation that Brazil has sent in a single edition of the Summer Deaflympics.

== Football ==
Brazil men's deaf national football team and Brazil women's deaf national football team are competing in the football competition as the host nation.

== Basketball ==
Brazil men's deaf national basketball team and Brazil women's deaf national basketball team are competing in the basketball tournament as the host nation.

== Handball ==
Brazil men's deaf national handball team and Brazil women's deaf national handball team are competing in the handball tournament as the host nation.

== Table tennis ==
- Beatriz Araújo Amorim
- Thiago Benedito Castro
- Maria Fernanda da Silva Costa

== Karate ==
- Isabella Vieira da Silva Bahia

== Cycling ==
- Kamilla Rodrigues Barbosa

== Judo ==
- Letícia Ribeiro Bauermann
- Rômulo da Silva Crispim
- Carolina Stefany Kich Da Silva
- Leonardo Francisco Dos Santos
- Alexandre Soares Fernandes

== Athletics ==
- Aline Bieger
- Aguinaldo Padilha Da Silva

== Orienteering ==
- Madeline Silva Silveira Boeck
- Linda Francieli Pucheta Da Silva

== Badminton ==
- Renata Faustino Da Silva
- Gabriel Hovelacque De Faria
- Geisa Vieira De Oliveira

== Beach Volleyball ==
- Lucas Jambeiro Dos Santos
