= Disability classification in judo =

Medical classification system for Para judo

Para judo classification is the medical classification system for Para judo. Judokas with a disability are classified into different categories based on their disability type. The classification is handled by the Blind Sports Association.

== Definition ==
The blind classifications are based on medical classification, no functional classification.

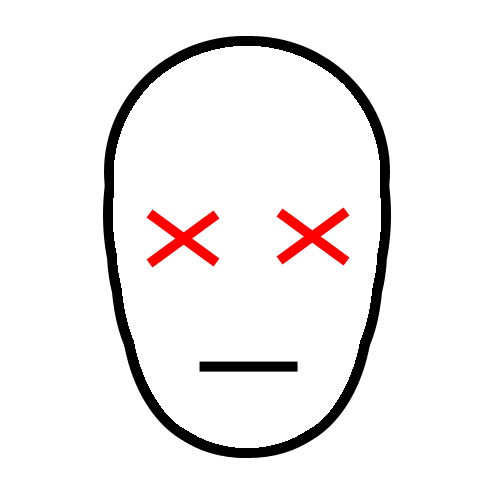
Visualisation of functional vision for a B1 competitor

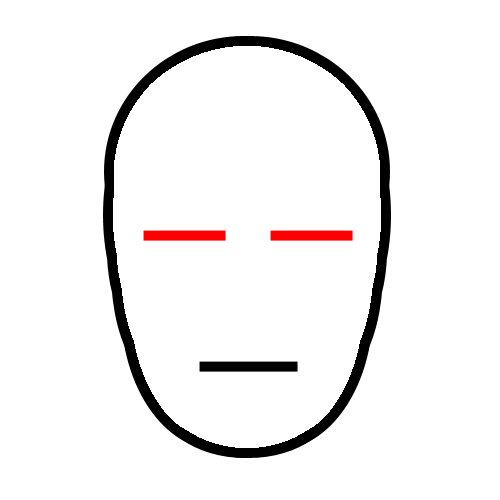
Visualisation of functional vision for a B2 competitor

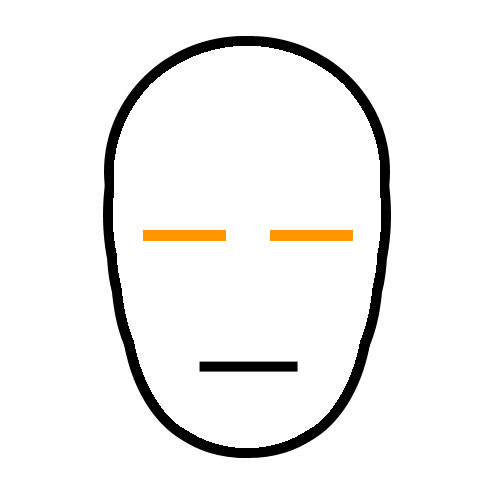
Visualisation of functional vision for a B3 competitor

Beyond the level of vision impairment, research done at the Central Institute on Employment Abilities of the Handicapped in Moscow has found differences in functional capabilities based on differences in visual acuity. This does not play a significant role in judo.

== Governance ==
The sport's classification system is governed by the International Blind Sports Association.

== Eligibility ==
As of 2012, people with visual disabilities are eligible to compete in this sport. The sport is also open to blind people with hearing loss.

== History ==
In 1992, the International Paralympic Committee formally took control of governance for disability sport.

== Classes ==
Classes for the sport are based on weight, not based on functional disability. B1, B2 and B3 athletes compete with each other in their own weight divisions. Men have seven weight divisions and women have six.

B1 competitors, those with the most severe vision problems, have a red 7" diameter circle attached on both sleeves. This identifier makes it easier for referees to spot B1 competitors and give them certain allowances (for example, B1 athletes cannot be expected to see the competition area boundaries). Competitors who are deaf have a small blue circle on their judogi's bib on the back in the right hand corner.

== Process ==
For Australian competitors in this sport, the sport is not supported by the Australian Paralympic Committee. There are three types of classification available for Australian competitors: Provisional, national and international. The first is for club level competitions, the second for state and national competitions, and the third for international competitions. At the 1996 Summer Paralympics, on the spot classification required that classifiers have access to medical equipment like Snellen charts, reflex hammers, and goniometers to properly classify competitors.

== At the Paralympic Games ==
The sport was first played as a medal sport at the 1988 Summer Paralympics. At the 1992 Summer Paralympics, blind people were eligible to participate, with classification being run through IBSA, with classification being done based on weight. At the 2000 Summer Paralympics, 10 assessments were conducted at the Games. This resulted in 1 class change.

Judo competition at the London 2012 Summer Olympics will be held at ExCeL Exhibition Centre from 30 August to 1 September. There will be 13 medal events, and each country may only enter one athlete per event. The total number of athletes per country allowed is six men and five women. Being the host nation, Great Britain is allowed another two competitors (one male, one female).

For the 2016 Summer Paralympics in Rio, the International Paralympic Committee had a zero classification at the Games policy. This policy was put into place in 2014, with the goal of avoiding last minute changes in classes that would negatively impact athlete training preparations. All competitors needed to be internationally classified with their classification status confirmed prior to the Games, with exceptions to this policy being dealt with on a case-by-case basis. In case there was a need for classification or reclassification at the Games despite best efforts otherwise, judo classification was scheduled for 4 to 5 and 6 September at the Paralympic Village.

== Future ==
Going forward, disability sport's major classification body, the International Paralympic Committee, is working on improving classification to be more of an evidence-based system as opposed to a performance-based system so as not to punish elite athletes whose performance makes them appear in a higher class alongside competitors who train less.
