= 2021 Summer Deaflympics =

24th Summer Deaflympics

XXIV Summer Deaflympics
- Host city: Caxias do Sul, Brazil
- Motto: Sport comes from our hearts (Portuguese: O esporte vem dos nossos corações)
- Nations: 72
- Athletes: 2466
- Events: 219 in 18 sports
- Opening: 1 May 2022
- Closing: 15 May 2022
- Opened by: First Lady Michelle Bolsonaro
- Main venue: Festa da Uva Main Paviliion
- Website: website

Summer

Winter

The 2021 Summer Deaflympics, officially known as the 24th Summer Deaflympics or XXIV Summer Deaflympics, and commonly known as Caxias Do Sul 2021, was an international multi-sport event held from 1 to 15 May 2022 in Brazil. The main host city was Caxias do Sul, Brazil, originally scheduled for December 2021 but postponed until May 2022 due to the COVID-19 pandemic. In addition to Caxias, there were events scheduled for the neighboring cities of Farroupilha and Flores da Cunha. In April 2022, CISS has announced that due to the Russian invasion of Ukraine, Russian and Belarusian athletes were barred from competing in Caxias do Sul, and in the same press release it was also announced that the bowling tournament was scheduled to be held in Kuala Lumpur, Malaysia, during October 2022.

This is also the first time since the 2007 Winter Deaflympics, held in Salt Lake City, for the event to be held in the CISS Americas Region, and the third time for the Games to be held in the Southern Hemisphere as the 1989 games were held in Christchurch in New Zealand and 2005 games Melbourne in Australia.

== Host city selection ==
Due to the lack of interested parties, the process of choosing the venue for the Deaflympics was postponed several times, until the Brazilian Confederation of Sports for the Deaf presented an emergency proposal to host the next edition of the Summer Games. Accepted as host country for the 2021 Games at a meeting of the International Committee of Sports for the Deaf on 26 February 2020 Caxias do Sul in Rio Grande do Sul, was proposed as host city and the games were scheduled to take place from 5 to 21 December 2021 during the late spring and early summer at the host city. As a consequence of the postponement of the 2020 Summer Olympics to 2021, it was announced in January 2021 as a result of the COVID-19 pandemic the 2021 Summer Deaflympics was rescheduled to May 2022.

- Caxias do Sul, Brazil - Only bidder

== Sports ==
Originally, the program for this edition would consist of 221 finals in 18 sports. However, due to problems with the available infrastructure and the low number of participants, the bowling events had to be removed from Caxias do Sul and was later relocated to Kuala Lumpur in Malaysia and were held between on 20–30 October 2022. Thus, the program will consist of 216 events in 18 sports. Medals disputed in Malaysia were later added to the medal table and their results and the number of athletes also added to official statistics. New events were added in athletics, karate, orienteering, shooting, and swimming, whereas the number of events in bowling, judo, and taekwondo has been reduced. This was also be the first time since the 2001 Summer Deaflympics that a women's handball tournament was held.

=== Individual sports ===
- Athletics (45)
- Badminton (6)
- Cycling (10)
  - Mountain biking (2)
  - Road (8)
- Golf (2)
- Judo (16)
- Karate (16)
- Orienteering (10)
- Shooting (13)
- Swimming (42)
- Table tennis (7)
- Taekwondo (11)
- Tennis (5)
- Wrestling (16)
  - Freestyle (8)
  - Greco-Roman (8)

=== Team sports ===
- Basketball (2)
- Football (2)
- Handball (2)
- Volleyball (4)
  - Indoor volleyball (2)
  - Beach volleyball (2)

=== Bowling ===
Bowling was held between on 21–30 October 2022 in Kuala Lumpur.

- Bowling () (12)

== Calendar ==
In the following calendar for the events held in Caxias do Sul, each blue box represents an event competition. The yellow boxes represent days during which medal-awarding finals for a sport are held. The number in each yellow box represents the number of finals that are contested on that day. This schedule doesn't include the bowling events.

OC	Opening ceremony	●	Event competitions	1	Gold medal events	CC	Closing ceremony

April\May	30th Sat	1st Sun	2nd Mon	3rd Tue	4th Wed	5th Thu	6th Fri	7th Sat	8th Sun	9th Mon	10th Tue	11th Wed	12th Thu	13th Fri	14th Sat	15th Sun	Events
Ceremonies		OC														CC	—N/a
Athletics								1	8	6	8		2	8	9	2	45
Badminton			●	●	1		●	●	●	●	●	5					6
Basketball			●	●	●	●	●	●	●	●		●	●	2			2
Beach volleyball				●	●	●	●	●	●	●		●	2				2
Cycling			2		2		2		2		2						10
Football	●		●	●	●	●	●	●	●	●	●	●	●	1	1		2
Golf								●	●	●	●	2					2
Handball			●	●	●	●	●	●	●	●	●	●	●	●	2		2
Judo				6 ?	6 ?	2											16
Karate			6	7	3												16
Orienteering							2	2	1		2		2		2		10 ?
Shooting			●	1	1	1	1		1	2	2	2	2				13
Swimming			5	5	6	5	5	6	5	6							42 ?
Table tennis						●	1		1	●	●	2					5 ?
Taekwondo							3	4	4								11
Tennis				●	●	●	●	●		●	●	2	2	1			5
Volleyball					●	●	●	●	●		●	●	●	2			2
Wrestling											●	8		●	8		16
Daily medal events			13	19	19	8	14	13	22	14	14	21	10	14	22	2	207
Cumulative total			13	32	51	59	73	86	108	122	136	157	167	181	203	207	207
April\May	30th Sat	1st Sun	2nd Mon	3rd Tue	4th Wed	5th Thu	6th Fri	7th Sat	8th Sun	9th Mon	10th Tue	11th Wed	12th Thu	13th Fri	14th Sat	15th Sun	Events

== Participating nations ==
Athletes from Russia and Belarus were barred from competing at the event after a ban as a result of the Russian invasion of Ukraine. Australia, China and Great Britain withdrew from the competition because of the worsening conditions related to the COVID-19 pandemic at their countries.

72 National Deaf Sports Federations (with bowling 73 nations) sent their delegations to Caxias do Sul and Kuala Lumpur:

1. Afghanistan (1)
2. Algeria (12)
3. Argentina (70)
4. Armenia (5)
5. Austria (6)
6. Belgium (4)
7. Brazil (199) (Host)
8. Bulgaria (22)
9. Canada (18)
10. Cameroon (16)
11. Chile (8)
12. Chinese Taipei (50)
13. Colombia (23)
14. Croatia (28)
15. Cuba (18)
16. Czech Republic (23)
17. Denmark (34)
18. Dominican Republic (3)
19. Ecuador (11)
20. Egypt (21)
21. Estonia (7)
22. France (56)
23. Gabon (3)
24. Germany (75)
25. Ghana (75)
26. Greece (36)
27. Hong Kong (12)
28. Hungary (20)
29. India (64)
30. Iran (68)
31. Iraq (25)
32. Israel (18)
33. Italy (78)
34. Japan (93)
35. Kazakhstan (58)
36. Kenya (110)
37. South Korea (90)
38. Kyrgyzstan (15)
39. Kuwait (17)
40. Latvia (11)
41. Lithuania (42)
42. Malaysia (23)
43. Mali (20)
44. Mauritius (5)
45. Mexico (44)
46. Mongolia (5)
47. Netherlands (21)
48. Nigeria (8)
49. North Macedonia (1)
50. Norway (6)
51. Paraguay (1)
52. Pakistan (1)
53. Philippines (3)
54. Poland (144)
55. Portugal (12)
56. Saudi Arabia (23)
57. Senegal (19)
58. Serbia (14)
59. Singapore (2)
60. Slovakia (12)
61. Slovenia (4)
62. South Africa (7)
63. Spain (7)
64. Switzerland (5)
65. Thailand (19)
66. Turkey (130)
67. Ukraine (175)
68. United Arab Emirates (7)
69. United States (135)
70. Uruguay (3)
71. Uzbekistan (31)
72. Venezuela (39)

== Medal table ==
* Host nation (Brazil)

2021 Summer Deaflympics medal table
Rank	NDSC	Gold	Silver	Bronze	Total
1	Ukraine (UKR)	64	39	42	145
2	United States (USA)	20	11	24	55
3	South Korea (KOR)	17	20	21	58
4	Iran (IRI)	14	12	14	40
5	Japan (JPN)	12	8	10	30
6	Poland (POL)	8	22	12	42
7	Turkey (TUR)	8	19	17	44
8	France (FRA)	8	3	5	16
9	India (IND)	8	1	8	17
10	Germany (GER)	5	8	6	19
11	Kenya (KEN)	5	7	12	24
12	Italy (ITA)	4	11	8	23
13	Kazakhstan (KAZ)	4	7	18	29
14	Czech Republic (CZE)	4	1	3	8
15	Chinese Taipei (TPE)	3	13	14	30
16	Croatia (CRO)	3	1	0	4
17	Lithuania (LTU)	2	5	3	10
18	Malaysia (MAS)	2	4	1	7
19	Venezuela (VEN)	2	3	12	17
20	Latvia (LAT)	2	2	1	5
21	Slovakia (SVK)	2	1	2	5
22	Cuba (CUB)	2	1	0	3
22	Mexico (MEX)	2	1	0	3
24	Portugal (POR)	2	0	2	4
24	Slovenia (SLO)	2	0	2	4
26	Finland (FIN)	2	0	0	2
27	Greece (GRE)	1	2	6	9
28	Colombia (COL)	1	2	1	4
29	Algeria (ALG)	1	1	3	5
30	Singapore (SGP)	1	1	1	3
31	Dominican Republic (DOM)	1	1	0	2
32	Estonia (EST)	1	0	2	3
33	Denmark (DEN)	1	0	1	2
33	Mongolia (MGL)	1	0	1	2
33	Netherlands (NED)	1	0	1	2
33	United Arab Emirates (UAE)	1	0	1	2
37	Chile (CHI)	1	0	0	1
37	Ecuador (ECU)	1	0	0	1
39	Hungary (HUN)	0	4	4	8
40	Kyrgyzstan (KGZ)	0	2	4	6
41	Spain (ESP)	0	2	1	3
42	Argentina (ARG)	0	1	2	3
42	Bulgaria (BUL)	0	1	2	3
44	Austria (AUT)	0	1	1	2
45	Canada (CAN)	0	1	0	1
46	Brazil (BRA)*	0	0	6	6
47	Armenia (ARM)	0	0	5	5
48	Uzbekistan (UZB)	0	0	3	3
49	Saudi Arabia (KSA)	0	0	2	2
50	Israel (ISR)	0	0	1	1
50	Serbia (SRB)	0	0	1	1
50	Sweden (SWE)	0	0	1	1
50	Thailand (THA)	0	0	1	1
Totals (53 entries)		219	219	288	726

Preceded by Samsun 2017	Summer Deaflympic Games; Caxias do Sul; XXIV Summer Deaflympics (2021)	Succeeded by Tokyo 2025
