= India at the 2025 Summer Deaflympics =

Indian contingent participating at the 2025 Deaflympics

- IOC code: IND
- NOC: All India Sports Council of the Deaf
- Website: aiscd.org

in Tokyo, Japan 15 – 26 November 2025
- Competitors: 73
- Medals: Gold 9 Silver 7 Bronze 4 Total 20

Summer Deaflympics appearances (overview)
- 1924; 1928; 1931; 1935; 1939; 1949; 1953; 1957; 1961; 1965; 1969; 1973; 1977; 1981; 1985; 1989; 1993; 1997; 2001; 2005; 2009; 2013; 2017; 2021

The Republic of India participated in the 2025 Summer Deaflympics in Tokyo, Japan from 15 to 26 November 2025. This was India's 15th appearance in the competition since its Deaflympic debut in 1965.

India sent its highest-ever contingent - a 111-member delegation comprising 73 athletes, 45 men and 28 women, and 38 support staff across 11 sporting disciplines. Jerlin Jayaratchagan was the country's flag-bearer during the opening ceremony.

== Medalists ==
1. Golf at the 2025 Summer Deaflympics - 1 G
2. Karate at the 2025 Summer Deaflympics - 1 B
3. Shooting at the 2025 Summer Deaflympics - 7 G, 6 S, 3 B - 16 T
4. Wrestling at the 2025 Summer Deaflympics - 1 G, 6 S - 2 T

== Athletics ==
Men

Athlete	Event	Heat		Semifinal		Final	
Athlete	Event	Result	Rank	Result	Rank	Result	Rank
Manikandan Kamaraj	100m	11.58	6	Did not advance to next round			

== Badminton ==
Singles

Athlete	Event	Group Stage			Round of 32	Round of 16	Quarterfinals	Semifinals	Final	
Athlete	Event	Opposition Score	Opposition Score	Rank	Opposition Score	Opposition Score	Opposition Score	Opposition Score	Opposition Score	Rank
Abhinav Sharma (1)	Men	Dashchenko (UKR); W 2–0	Zhao (CAN); W 2–0	1Q	Choi (KOR); W 2–0	Savvides (AIN); W 2–0	Gulomzoda (AIN); L 0–2	Did not advance to next round		
Piyush	Men	Cardoso (BRA); W 2–0	Morimoto (JPN); L 1–2	2Q	Petrovic (SVK); W 2–0	Dashchenko (UKR); W 2–1	Efremov (AIN); L 0–2	Did not advance to next round		
Soumyadeep; Chakraborty	Men	Wong (HKG); W 2–0	Reznikas (LTU); W 2–1	1Q	Yin (TPE); W 2–0	Numat (THA); L 1–2	Did not advance to next round			
Aaditya Yadav (5)	Women	Reymond (FRA); W 2–0	Lee (KOR); W 2–0	1Q	—N/a	Fan (TPE); W 2–0	Neudolt (AUT); L 1–2	Did not advance to next round		
Gauranshi Sharma	Women	Demirel (TUR); W 2–0	Chernomorova (UKR); L 0–2	2Q	Jiang (CHN); L 0–2	Did not advance to next round				
Jerlin Jayaratchagan (2)	Women	Yeung (HKG); W 2–0	Bakytova (KAZ); W 2–0	1Q	—N/a	Chiang (TPE); W 2–0	M Yakabe (JPN); W 2–1	Park (KOR); L 0–2	Neudolt (AUT); L 0–2	4
Shreya Singla (6)	Women	Mobasheri (IRI); W 2–0	A Yakabe (JPN); W 2–0	1Q	Küçüksevgili (TUR); W 2–0	Svensson (DEN); W 2–0	Shen (TPE); L 1–2	Did not advance to next round		

Doubles

Athlete	Event	Group Stage				Round of 32	Round of 16	Quarterfinals	Semifinals	Final	
Athlete	Event	Opposition Score	Opposition Score	Opposition Score	Rank	Opposition Score	Opposition Score	Opposition Score	Opposition Score	Opposition Score	Rank
Nisarg Panchal; Piyush	Men	Keiffer / Valledor (FRA); L 0–2	Chen / Cheng (TPE); L 0–2	—N/a	3	Did not advance to next round					
Soumyadeep Chakraborty; Abhinav Sharma	Men	Phudonga / Thapa (NEP); W 2–0	Liu / Yin (TPE); W 2–0	—N/a	1Q	—N/a	Volkov / Yesbergenov (AIN); W 2–0	Numakura / Ohta (JPN); L 0–2	Did not advance to next round		
Jerlin Jayaratchagan; Aaditya Yadav (3)	Women	Chiang / Hsiao (TPE); W 2–0	Jiang / Zhang (CHN); W 2–0	—N/a	1Q	—N/a	Li / Tian (CHN); W 2–0	Lee / Park (KOR); L 0–2	Did not advance to next round		
Gauranshi Sharma; Shreya Singla	Women	Chernomorova / Horobets (UKR); W 2–1	Küçüksevgili / Uludağ (TUR); W 2–0	Chapkanova / Spasova (BUL); W 2–0	1Q	—N/a	Jiang / Zhang (CHN); L 0–2	Did not advance to next round			
Abhinav Sharma; Jerlin Jayaratchagan (1)	Mixed	Choi / Lee (KOR); W 2–0	Sax / Svensson (DEN); W 2–0	—N/a	1Q	—N/a	Liu / Hsiao (TPE); W 2–0	Chakraborty / Yadav (IND); W 2–1	Gulomzoda / Tiurina (AIN); L 1–2		
Piyush; Shreya Singla	Mixed	Heo / Kim (KOR); W 2–1	Dauskurtas / Zymante (BRA); L 1–2	—N/a	2Q	Lau / Chan (HKG); L 0–2	Did not advance to next round				
Nisarg Panchal; Gauranshi Sharma	Mixed	Rimkus / Ramaneckaite (LTU); L 1–2	Shin / Park (BRA); L 0–2	—N/a	3	Did not advance to next round					
Soumyadeep Chakraborty; Aaditya Yadav	Mixed	Lau / Chan (HKG); L 0–2	De Faria / Da Silva (BRA); W 2–0	—N/a	2Q	Kovalenko / Horobets (UKR); W 2–0	M Numakura / C Numakura (JPN); W 2–0	Sharma / Jayaratchagan (IND); L 1–2	Did not advance to next round		

Team

Athlete	Group Stage			Quarterfinals	Semifinals	Final	
Athlete	Opposition Score	Opposition Score	Rank	Opposition Score	Opposition Score	Opposition Score	Rank
Aaditya Yadav; Abhinav Sharma; Gauranshi Sharma; Jerlin Jayaratchagan; Nisarg Panchal; Piyush; Shreya Singla; Soumyadeep Chakraborty	South Korea; W 4–1	Kazakhstan; W 5–0	1Q	Ukraine; W 3–0	China; L 1–3	Chinese Taipei; L 1–3	4

== Golf ==
Athlete	Event	Round 1	Round 2	Round 3	Total		
Athlete	Event	Score	Score	Score	Score	Par	Rank
Harsh Singh	Men's Individual	75	82	81	238	+22	12
Jastar Billing	Men's Individual	89	94	91	274	+58	33
Vibhu Tyagi	Men's Individual	83	76	81	240	+24	T14
Diksha Dagar	Women's Individual	68	65	72	205	–11	1st place, gold medalist(s)

== Shooting ==
Men

Athlete	Event	Qualification		Final	
Athlete	Event	Result	Rank	Result	Rank
Abhinav Deshwal	25 m pistol	575-13x	1Q	44	1st place, gold medalist(s)
Hanmant Sakpal	25 m pistol	573-21x	2Q	27	5
Abhinav Deshwal	10 m air pistol	576-13x	1Q	235.2	2nd place, silver medalist(s)
Rudar Kumar	10 m air pistol	549-12x	12	Did not advance	
Dhanush Srikanth	10 m air rifle	630.6	1Q	252.2	1st place, gold medalist(s)
Murtaza Vania	10 m air rifle	626.3	2Q	250.1	2nd place, silver medalist(s)
Kushagra Rajawat	50 m prone rifle	608.7	7Q	224.3	3rd place, bronze medalist(s)
Shourya Saini	50 m prone rifle	600.2	11	Did not advance	
Kushagra Rajawat	50 m rifle three positions	575-22x	6Q	408.8	6
Shourya Saini	50 m rifle three positions	584-32x	1Q	450.6	2nd place, silver medalist(s)

Women

Athlete	Event	Qualification		Final	
Athlete	Event	Result	Rank	Result	Rank
Anuya Prasad	10 m air pistol	564-11x	3Q	241.1	1st place, gold medalist(s)
Pranjali Dhumal	10 m air pistol	572-12x	1Q	236.8	2nd place, silver medalist(s)
Anuya Prasad	25 m pistol	569-15x	2Q	23	4
Pranjali Dhumal	25 m pistol	573-14x	1Q	34	1st place, gold medalist(s)
Komal Waghmare	10 m air rifle	622.0	3Q	228.3	3rd place, bronze medalist(s)
Mahit Sandhu	10 m air rifle	623.4	2Q	250.5	2nd place, silver medalist(s)
Mahit Sandhu	50 m prone rifle	619.7	1Q	246.1	2nd place, silver medalist(s)
Natasha Joshi	50 m prone rifle	611.6	7Q	119.6	8
Mahit Sandhu	50 m rifle three positions	585-31x	1Q	456.0	1st place, gold medalist(s)
Natasha Joshi	50 m rifle three positions	566-12x	7Q	417.1	5

Mixed

Athlete	Event	Qualification		Final / BM	
Athlete	Event	Result	Rank	Result	Rank
Abhinav Deshwal; Pranjali Dhumal	10 m air pistol	569-20x	1QG	Chinese Taipei; W 16–6	1st place, gold medalist(s)
Rudar Kumar; Anuya Prasad	10 m air pistol	553-10x	7	Did not advance	
Dhanush Srikanth; Mahit Sandhu	10 m air rifle	630.8	1QG	South Korea; W 17–7	1st place, gold medalist(s)
Murtaza Vania; Komal Waghmare	10 m air rifle	623.9	3QG	Ukraine; W 16–12	3rd place, bronze medalist(s)

== Tennis ==
Singles

Athlete	Event	Round of 64	Round of 32	Round of 16	Cons. Round 1	Cons. Round 2	Cons. Round 3	Cons. QF	Semifinals	Final
Athlete	Event	Opposition Score	Opposition Score	Opposition Score	Opposition Score	Opposition Score	Opposition Score	Opposition Score	Opposition Score	Rank
Aaryan Humaney	Men	Beneditti (ITA); L 0–2	—N/a		Kalinowski (POL); L 7–9	Did not advance to next round				
Arshit	Men	Samartsidis (GRE); L 0–2	—N/a		Chahin (ARG); W 2–0	—N/a	Galvez (USA); L 3–8	Did not advance to next round		
Dhananjay Dubey	Men	Wang (TPE); L 0–2	—N/a				Abramov (AIN); L 1–8	Did not advance to next round		
Prithvi Sekhar (5)	Men	—N/a	Schippers (BEL); L 1–1 RET	Did not advance to next round						
Bhavani Kedia (14)	Women	—N/a	Matias (BRA); L 0–2	—N/a			Yünlü (TUR); W 8–5	Routsi (GRE)		
Jafreen Shaik	Women	Mateescu (ITA); L 0–2	—N/a				Banguoğlu (TUR); W 8–1	Ashkenazy (ISR)		
Kirtilata Singh	Women	Gagnant (FRA); L 0–2	—N/a				Lasitca (AIN); W WO	Zheng (CHN)		

Doubles

Athlete	Event	Round of 32	Round of 16	Quarterfinals	Semifinals	Final	
Athlete	Event	Opposition Score	Opposition Score	Opposition Score	Opposition Score	Opposition Score	Rank
Aaryan Humaney; Dhananjay Dubey	Men	Imai / Tamamitsu (JPN); L 1–2	Did not advance to next round				
Arshit; Prithvi Sekhar (5)	Men	—N/a	Abramov / Dolzhenkov (AIN); L 0–2	Did not advance to next round			
Bhavani Kedia; Jafreen Shaik (2)	Women	—N/a		Miyagawa / Sugimoto (JPN)			

== See also ==
- India at the Deaflympics
