= Mahit Sandhu =

Indian sports shooter (born 2004)

Personal information
- Born: 4 July 2004 (age 21) Dhippanwali, Punjab, India

Sport
- Country: India
Medal record
Representing India
Women's shooting
Deaflympics
Gold medal – first place	2025 Tokyo	50 m rifle three positions
Gold medal – first place	2025 Tokyo	Mixed 10 m air rifle
Silver medal – second place	2025 Tokyo	10 m air rifle
Silver medal – second place	2025 Tokyo	50 m prone rifle

Mahit Sandhu (born 4 July 2004) is an Indian deaf sports shooter who competes in rifle events. She made her Deaflympic debut at the age of 21 representing India at the 2025 Summer Deaflympics, winning four medals.

== Career ==
In September 2024, Sandhu competed in four events at the World Deaf Shooting Championship. She won the silver medal in the women's 10m air rifle event. She won a gold medal in the 10m mixed air rifle event alongside Dhanush Srikanth. She also competed in the 50 m prone rifle and rifle three positions, where she also won the gold medal in both of these events.

Sandhu competed in four shooting events at the 2025 Summer Deaflympics. She had won the gold medal in the mixed 10 m air rifle and 50 m prone rifle events. She also competed in the 10 m air rifle and 50 m rifle three positions events, in which she won the silver medal in both events.

== See also ==
- India at the Deaflympics
