= Shooting at the 2025 Summer Deaflympics =

Deaflympics event

- Venue: Ajinomoto National Training Center, Japan
- Dates: 16–25 November 2025

Shooting sports at the 2025 Summer Deaflympics was held at the Ajinomoto Training Centre in Tokyo, Japan from 16 to 25 November 2025.

13 medal events were held, consists of six men's events, five women's events and two mixed events.

== Medal table ==
* Host nation (Japan)

Rank	NOC	Gold	Silver	Bronze	Total
1	India	7	6	3	16
2	South Korea	2	4	3	9
3	Ukraine	2	1	2	5
4	Germany	1	1	0	2
5	Czech Republic	1	0	0	1
6	Chinese Taipei	0	1	0	1
7	Hungary	0	0	2	2
7	Iran	0	0	2	2
9	Croatia	0	0	1	1
Totals (9 entries)		13	13	13	39

== Medalists ==
=== Men ===
Event	Gold	Silver	Bronze
10 metre air pistol	Kim Tae-young; South Korea	Abhinav Deshwal; India	Boris Gramnjak; Croatia
10 metre air rifle	Dhanush Srikanth; India	Murtaza Vania; India	Baek Seung-hak; South Korea
25 metre rapid fire pistol	Lee Seung hwa Lee; South Korea	Serhii Ohorodnyk; Ukraine	Kim Tae-hwang; South Korea
25 metre pistol	Abhinav Deshwal; India	Lee Seung-hwa; South Korea	Serhii Fomin; Ukraine
50 metre three positions	Erik Matthias Hess; Germany	Shourya Saini; India	Dmytro Petrenko; Ukraine
50 metre rifle prone	Dmytro Petrenko; Ukraine	Colin Daniel Mueller; Germany	Kushagra Rajawat; India

=== Women ===
Event	Gold	Silver	Bronze
10 metre air pistol	Anuya Prasad; India	Pranjali Dhumal; India	Mahla Samiee; Iran
10 metre air rifle	Violeta Lykova; Ukraine	Mahit Sandhu; India	Komal Waghmare; India
25 metre pistol	Pranjali Dhumal; India	Halyna Mosina; Ukraine	Jeon Jiwon; South Korea
50 metre three positions	Mahit Sandhu; India	Jeong Da-in; South Korea	Mira Biatovszki; Hungary
50 metre rifle prone	Eliska Svobodova; Czech Republic	Mahit Sandhu; India	Mira Biatovszki; Hungary

=== Mixed ===
Event	Gold	Silver	Bronze
10 metre air pistol	India; Abhinav Deshwal; Pranjali Dhumal	Chinese Taipei; Kao Ya-Ju; Hsu Ming-Jui	Iran; Bijan Ghaffari; Mahla Samiee
10 metre air rifle	India; Dhanush Srikanth; Mahit Sandhu	South Korea; Kim Woo-rim; Jeong Da-in	India; Murtaza Vania; Komal Waghmare
