= Golf at the 2025 Summer Deaflympics =

- Venue: Wakasu Golf Links, Kōtō, Tokyo
- Location: Tokyo, Japan
- Dates: 18-21 November 2025

The golf competition took place from Tuesday, November 18th to Friday, November 21st at Wakasu Golf Links in Tokyo, Japan.

Three medal events were held: men's individual, women's individual and a mixed team event. The individual competitions were played over three rounds of 18 holes (54 holes), followed by a single-round mixed team stroke play competition.

India's Diksha Dagar won the women's individual gold medal, successfully defending the Deaflympics title she first won in 2021, while Germany's Allen John won the men's individual event. Canada won gold in the mixed team competition.

== Background ==
The 2025 Summer Deaflympics are the 25th edition of the Summer Deaflympics and were awarded to Tokyo, Japan, with the Games staged from 15 to 26 November 2025. Golf is one of the 18 sports on the programme in Tokyo.

Golf has been part of the modern Summer Deaflympics program intermittently and was also contested at the 2017 and 2021 Summer Deaflympics. Tokyo 2025 marked the first time the event included a mixed team competition at the Summer Deaflympics level, alongside the men's and women's individual stroke-play events.

== Venue ==
All events were played at Wakasu Golf Links in Tokyo’s Kōtō ward. The course is an 18-hole seaside layout on reclaimed land facing Tokyo Bay and is operated as a public facility by the Tokyo metropolitan authorities.

The Deaflympics competition used the course in stroke-play format, with tee times arranged in three-ball groups for the individual events and four-player pairings for the mixed team event.

== Competition format ==
The golf competitions in Tokyo 2025 were conducted in accordance with the Rules of Golf issued by The R&A and the United States Golf Association (USGA), as adopted for Deaflympics play by the International Committee of Sports for the Deaf. The general format was as follows:

- Individual events (men, women): 54-hole stroke play, played over three consecutive days (18 holes per day). Final rankings were determined by the aggregate score over the three rounds. In the event of a tie for medal positions, a play-off in stroke play was provided for in the regulations.
- Mixed team event: one-round mixed team stroke play held on 21 November 2025. Each team consisted of two golfers (one man and one woman) from the same National Olympic Committee (NOC). Team scores were calculated by adding the individual 18-hole scores of both players, with the lowest combined score winning the event. Ties were decided by a play-off.

Communication with athletes during suspensions of play (for example due to lightning) and restarts, which are normally announced by audible signals, was instead provided through visual methods such as flags and boards, in line with Deaflympics adaptations for deaf and hard-of-hearing participants.

== Schedule ==
According to the official Games schedule, the golf events were held over four competition days:

- 18 November 2025 – Individual, men: round 1; Individual, women: round 1
- 19 November 2025 – Individual, men: round 2; Individual, women: round 2
- 20 November 2025 – Individual, men: round 3 (final); Individual, women: round 3 (final)
- 21 November 2025 – Mixed team stroke-play event

All rounds were played in daytime sessions at Wakasu Golf Links. Times were scheduled in Japan Standard Time (UTC+9).

== Participation ==
The final results lists recorded 41 men (including one disqualification) and 21 women completing or starting the individual competitions. Players represented a wide range of national deaf sports federations from Africa, the Americas, Asia, Europe and Oceania, including Germany, India, Canada, the United States, France, Japan, Australia, Brazil, Kenya and others.

== Medal summary ==
* Host nation (Japan)

Rank	NOC	Gold	Silver	Bronze	Total
1	Germany	1	1	2	4
2	Canada	1	0	1	2
3	India	1	0	0	1
4	France	0	1	0	1
4	United States	0	1	0	1
Totals (5 entries)		3	3	3	9

=== Medalists ===
Event	Gold	NOC	Silver	NOC	Bronze	NOC
Men's individual	Allen John	Germany	Kevin Hall	United States	Nico Guldan	Germany
Women's individual	Diksha Dagar	India	Margaux Brejo	France	Erica Dawn Rivard	Canada
Mixed team	Russell Bowie; Erica Dawn Rivard	Canada	Allen John; Vanessa Girke	Germany	Nico Guldan; Stefanie Mayer	Germany

== Results ==
=== Men’s individual ===
The men’s individual event was decided over three rounds (54 holes). Germany’s Allen John won the gold medal with a total score of 205 strokes, 11 under par (66–70–69). Kevin Hall of the United States took silver at 214 (–2), and Germany’s Nico Guldan won bronze with 215 (–1). The top 10 final positions were:

Rank	Player	NOC	Score	R1	R2	R3
1	Allen John	Germany	−11 (205)	66	70	69
2	Kevin Hall	United States	−2 (214)	73	72	69
3	Nico Guldan	Germany	−1 (215)	74	68	73
4	James McGowin Miller	United States	+4 (220)	73	75	72
5	Russell Bowie	Canada	+9 (225)	79	77	69
6	Paul Daniel Waring	United Kingdom	+10 (226)	71	81	74
7	Hiroyuki Maejima	Japan	+11 (227)	76	76	75
8	Richard Pavel	Czech Republic	+14 (230)	74	78	78
9	Alexandre Ouellet	Canada	+16 (232)	73	81	78
10	Justin Pono Tokioka	United States	+18 (234)	79	76	79

A total of 40 players recorded final scores, with one additional player listed as disqualified in the final results.

=== Women’s individual ===
The women’s individual event also comprised three rounds of stroke play. India’s Diksha Dagar led from the opening round and finished with an aggregate of 205 (–11), winning by 14 strokes. Margaux Brejo of France claimed silver at 219 (+3), and Canada’s Erica Dawn Rivard took bronze with 221 (+5).

The top 10 final positions were:

Rank	Player	NOC	Score	R1	R2	R3
1	Diksha Dagar	India	−11 (205)	68	65	72
2	Margaux Brejo	France	+3 (219)	73	73	73
3	Erica Dawn Rivard	Canada	+5 (221)	76	76	69
4	Vanessa Girke	Germany	+12 (228)	77	76	75
5	Erica Pressley	United States	+23 (239)	80	77	82
6	Lydia Beth Ingman	United Kingdom	+26 (242)	81	81	80
T7	Yuna Tsuji	Japan	+27 (243)	80	76	87
T7	Sasha Gagnon-Laoun	Canada	+27 (243)	78	76	89
T9	Hyojeong Shin	Australia	+32 (248)	85	80	83
T9	Stefanie Mayer	Germany	+32 (248)	87	77	84
T9	Ashlyn Grace Johnson	United States	+32 (248)	78	84	86

Twenty-one players completed the three rounds in the women’s event.

=== Mixed team ===
The mixed team competition was held as a single 18-hole stroke-play round on 21 November 2025. Each team comprised one male and one female golfer from the same country, and their individual scores were combined to produce the team total.

Canada’s team of Russell Bowie and Erica Dawn Rivard won the gold medal with a combined score of 70 (–2). Germany won silver through the pairing of Allen John and Vanessa Girke at level par 72, while another German pair, Nico Guldan and Stefanie Mayer, secured bronze with 73 (+1) after a play-off against the United States team of James McGowin Miller and Ashlyn Grace Johnson, who also shot 73 in regulation play.

The full mixed team standings were:

Rank	Team	Players	NOC	Score
1	Canada	Russell Bowie; Erica Dawn Rivard	Canada	−2 (70)
2	Germany	Allen John; Vanessa Girke	Germany	E (72)
3	Germany	Nico Guldan; Stefanie Mayer	Germany	+1 (73)*
4	United States	James McGowin Miller; Ashlyn Grace Johnson	United States	+1 (73)*
5	India	Vibhu Tyagi; Diksha Dagar	India	+2 (74)
6	Great Britain	Paul Daniel Waring; Lydia Beth Ingman	United Kingdom	+5 (77)
7	United States	Kevin Hall; Erica Pressley	United States	+6 (78)
8	Japan	Hiroyuki Maejima; Yuna Tsuji	Japan	+8 (80)
T9	Japan	Nobuyuki Fuchi; Rie Nakajima	Japan	+9 (81)
T9	Australia	Ben Clifford; Hyojeong Shin	Australia	+9 (81)
11	Canada	Alexandre Ouellet; Sasha Gagnon-Laoun	Canada	+11 (83)
12	Norway	Ole Røren; Andrea Hovstein Hjellegjerde	Norway	+12 (84)
13	Great Britain	Aiden Silman-Kelly; Karen Patricia Ellam	United Kingdom	+14 (86)
14	Australia	Mark Aird; Linda Marchesi	Australia	+15 (87)
15	South Africa	Charles Williams; Gail Jean Klichowicz	South Africa	+19 (91)
16	Kenya	Isaac Ogolla Makokha; Jecinta Njeri Kungu	Kenya	+23 (95)
17	Mexico	Alfonso Balderas Torres; Maria Guadalupe Govea Vargas	Mexico	+33 (105)

- Decided by play-off.

== See also ==
- Golf at the 2017 Summer Deaflympics
- Golf at the 2021 Summer Deaflympics
- Golf at the Summer Olympics
