= Jerlin Anika =

Indian badminton player

Jerlin Anika Jayaratchagan
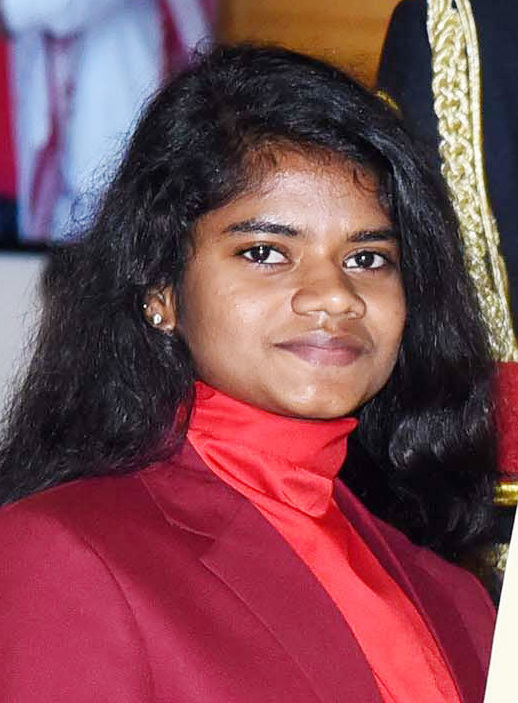

Personal information
- Born: 2004 (age 21–22)

Sport
- Country: India
Medal record
Representing India
Women's badminton
Deaflympics
| Gold medal – first place | Caxias do Sul 2021 | singles |
| Gold medal – first place | Caxias do Sul 2021 | mixed doubles |
| Gold medal – first place | Caxias do Sul 2021 | team |

Jerlin Anika Jayaratchagan also simply known as either J. Jerlin Anika or Jerlin Anika (born 2004) is an Indian deaf badminton player.

== Biography ==
She hails from Madurai, Tamil Nadu. She was diagnosed with hearing disability at the age of two. She studied at Avvai Corporation GHSS in Madurai and college at Lady Doak in Madurai..She pursued her interest in badminton at the age of eight. She took part in the Federation of India School Games 2016 while still being enrolled as a class IX student in St.Joseph's Girls Higher Secondary School and bagged silver medal in U-13 category. According to her coach, T. Saravanan, she had a disadvantage of reaction time to the shuttle.

== Career ==
She became a national champion at the 2017 badminton championship in Hyderabad and her performance helped her to qualify for the Summer Deaflympics in the same year. She represented India at the 2017 Summer Deaflympics at the age of 13 and contested in the women's singles and women's doubles events. At the age of 13, she was also the youngest participant at the 2017 Summer Deaflympics. She along with Prithvi Sekhar subsequently became the first set of athletes from Tamil Nadu to compete at Deaflympics.

She competed at the 2018 Asia Pacific Deaf Badminton Championships which was held in Malaysia where she secured two silver medals and a bronze. At the 5th Asia Pacific Deaf Badminton Championships, she clinched the bronze medal in the senior category in the women's doubles following it up with silver medal achievements in singles and doubles events in U-21 girls category.

She won gold medal at the age of 15 in the girls' singles final during the 2019 World Deaf Youth Badminton Championships which was held in Taipei. She defeated Germany's Finja Rosendahl in straight sets to become a youth deaf world champion. In addition to the gold medal feat, she also secured silver medals in girls' doubles and mixed doubles events during the second edition of the World Deaf Youth Badminton Championships in 2019.

She represented India at the 2021 Summer Deaflympics (held in May 2022) which marked her second appearance at the Deaflympics. She clinched three gold medals at the 2021 Summer Deaflympics in the mixed doubles, team event and women's singles events. She was awarded the Arjuna award in 2022, the second-highest sporting honour of India.

== See also ==
- India at the Deaflympics
