= Table tennis at the 2025 Summer Deaflympics =

- Venue: Tokyo Metropolitan Gymnasium, Japan
- Dates: 18-24 November 2025

Table tennis at the 2025 Summer Deaflympics was held at the Tokyo Metropolitan Gymnasium in Tokyo, Japan from 18 to 24 November 2025.

7 medal events were held, consists of three men's events, three women's events and one mixed event.

== Medal table ==
* Host nation (Japan)

Rank	NOC	Gold	Silver	Bronze	Total
1	China (CHN)	6	5	4	15
2	Slovakia (SVK)	1	0	0	1
3	Chinese Taipei (TPE)	0	1	2	3
3	Japan (JPN)*	0	1	2	3
5	Ukraine (UKR)	0	0	4	4
6	Philippines (PHI)	0	0	1	1
6	Poland (POL)	0	0	1	1
Totals (7 entries)		7	7	14	28

== Medalists ==
Event	Gold	Silver	Bronze
Men's singles	Thomas Keinath; Slovakia	Wang Cong; China	Cayl Brent Chavez; Philippines
Men's singles	Thomas Keinath; Slovakia	Wang Cong; China	Tian Jiping; China
Men's doubles	China; Wang Cong; Tian Jiping	China; Lin Quan; Niu Zeming	Chinese Taipei; Kuo Yueh-Tung; Lu Shih-Chieh
Men's doubles	China; Wang Cong; Tian Jiping	China; Lin Quan; Niu Zeming	Chinese Taipei; Yang Jung-Tsung; Wang Yi-Hsiang
Women's singles	Sun Buyao; China	Shi Ce; China	Wang Zhe; China
Women's singles	Sun Buyao; China	Shi Ce; China	Karyna Zavinovska; Ukraine
Women's doubles	China; Shi Ce; Sun Buyao	China; Wang Zhe; Wang Yutong	Japan; Yamada Moemi; Yamada Mizue
Women's doubles	China; Shi Ce; Sun Buyao	China; Wang Zhe; Wang Yutong	Ukraine; Roksolana Budnyk; Karyna Zavinovska
Mixed doubles	China; Wang Cong; Wang Zhe	China; Tian Jiping; Wang Yutong	China; Lin Quan; Shi Ce
Mixed doubles	China; Wang Cong; Wang Zhe	China; Tian Jiping; Wang Yutong	China; Niu Zeming; Sun Boyao
Men's team	China	Chinese Taipei	Japan; Kazakhstan
Women's team	China	Japan	Poland; Ukraine
