= Allen John =

German professional golfer

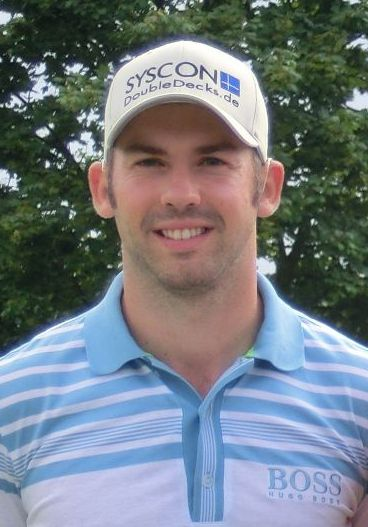
- John in 2011

Personal information
- Nationality: Germany
- Born: 31 August 1987 (age 39) Ludwigshafen, Germany
- Height: 1.80 m (5 ft 11 in)
- Weight: 90 kg (198 lb)

Career
- Sport: Golf
- College: Georgia State University
- Turned professional: 2011, (Note: Amateur status reinstated in 2016.) 2018
- Current tours: Sunshine Tour; Pro Golf Tour
- Former tour: Challenge Tour
- Professional wins: 4
Medal record
Deaflympics
Gold medal – first place	2017 Samsun	Individual
Gold medal – first place	2021 Caxias Do Sul	Individual
Gold medal – first place	2025 Tokyo	Individual

Allen John (born 31 August 1987) is a German professional golfer. He is profoundly deaf. He became a professional golfer in 2011 and played on the Challenge Tour in 2012. He was re-instated as an amateur in 2016. He represented Germany at the 2017 Summer Deaflympics when golf was included in the Summer Deaflympics for the first time and competed in the men's individual golf event securing a gold medal. Since 2018, John has returned to the professional ranks.

== Career ==
John has been playing golf since the age of ten. He also joined the German national golf team despite being deaf in 2003 after playing for various local and regional teams in Germany. He also attended the Georgia State University and claimed the Freshman of the Year award at the University. John emerged as the champion in the men's golf individual competition at the 2017 Summer Deaflympics after claiming his first Deaflympic medal in his maiden appearance at the Deaflympics representing Germany.

John tied for second at the 2018 Porsche European Open, but could not accept his €170,000 prize because of his amateur status.

== Amateur wins ==
- 2005 German Boys Open

== Professional wins (4) ==
=== Pro Golf Tour wins (3) ===
No.	Date	Tournament	Winning score	Margin of victory	Runner(s)-up
1	18 May 2011	Haugschlag NÖ Open	−14 (64-71-67=202)	Playoff	(Germany) Sebastian Bühl
2	31 May 2018	Raiffeisen Pro Golf Tour St. Pölten (as an amateur)	−15 (65-66-67=198)	2 strokes	(Poland) Mateusz Gradecki, (Germany) Gregory Wiggins (a)
3	10 Apr 2019	Open Michlifen	−11 (68-67-70=205)	3 strokes	(Germany) Moritz Lampert

=== Other wins (1) ===
- 2016 Memorial Olivier Barras (as an amateur)

== Team appearances ==
- European Boys' Team Championship (representing Germany): 2005
- European Youths' Team Championship (representing Germany): 2006
- Eisenhower Trophy (representing Germany): 2018
- European Amateur Team Championship (representing Germany): 2008, 2009
