= Satish Kumar (disambiguation) =

Satish Kumar is Indian activist and editor.

Satish Kumar may also refer to:

- Satish Kumar (athlete), Indian athlete
- Satish Kumar (boxer) (born 1989), Indian boxer
- Satish (criminal) or Satish Kumar, Indian serial killer
