= Anuya Prasad =

Indian sports shooter (born 2006)

Personal information
- Born: 17 November 2006 (age 19) Jaipur, Rajasthan, India

Sport
- Country: India
Medal record
Representing India
Women's shooting
Deaflympics
Gold medal – first place	2025 Tokyo	10m air pistol

Anuya Prasad (born 17 November 2006) is an Indian deaf sports shooter who competes in pistol events. She made her Deaflympic debut at the age of 19 representing India at the 2025 Summer Deaflympics, winning a gold medal.

== Career ==
In September 2024, Prasad competed in the World Deaf Shooting Championship and won a gold medal in the women's 10m air pistol event. She had posted a score of 10.3 last shot to defeat Sofia Olenych by 0.1 point. She also competed in the 25 m pistol, where she finished in fifth place.

Prasad competed at the 2025 Summer Deaflympics and clinched a gold medal in the women's 10m air pistol shooting event, registering a score of 241.1 points in the final, finishing ahead of compatriot Pranjali Dhumal. This occurred on her nineteenth birthday. She then competed with Rudar Kumar in the mixed air pistol event, where they finished in seventh place. Prasad also competed in the 25 m pistol event, in which she finished in fourth place and was won by Dhumal.

== See also ==
- India at the Deaflympics
