= Tennis at the 2021 Summer Deaflympics =

Deaflympics event

- Venue: Recreio da Juventude
- Location: Brazil, Caxias Do Sul
- Dates: 3–12 May

Tennis at the 2021 Summer Deaflympics was held in Caxias Do Sul, Brazil from 3 to 12 May 2022.

== Medal summary ==
* Host nation (Brazil)

Rank	NOC	Gold	Silver	Bronze	Total
1	Czech Republic (CZE)	2	0	0	2
2	Chinese Taipei (TPE)	1	2	1	4
3	Germany (GER)	1	1	1	3
4	France (FRA)	1	0	0	1
5	India (IND)	0	1	2	3
6	Hungary (HUN)	0	1	0	1
7	Italy (ITA)	0	0	1	1
Totals (7 entries)		5	5	5	15

== Medalists ==
Event	Gold	Silver	Bronze
Men's singles	Jaroslav Smedek; Czech Republic	Gabor Mathe; Hungary	Prithvi Sekhar; India
Men's doubles	France (FRA); Mikael Laurent; Vincent Novelli	India (IND); Dhananjay Dubey; Prithvi Sekhar	Germany (GER); Cedric Kaufmann; Nils Rohwedder
Women's singles	Heike Albrecht-Schroeder; Germany	Chia-Wen Lin; Chinese Taipei	Chiu-Mei Ho; Chinese Taipei
Women's doubles	Chinese Taipei (TPE); Chiu-Mei Lin; Chiu-Mei Ho	Germany (GER); Verena Fleckenstein; Heike Albrecht-Schroeder	Italy (ITA); Cristina Abrami; Giulia Bassini
Mixed doubles	Czech Republic (CZE); Katerina Blascikova; Jaroslav Smedek	Chinese Taipei (TPE); Chia-Wen Lin; Chun-Wei Wang	India (IND); Prithvi Sekhar; Jafreen Shaik
