= Vedika Sharma =

Indian sports shooter (born 2003)

Personal information
- Born: 2003 (age 22–23)

Sport
- Country: India
Medal record
Women's shooting
Representing India
Deaflympics
Bronze medal – third place	Caxias do Sul 2021	10m air pistol

Vedika Sharma (born 2003) is an Indian deaf sports shooter. She made her Deaflympic debut at the age of 19 representing India at the 2021 Summer Deaflympics (held in May 2022).

== Career ==
She competed at the 2021 Summer Deaflympics and clinched a bronze medal in the women's 10m air pistol shooting event with a score of 207.2 in the final.

== See also ==
- India at the Deaflympics
