= India at the Deaflympics =

- IPC code: IND
- NPC: All India Sports Council of the Deaf
- Website: www.aiscd.org
- Medals Ranked 23rd: Gold 35 Silver 16 Bronze 21 Total 72

Summer appearances
- 1924; 1928; 1931; 1935; 1939; 1949; 1953; 1957; 1961; 1965; 1969; 1973; 1977; 1981; 1985; 1989; 1993; 1997; 2001; 2005; 2009; 2013; 2017; 2021

India first participated at the Deaflympics in 1965. The country won its first Deaflympic medal at the 1981 Summer Deaflympics in Cologne, where Satish Kumar secured a silver medal in the 25 km event and a bronze medal in the 10,000 m athletics event. India later won its first gold medal at the 1989 Summer Deaflympics in badminton, when Sandeep Singh Dhillon secured a gold medal in men’s badminton doubles.

Indian athletes have won a total of 72 medals, all at the Summer Games. India's best performance came at the 2025 Summer Deaflympics in Tokyo, where India won 20 medals, including nine gold and seven silver.

== History ==
India became affiliated with the International Committee of Sports for the Deaf in 1963 through the All India Federation of the Deaf, which was established in 22 December 1955. The All India Sports Council of the Deaf, established in 1965 as the federation’s sports wing, later assumed responsibility for managing India’s participation in the Deaflympics. As of 2024, the AISCD has affiliations with a total of 24 National Sports Federations.

== Deaflympic overview ==
India began participating in the Deaflympics since the 1965 Summer Deaflympics.

=== 1965 Summer Deaflympics ===
India sent a delegation to compete at the 1965 Summer Deaflympics in Washington, D.C., United States which took place from June 27 to July 3, 1965. It was the nation's debut appearance at the Deaflympics. The delegation consisted of seven athletes competing in athletics, table tennis and tennis.

=== 1981 Summer Deaflympics ===
India sent six athletes to compete at the 1981 Summer Deaflympics in Cologne, Germany which took place from July 23 to August 1, 1981. India won its first Deaflympics medals at the Games. Satish Kumar secured a silver medal in the 25 km event and a bronze medal in the 10,000 m athletics event.

=== 1989 Summer Deaflympics ===
India sent ten athletes to compete at the 1989 Summer Deaflympics in Christchurch, New Zealand. India won its first Deaflympics gold medal at the 1989 Summer Deaflympics in Christchurch, New Zealand in badminton. Sandeep Singh Dhillon won gold in the men’s doubles event.

=== 1993 Summer Deaflympics ===
India sent a delegation of 29 athletes to compete at the 1993 Summer Deaflympics in Sofia,Bulgaria. which took place from 24 July 1993 to 2 August 1993. India won seven medals, including five gold and two bronze medals, and finished eighth in the medal table. This was an increase from the three medals won at the 1989 Summer Deaflympics and represented India’s highest medal tally at the event up to that time.

=== 2009 Summer Deaflympics ===
India sent a delegation of 24 athletes to compete at the 2009 Summer Deaflympics in Taipei,Taiwan , which took place from 5 to 15 September 2009. Virender Singh won India's only medal. He won a bronze medal in wrestling.

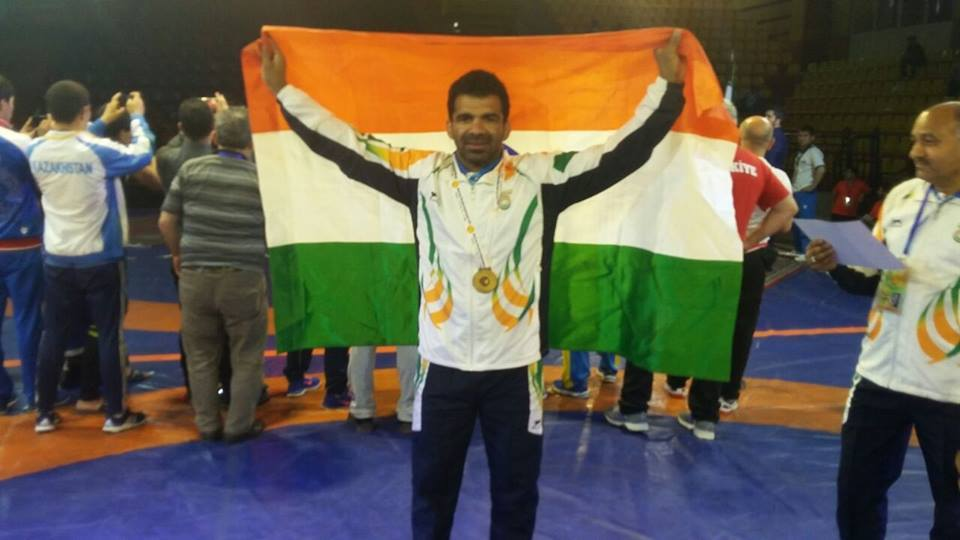
Virender Singh won a gold medal in wrestling in 2013 Deaflympics

=== 2013 Summer Deaflympics ===
India sent a delegation of 35 athletes to compete at the 2013 Summer Deaflympics in Sofia,Bulgaria, which took place from July 26 to August 4, 2013. Virender Singh won India's only medal. He won a gold medal in wrestling.

=== 2017 Summer Deaflympics ===
India sent a delegation of 46 athletes to compete at the 2017 Summer Deaflympics in Samsun,Turkey, which took place from July 18 to July 30, 2017. Indian athletes claimed 5 medals in the event including a gold medal and 2 bronze medals. Diksha Dagar claimed a silver medal in the women's individual event in golf ,which made its debut at the 2017 Summer Deaflympics. Prithvi Sekhar and Jafreen Shaik won a bronze medal in Tennis (mixed doubles).

=== 2021 Summer Deaflympics ===
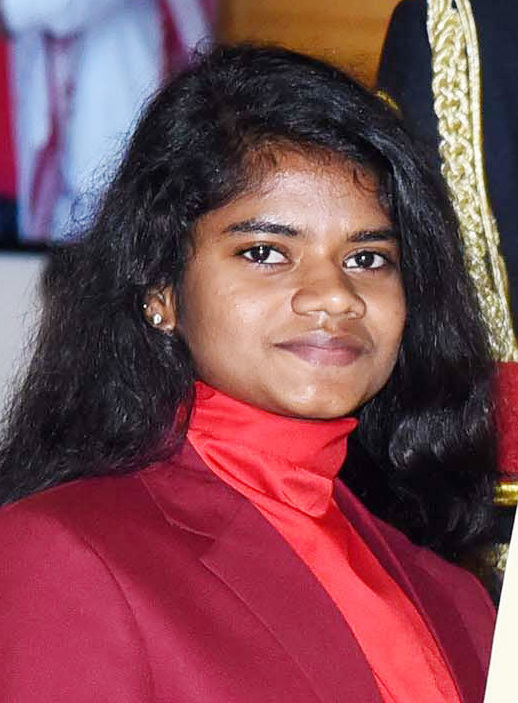
Jerlin Anika won three gold medals at the 2021, making her the first Indian woman to win multiple medals in one Deaflympics.

India achieved one of its best performances at the 2021 Summer Deaflympics held in 2022 in Caxias do Sul, Brazil. India won 16 medals including 8 gold medals, and finishing among the top ten countries in the medal table. Jerlin Anika won 3 gold medals, making her the first Indian woman Deaflympian to win multiple medals in one Games. Diksha Dagar won India's first gold medal in golf. Dhanush Srikanth won gold, Shourya Saini won bronze in Men's 10m air rifle shooting event.

=== Breakthrough at the 2025 Deaflympics in Tokyo ===
India recorded its best-ever performance at the 2025 Summer Deaflympics in Tokyo. India won 20 medals, including 9 gold and achieved the 6th rank, which is the highest position in the overall medal table.

Loma Swain secured India’s first-ever Deaflympics medal in Karate, winning bronze in the Women's Kumite 50kg. Diksha Dagar successfully defended her gold Medal by winning the event by a record-breaking 14-stroke margin.

==== Dominance of shooting at the 2025 Deaflympics ====
At the 2025 Summer Deaflympics held in Tokyo, shooting turned out to be the most successful sport for the Indian contingent during the Deaflympic Games.

Indian shooters won 16 medals, including 7 gold, 6 silver, and 3 bronze medals. This was the highest number of medals won by India in any single sport at the competition.

Mahit Sandhu was India's most successful shooter with 4 medals (2 gold, 2 silver), including Gold in the Women's 50m Rifle 3 Positions and Mixed 10m Air Rifle Team. Dhanush Srikanth won gold in the Men's 10m Air Rifle with a Deaf Final World Record (252.2) and gold in the Mixed 10m Air Rifle Team. Abhinav Deshwal secured 3 medals (2 gold, 1 silver), winning gold in the Men's 25m Pistol and Mixed 10m Air Pistol Team. Pranjali Dhumal clinched 3 medals (2 gold, 1 silver), winning Gold in the Women's 25m Pistol. Anuya Prasad won gold in the Women's 10m Air Pistol with a World Record Deaflympic score. Mohammed Murtaza Vania won silver in the 10m Air Rifle (Men) and a bronze in the 10m Air Rifle Team (Mixed). Kushagra Singh Rajawat won bronze at the 50m Rifle Prone (Men) .

== Medal count ==
India has won a total of 72 medals at the Summer Deaflympics since its debut in 1965.

Games	Gold	Silver	Bronze	Total	Rank
1924 Paris	Did not participate				
1928 Amsterdam	Did not participate				
1931 Nuremberg	Did not participate				
1935 London	Did not participate				
1939 Stockholm	Did not participate				
1949 Copenhagen	Did not participate				
1953 Brussels	Did not participate				
1957 Milan	Did not participate				
1961 Helsinki	Did not participate				
1965 Washington DC	0	0	0	0	–
1969 Belgrade	Did not participate				
1973 Malmö	0	0	0	0	–
1977 Bucharest	0	0	0	0	–
1981 Cologne	0	2	1	3	21st
1985 Los Angeles	0	0	1	1	21st
1989 Christchurch	2	1	0	3	
1993 Sofia	5	0	2	7	8th
1997 Copenhagen	3	3	1	7	15th
2001 Rome	3	0	0	3	15th
2005 Melbourne	3	1	3	7	
2009 Taipei	0	0	1	1	
2013 Sofia	1	0	0	1	
2017 Samsun	1	1	2	4	26th
2021 Caxias do Sul	8	1	7	16	9th
2025 Tokyo	9	7	4	20	6th

== Total athletes ==
Host city	Male	Female	Total	References
1965 Washington DC	7	0	7	
1969 Belgrade	Did not participate			
1973 Malmö	8	0	8	
1977 Bucharest	3	0	3	
1981 Cologne	6	0	6	
1985 Los Angeles	10	3	13	
1989 Christchurch	10	0	10	
1993 Sofia	24	5	29	
1997 Copenhagen	18	2	20	
2001 Rome	4	5	9	
2005 Melbourne	26	17	43	
2009 Taipei	19	5	24	
2013 Sofia	20	15	35	
2017 Samsun	27	19	46	
2021 Caxias do Sul	38	26	64	
2025 Tokyo	45	28	73	

== Milestones ==
Milestones	Medalist	Games	Sport	Medals	Ref.
First Medalist	Satish Kumar	1981 Cologne	Athletics	(silver) Silver	
First individual medalist	Satish Kumar	1981 Cologne	Athletics	(silver) Silver	
First Gold medalist	Sandeep Singh Dhillon	1989 Christchurch	Badminton	(gold) Gold	
First individual gold medalist	Sandeep Singh Dhillon	1989 Christchurch	Badminton	(gold) Gold	
First woman Medalist	Sonu Anand Sharma	1997 Copenhagen	Badminton	(gold) Gold	
First multi-medalist	Virender Singh	2005 Melbourne	Wrestling	(gold) Gold	
First multi-medalist	Virender Singh	2009 Taipei	Wrestling	(bronze) Bronze	
First multi-medalist	Virender Singh	2013 Sofia	Wrestling	(gold) Gold	
First multi-medalist	Virender Singh	2017 Samsun	Wrestling	(gold) Gold	
First multi-medalist	Virender Singh	2021 Caxias do Sul	Wrestling	(bronze) Bronze	
First woman multi-medalist	Diksha Dagar	2017 Samsun	Golf	(silver) Silver	
First woman multi-medalist	Diksha Dagar	2021 Caxias do Sul	Golf	(gold) Gold	

== Medals by sport ==
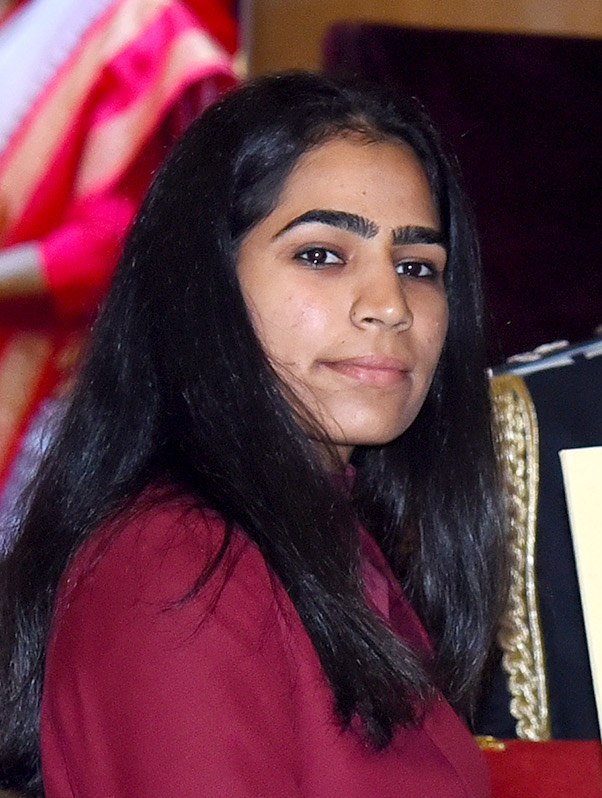
Diksha Dagar, India's only multiple gold medalist in golf.

Sport	(gold) Gold	(silver) Silver	(bronze) Bronze	Total
Badminton	17	2	5	24
Shooting	10	6	5	21
Wrestling	5	1	3	9
Golf	2	1	0	3
Athletics	1	5	3	9
Tennis	0	1	3	4
Table tennis	0	0	1	1
Karate	0	0	1	1

== See also ==
- India at the Olympics
- India at the Paralympics
- India at the Asian Games
- Deaflympics
