= Pranjali Dhumal =

Indian sports shooter (born 2000)

Personal information
- Born: 2000 (age 25–26) India

Sport
- Country: India
Medal record
Representing India
Women's shooting
Deaflympics
Gold medal – first place	2025 Tokyo	25 m pistol
Gold medal – first place	2025 Tokyo	Mixed 10m air pistol
Silver medal – second place	2025 Tokyo	10m air pistol

Pranjali Prashant Dhumal (born 2000) is an Indian deaf sports shooter. She made her Deaflympic debut in 2022, representing India at the 2021 Summer Deaflympics.

== Career ==
In May 2022, Dhumal competed at the delayed 2021 Summer Deaflympics, where she competed in the women's and mixed 10 m air pistol events, finishing in fourth place in the former.

In September 2024, Dhumal competed in the World Deaf Shooting Championship and finished in fourth place in the women's 10m air pistol event and posted a score of 568 during qualification. She also competed in the 25 m pistol, where she posted a score of 571 during qualification and won the bronze medal.

Dhumal competed at the 2025 Summer Deaflympics and clinched a silver medal in the women's 10m air pistol shooting event, registering a score of 236.8 points in the final, finishing behind compatriot Anuya Prasad. She then competed with Abhinav Deshwal in the mixed air pistol event, where they won the gold medal, as well as the 25 m pistol event, in which she won the gold medal.
