= India at the 2021 Summer Deaflympics =

India at the 2022 Deaflympics
- IOC code: IND
- NOC: All India Sports Council of the Deaf
- Website: www.aiscd.org

in Caxias do Sul
- Competitors: 65
- Medals Ranked 8th: Gold 8 Silver 1 Bronze 8 Total 17

Summer appearances
- 1924; 1928; 1931; 1935; 1939; 1949; 1953; 1957; 1961; 1965; 1969; 1973; 1977; 1981; 1985; 1989; 1993; 1997; 2001; 2005; 2009; 2013; 2017; 2021

India competed at the 2021 Summer Deaflympics which was held in Caxias do Sul, Brazil. India sent a delegation consisting of 65 participants in 11 sporting disciplines such as shooting, badminton, athletics, golf, judo, karate, table tennis, tennis, taekwondo, wrestling for the event, which was the largest ever delegation sent by India in a single Summer Deaflympic event.

This was the 14th time that India had participated at the Summer Deaflympics since making its Deaflympic debut in 1965. The delegation included Rohit Bhaker, who competed in his 7th Deaflympic event as the most experienced competitor for India at the multi-sport event. Golfer Diksha Dagar who competed at the 2020 Summer Olympics also returned to Deaflympics after appearing previously at the 2017 Summer Deaflympics.

India rank 9th in the event which includes Sports shooter Dhanush Srikanth won the first medal as well as first gold medal for India during the event as he clinched a gold medal in the men's 10m air rifle shooting event with a new deaf world record by registering a score of 247.5 points in the final.

== Medalists ==
Name	Medal	Sport	Event
Jerlin Anika	Gold	Badminton	Women Singles
Abhinav Sharma; Jerlin Anika	Gold	Badminton	Mixed Doubles
Rohit Bhaker; Mahesh	Gold	Badminton	Mixed Team
Diksha Dagar	Gold	Golf	Women's Individual
Dhanush Srikanth	Gold	Shooting	Men's 10m air rifle
Abhinav Deshwal	Gold	Shooting	Men's 10m air pistol
Dhanush Srikanth; Priyesha Deshmukh	Gold	Shooting	Mixed rifle
Sumit Dahya	Gold	Wrestling	Men's Freestyle (97 kg)
Prithvi Sekhar; Dhananjay Dubey	Silver	Tennis	Men's Doubles
Abhinav Sharma	Bronze	Badminton	Men's Singles
Vedika Sharma	Bronze	Shooting	Women's 10m air pistol
Shourya Saini	Bronze	Shooting	Men's 10m air rifle
Prithvi Sekhar	Bronze	Tennis	Men's Singles
Prithvi Sekhar; Jafreen Shaik	Bronze	Tennis	Mixed Doubles
Virender Singh	Bronze	Wrestling	Men's Freestyle (74 kg)
Amit Krishan	Bronze	Wrestling	Men's Freestyle (86 kg)

== Medal table ==
Sport	Gold	Silver	Bronze	Total
Badminton	3	0	1	4
Golf	1	0	0	1
Shooting	3	0	2	5
Tennis	0	1	2	3
Wrestling	1	0	2	4
Total	8	1	7	16

== See also ==
- India at the Deaflympics
