= Tütem Banguoğlu =

Turkish tennis player (born 1985)

- Country (sports): Turkey
- Born: 2 January 1985 (age 41) İzmir, Turkey
Medal record
Women's tennis
Representing Turkey
Summer Deaflympics
Bronze medal – third place	2017 Samsun	Women's Doubles

Tütem Banguoğlu (born 2 January 1985) is a Turkish tennis player who competes also in doubles and mixed team events.

== Sport career ==
Banguoğlu started her tennis career in 2011 with the encouragement of her trainer, and continued with the moral and financial support of her father. Between 2012 and 2022, she won several times champions and runners-up titles at the Turkish Championships. She trains in the tennis courts at Kültürpark in İzmir. She has been a member of the national deaf tennis team since 2012.

She competed in the Singles, Doubles and Mixed Doubles tennis events at the Summer Deaflympics in 2013 Sofia, 2017 Samsun, 2021 Caxias do Sul and 2025 Tokyo . At the 2017 Samsun Deaflympics, she won the bronze medal in the doubles event with her teammate Asuman Şakı defeating Parul Gupta and Madju Jaiswal from India. This was Turkey's first ever medal in the Tennis at the Deaflympics.

At the 2021 European Deaf Tennis Championship in Hersonissos, Greece, she and her teammate placed fourth in the doubles with Naz Albayrak.

== Personal life ==
Tütem Banguoğlu was born in İzmir, Turkey on 2 January 1985. She is congenitally hearing impaired.

She graduated from the Ceramics Department at Ege University in her hometown.
