= Shi Ce =

Chinese table tennis player

Personal information
- Born: 15 December 1985 (age 40) Yichun, Heilongjiang, China

Sport
- Sport: Table tennis
Medal record
Representing China
Women's Table tennis
Event / 1st / 2nd / 3rd; World Deaf Table tennis Championship / 4 / 0 / 0; WDTTC
World Deaf Table tennis Championship
Gold medal – first place	2008	singles
Gold medal – first place	2008	doubles
Gold medal – first place	2008	mixed doubles
Gold medal – first place	2008	team
Event / 1st / 2nd / 3rd; Deaflympics / 13 / 4 / 1
Deaflympics
Gold medal – first place	2005 Melbourne	singles
Gold medal – first place	2005 Melbourne	doubles
Gold medal – first place	2005 Melbourne	mixed doubles
Gold medal – first place	2009 Taipei	doubles
Gold medal – first place	2009 Taipei	team
Gold medal – first place	2013 Sofia	doubles
Gold medal – first place	2013 Sofia	mixed doubles
Gold medal – first place	2013 Sofia	team
Gold medal – first place	2017 Samsun	doubles
Gold medal – first place	2017 Samsun	mixed doubles
Gold medal – first place	2017 Samsun	team
Gold medal – first place	2025 Tokyo	doubles
Gold medal – first place	2025 Tokyo	team
Silver medal – second place	2005 Melbourne	team
Silver medal – second place	2009 Taipei	mixed doubles
Silver medal – second place	2017 Samsun	singles
Silver medal – second place	2025 Tokyo	singles
Bronze medal – third place	2025 Tokyo	mixed doubles

Shi Ce (Chinese: 史册; born 15 December 1985) is a Chinese deaf female table tennis player. She has represented China at the Deaflympics four times from 2005 to 2017. Shi Ce has been regarded as one of the finest athletes to have represented China at the Deaflympics, having won 14 medals at the event since making her debut in the 2005 Summer Deaflympics.

== Biography ==
Shi Ce was born in Yichun, Heilongjiang on 15 December 1985. She was born with an ear condition that impaired her hearing which resulted in her deafness and has congenital malformation in her right ear. Her parents decided to consult a doctor and took her to an hospital in the Zhejiang Province in order to cure her ear impairment when she was just five years old. The doctor suggested that surgery would cause facial paralysis after Shi Ce's parents demanded for a surgery. Shi Ce took the sport of Table tennis and started playing it at the age of nine.

== Career ==
Shi Ce has won 14 medals in her Deaflympic career as a Table tennis player including 11 gold medals. Shi Ce was eligible to compete at the National Games of China despite her deafness, in 2005. In the competition, she secured gold medals in singles, doubles, mixed doubles and in the team events.

=== 2005 Summer Deaflympics ===
Shi Ce made her first appearance at an international sports event during the 2005 Summer Deaflympics and excelled on her debut Deaflympic event after winning gold medals in the women's singles, doubles and in the mixed doubles. She was also the part of the Chinese Table tennis team which secured the silver medal in the 2005 Deaflympics.

In the same year, she received the Deaf Sportswoman of the Year award from the ICSD for her remarkable performances at the 2005 Summer Deaflympics. Shi Ce was rated with 83 points in the women's category at the 2005 Widex Sportsman and Sportswoman Award Ceremony.

=== 2009 Summer Deaflympics ===
She continued her medal hunt at the Deaflympics as she won the gold medals in the women's doubles and team events at the 2009 Summer Deaflympics.

=== 2013 Summer Deaflympics ===
In the 2013 Summer Deaflympics, she bagged gold medals in the women's doubles, women's mixed doubles and in the women's team events.

=== 2017 Summer Deaflympics ===
She continued her dominance at the Deaflympics, winning gold medals in the doubles, mixed doubles and team events. She also secured the women's singles silver medal after emerging as runners-up to a compatriot Meng Peng Huang

== See also ==
- China national table tennis team
