= Basketball at the 2025 Summer Deaflympics =

- Venue: Ota City General Gymnasium, Japan
- Dates: 16–25 November 2025

Basketball at the 2025 Summer Deaflympics was held from 16 to 25 November 2025 at Ota City General Gymnasium in Tokyo, Japan.

Two medal events were held, consists of both men and women events.

== Medal table ==
* Host nation (Japan)

Rank	NOC	Gold	Silver	Bronze	Total
1	United States	1	1	0	2
2	Japan*	1	0	0	1
3	Ukraine	0	1	1	2
4	Greece	0	0	1	1
Totals (4 entries)		2	2	2	6

== Medalists ==
Event	Gold	Silver	Bronze
Men	United States; Jory Valencia; Preston Kelly; Michael Hays-Lizarraga; Jon Mowl; Noah Valencia; Andy Cruz; Raymond Nelson; Blessed Mbogo; Patrick Danen; Derek Keels; Stuart Jones; Keanu Boren	Ukraine; Oleksandr Fomenko; Vitalii Bykov; Ivan Dudar; Dmytro Vasylenko; Oleksandr Levanovych; Oleksandr Didenko; Pavlo Riazantsev; Yaroslav Stryzhak; Danylo Bychkovyi; Pavlo Bondarenko; Andrii Raus; Yevhen Brechko	Greece; Elisaios Koskinas; Christos Gkanatsas; Ektoras Mitsonis; Michail Glynis; Panagiotis Ntikoudis; Panagiotis Vaiopoulos; Rafail Petalas; Ioannis Vavatsikos; Apollon Deligeorgis; Georgios Tsagkaroulis; Aimilios Milios; Damianos Konstantaras
Women	Japan; Juri Hashimoto; Rin Toyozato; Marina Hada; Nanami Wada; Makoto Kawashima; Yuzu Wakamatsu; Miharu Kotaka; Saya Numaguchi; Shino Kato; Shiki Kato; Ayane Fujita; Kaori Maruyama	United States; Nukeitra Hayes; Sunita Schmidjorg; Rajena Guettler; Cassidy Perry; Tawnecia Rush; Alyssa Wells; Claire Ruiz-Tucker; Graci Dietrich; Hannah Puent; Cheyenne Talbot; Emelia Beldon; Kaela Zapadinsky	Ukraine; Polina Solodovnyk; Tetiana Kulinok; Kseniia Afanasieva; Oleksandra Semenchuk; Anastasiia Kostohlod; Olena Khoroshykh; Anna Sivakova; Sofiia Shvaika; Kateryna Chernysh; Olena Ogorodnikova

== Results ==
=== Men ===
A: UKR-ISR-JPN-ARG

B: POL-VEN-LTU-TPE

C: USA-GRE-AUS-CAN

QF:

UKR 89-33 AUS

GRE 65-61 VEN

USA 83-50 LTU

ISR 74-67 POL

SF:

UKR 60-43 GRE

USA 76-68 ISR

3rd place match:

GRE 78-67 ISR

Final:

USA 69-59 UKR

=== Women ===
A: ITA-LTU-AUS-KEN

B: JPN-UKR-GRE

C: USA-POL-TUR-TPE

QF:

USA 64-46 GRE

ITA 56-44 POL

JPN 98-53 AUS

UKR 69-42 LTU

SF:

USA 80-52 ITA

JPN 62-57 UKR

3rd place match:

UKR 70-57 ITA

Final:

JPN 65-64 USA
