= Golf at the 2021 Summer Deaflympics =

Deaflympics event

- Venue: Golf Club Caxias do Sul
- Location: Brazil, Caxias Do Sul
- Dates: 7–11 May

Golf at the 2021 Summer Deaflympics in Caxias Do Sul was held at the Golf Club Caxias do Sul in Caxias Do Sul from 7 to 11 May 2022.

== Medal summary ==
* Host nation (Brazil)

Rank	NOC	Gold	Silver	Bronze	Total
1	Germany (GER)	1	0	0	1
1	India (IND)	1	0	0	1
3	Canada (CAN)	0	1	0	1
3	United States (USA)	0	1	0	1
5	France (FRA)	0	0	1	1
5	Kenya (KEN)	0	0	1	1
Totals (6 entries)		2	2	2	6

== Medalists ==
Event	Gold	Silver	Bronze
Men	Allen John; Germany	Russel Bowie; Canada	Isaac Makokha; Kenya
Women	Diksha Dagar; India	Ashlyn Johnson; United States	Margaux Brejo; France
