= Tennis at the 2017 Summer Deaflympics =

Deaflympics event

Tennis at the 2021 Summer Deaflympics
- Venue: Samsun Tennis Club
- Location: Turkey, Samsun
- Dates: 19–28 July

Tennis at the 2017 Summer Deaflympics took place at the Samsun Tennis Club in Canik.

== Medal summary ==
* Host nation (Turkey)

Rank	NOC	Gold	Silver	Bronze	Total
1	Chinese Taipei (TPE)	2	0	1	3
2	France (FRA)	1	2	0	3
3	Russia (RUS)	1	1	1	3
4	Czech Republic (CZE)	1	0	0	1
5	Ecuador (ECU)	0	1	0	1
5	Germany (GER)	0	1	0	1
7	Austria (AUT)	0	0	1	1
7	India (IND)	0	0	1	1
7	Turkey (TUR)*	0	0	1	1
Totals (9 entries)		5	5	5	15

== Medalists ==
Event	Gold	Silver	Bronze
Men's singles	Jaroslav Smedek; Czech Republic	Andres Sebastian Vazquez; Ecuador	Egor Alexandrovich Panyushkin; Russia
Men's doubles	France; Mikael Alix Laurent, Vincent Novelli	Germany; Urs Ferdinand Breitenberger, Hans Toedter	Austria; Robert Gravogl, Mario Kargl
Women's singles	Lin Chia-Wen; Chinese Taipei	Polina Smirnova; Russia	Ho Chiu-mei; Chinese Taipei
Women's doubles	Chinese Taipei; Ho Chiu-mei; Lin Chia-Wen	France; Marine Beney; Aurelie Coudon	Turkey; Tütem Banguoğlu; Asuman Şakı
Mixed doubles	Russia; Egor Alexandrovich Panyushkin, Polina Smirnova	France; Aurelie Coudon, Vincent Novelli	India; Shaik Jafreen, Prithvi Sekhar
