= Golf at the 2017 Summer Deaflympics =

Deaflympics event

- Venue: Samsun Golf Course
- Location: Samsun, Turkey
- Dates: 21 to 26 July 2017
- Competitors: 28 from 13 nations

Golf at the 2017 Summer Deaflympics in Samsun was held at the Samsun Golf Course in Atakum from 21 to 26 July 2017.

== Medal summary ==
* Host nation (Turkey)

Rank	NOC	Gold	Silver	Bronze	Total
1	Germany (GER)	1	0	0	1
1	United States (USA)	1	0	0	1
3	Great Britain (GBR)	0	1	1	2
4	India (IND)	0	1	0	1
5	Norway (NOR)	0	0	1	1
Totals (5 entries)		2	2	2	6

== Medalists ==
Event	Gold	Silver	Bronze
Men	Allen John; Germany	Paul Daniel Waring; Great Britain	Steven James John Cafferty; Great Britain
Women	Kaylin Yost; United States	Diksha Dagar; India	Andrea Hjellegjerde; Norway

== Participating nations ==
- Denmark (1)
- Finland (2)
- Great Britain (2)
- Germany (4)
- Ghana (2)
- India (2)
- Kenya (1)
- Netherlands (1)
- Norway (1)
- Russia (3)
- Slovakia (1)
- Turkey (6)
- United States (2)
