= Orienteering at the 2025 Summer Deaflympics =

- Venue: Hibiya Park, Chiyoda; Izu Ōshima Geopark
- Dates: 15-23 November 2025

Orienteering at the 2025 Summer Deaflympics was held at the Hibiya Park and Izu Ōshima Geopark in Tokyo, Japan from 15 to 23 November 2025.

Nine medal events were held, consists of four men's events, three women's events and two mixed events.

== Medal table ==
* Host nation (Japan)

Rank	NOC	Gold	Silver	Bronze	Total
1	Ukraine	7	5	3	15
2	Lithuania	1	1	3	5
3	Finland	1	0	0	1
4	Sweden	0	2	0	2
5	Hungary	0	1	2	3
6	Czech Republic	0	0	1	1
Totals (6 entries)		9	9	9	27

== Medal summary ==
=== Men ===
Event	Gold		Silver		Bronze	
Sprint distance	Nazar Levytskyi; Ukraine	12:57	Dmytro Levin; Ukraine	13:54	Volodymyr Fodoseienko; Ukraine	14:00
Middle distance	Volodymyr Fodoseienko; Ukraine	34:05	Ferenc Mihalyi; Hungary	36:44	Mikalojus Makutenas; Lithuania	39:26
Long distance	Nazar Levytskyi; Ukraine	1:15:42	Nils Rundström; Sweden	1:23:28	Rokas Koveckis; Lithuania	1:23:49
Relay	Ukraine	1:44:01	Sweden	2:17:07	Hungary	2:31:42

=== Women ===
Event	Gold		Silver		Bronze	
Sprint distance	Anna Vanasaun; Ukraine	11:57	Hanna Fedosieieva; Ukraine	12:16	Hanna Androsovych; Ukraine	12:40
Middle distance	Iana Melnyk; Ukraine	46:24	Hanna Androsovych; Ukraine	50:47	Marie Pangracova; Czech Republic	52:42
Long distance	Gedvile Dirziute; Lithuania	1:24:10	Iana Melnyk; Ukraine	1:24:41	Hanna Fedosieieva; Ukraine	1:27:33

=== Mixed ===
Event	Gold		Silver		Bronze	
Super sprint relay	Finland; Juuso Toivonen; Sara-Elise Ruokonen	25:13	Ukraine; Nazar Levytskyi; Hanna Fodosieieva	25:15	Lithuania; Rokas Koveckis; Gedvile Dirziute	25:29
Sprint relay	Ukraine; Dmytro Plakhotnik; Dmytro Levin; Anna Vanasaun; Iana Melnyk	48:22	Lithuania; Rokas Koveckis; Mikalojus Makutenas; Gedvile Dirziute; Adrija Atgalaine	48:31	Hungary; Nikolett Szucs; Imre Boros; Szabolcs Bojtor; Nora Szabo	48:22
