= Asuman Şakı =

Turkish tennis player (born 1988)

- Country (sports): Turkey
- Born: 1988 (age 37–38) Turkey
Medal record
Women's tennis
Representing Turkey
Summer Deaflympics
Bronze medal – third place	2017 Samsun	Women's Doubles

Asuman Şakı (born 1988) is a Turkish tennis player who competes also in doubles and mixed team events.

== Sport career ==
In January 2017, Şakı took three gold medals at the Turkish Championship held in İzmir, including in the senior singles, doubles with Beste Mürşitoğlu and mixed doubles with İsmail Hakkı Yılmaz.

She competed in the Singles, Doubles and Mixed Doubles tennis events at the Summer Deaflympics in 2009 Taipei, 2013 Sofia and 2017 Samsun. At the 2017 Samsun Deaflympics, she won the bronze medal in the doubles event with her teammate Tütem Banguoğlu defeating Parul Gupta and Madju Jaiswal from India. This was Turkey's first ever medal in the Tennis at the Deaflympics.

She was selected to the national team for the 2025 European Pickleball Championship in Rome, Italy.

== Personal life ==
Asuman Şakı was born in 1988.
