= India at the 2017 Summer Deaflympics =

India at the 2017 Deaflympics
- IOC code: IND
- NOC: All India Sports Council of the Deaf
- Website: www.aiscd.org

in Samsun
- Competitors: 46
- Medals Ranked 26th: Gold 1 Silver 1 Bronze 3 Total 5

Summer appearances
- 1924; 1928; 1931; 1935; 1939; 1949; 1953; 1957; 1961; 1965; 1969; 1973; 1977; 1981; 1985; 1989; 1993; 1997; 2001; 2005; 2009; 2013; 2017; 2021

India competed in the 2017 Summer Deaflympics which was held in Samsun, Turkey. India sent a delegation consisting of 46 participants for the event.

This was the 13th time that India participated at the Summer Deaflympics since making its Deaflympic debut in 1965. The delegation included Rohit Bhaker, who competed in his 6th Deaflympic event as the most experienced competitor for India at the multi-sport event along with Virender Singh, who was competing in his 4th Deaflympic event. Indian delegation mainly dominated in the sport of wrestling including a solitary gold medal won by Virender Singh in the men's 74 kg category.

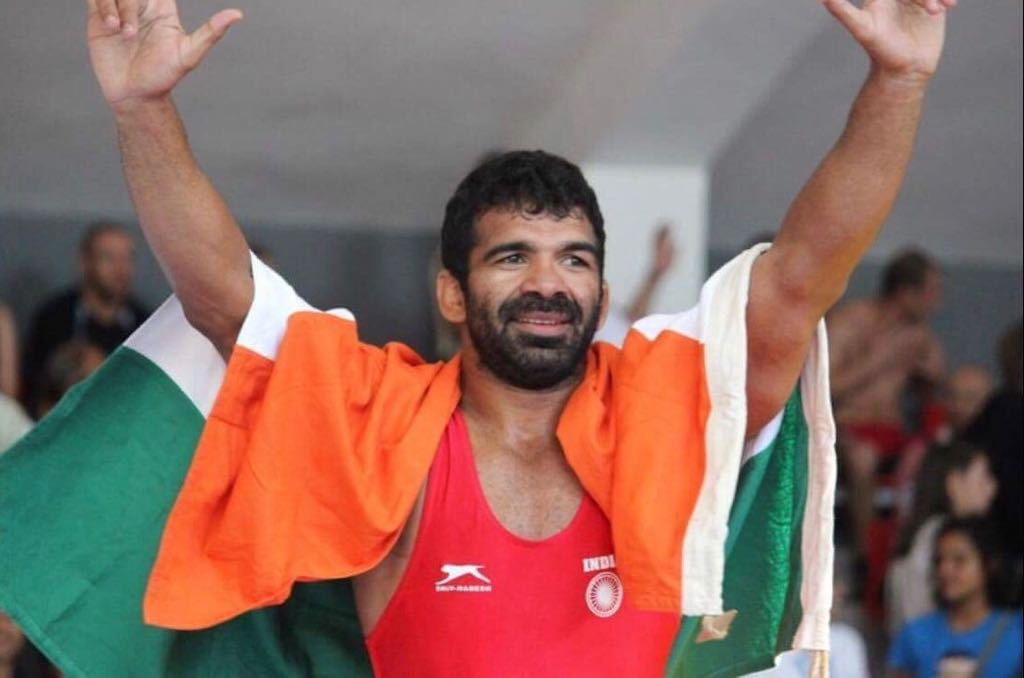
Virender Singh was the only gold medalist for India at the 2017 Deaflympics

Overall, Indian athletes claimed 5 medals in the event including a gold medal and 2 bronze medals in the men's wrestling categories. Amateur ladies golfer Diksha Dagar claimed a silver medal in the women's individual event as a part of the golf competition which made its debut at the 2017 Summer Deaflympics, in fact she also became the only Indian golfer to receive a Deaflympic medal.

== Criticism ==
The Indian medalists at the multi-sport event complained, argued and protested against the Indian government as the government failed to honour and recognise the achievements of the Indian wrestlers at the competition. Several critics revealed and criticized that only Olympic and Paralympic medal winners are honoured and recognised in India but not the Deaflympic participants and Deaflympic medal winners.

== Medalists ==
Name	Medal	Sport	Event
Virender Singh	Gold	Wrestling	Men's 74 kg freestyle
Diksha Dagar	Silver	Golf	Women's individual
Ajay Kumar	Bronze	Wrestling	Men's 64 kg freestyle
Sumit Dahiya	Bronze	Wrestling	Men's 97 kg freestyle
Prithvi Sekhar and Jafreen Shaik	Bronze	Tennis	mixed doubles

== Medal table ==
Sport	Gold	Silver	Bronze	Total
Wrestling	1	0	2	3
Golf	0	1	0	1
Tennis	0	0	1	1

== See also ==
- India at the Deaflympics
