= Isaac Makokha =

Kenyan golfer

Personal information
- Full name: Isaac Ogolla Makokha
- Nationality: Kenyan
- Born: 1991 (age 34–35)

Sport
- Country: Kenya
Medal record
Men's golf
Representing Kenya
Event / 1st / 2nd / 3rd; Deaflympics / 0 / 0 / 1
Deaflympics
Bronze medal – third place	Caxias do Sul 2021	individual

Isaac Ogolla Makokha (born 1991) is a Kenyan golfer. He has represented Kenya at the Deaflympics twice in 2017 and 2021.

== Career ==
Makokha made his Deaflympic debut representing Kenya in the 2017 Summer Deaflympics and competed in the men's golf individual event. He finished in sixth position. He earned his first Deaflympic medal at the 2021 Summer Deaflympics with a bronze medal in the men's golf individual event. It was reported that the Kenyan golfers, including Makokha, had only arrived in Brazil a day prior to the golf event due to delays in the processing of their visas. Makokha also became the first Kenyan to win a Deaflympic medal in golf.

Makokha was also named as one of the four golfers in the Kenyan contingent at the 2025 Summer Deaflympics.
