= Norway at the 2017 Summer Deaflympics =

Norway at the 2017 Deaflympics
- IOC code: NOR
- Website: www.doveidrett.no

in Samsun
- Competitors: 7
- Medals Ranked 29th: Gold 1 Silver 0 Bronze 1 Total 2

Summer appearances
- 1924; 1928; 1931; 1935; 1939; 1949; 1953; 1957; 1961; 1965; 1969; 1973; 1977; 1981; 1985; 1989; 1993; 1997; 2001; 2005; 2009; 2013; 2017; 2021

Norway competed in the 2017 Summer Deaflympics which was held in Samsun, Turkey. Norway sent a delegation consisting of 7 participants for the event. This was the 20th consecutive time that Norway participated at the Summer Deaflympics since making its Deaflympic debut in 1931.

Norwegian athletes claimed 2 medals in the event including a gold medal and a bronze medal. Trude Raad won the women's hammer throw event and broke her own world record in the women's hammer throw after claiming gold medal with a record time of 66.05

== Medalists ==
Name	Medal	Sport	Event
Trude Raad	Gold	Athletics	Women's hammer throw
Andrea Hjellegjerde	Bronze	Golf	Women's individual

== Medal table ==
Sport	Gold	Silver	Bronze	Total
Athletics	1	0	0	1
Golf	0	0	1	1
