= Shourya Saini =

Indian sports shooter (born 2003)

Personal information
- Born: 2003 (age 22–23)

Sport
- Country: India
Medal record
Men's shooting
Representing India
Deaflympics
| Bronze medal – third place | Caxias do Sul 2021 | 10m air rifle |
World Junior Championships
| Gold medal – first place | 2024 Lima | 50m rifle 3 position team |

Shourya Saini (born 2003) is an Indian deaf sports shooter. He made his Deaflympic debut at the age of 19 representing India at the 2021 Summer Deaflympics (held in May 2022).

== Career ==
He competed at the 2021 Summer Deaflympics and clinched a bronze medal in the men's 10m air rifle shooting event. Interestingly, the event was won by fellow Indian Dhanush Srikanth.

== See also ==
- India at the Deaflympics
