= Samsun Golf Course =

Golf course in Atakum, Samsun, Turkey

Samsun Golf Course Samsun Golf Sahası
- Location of the golf course in Turkey.
- 41°19′41″N 36°18′40″E

Club information
- Location: Atakum, Damsun, Turkey
- Established: July 15, 2016; 9 years ago
- Type: Public
- Owner: Samsun Metropolitan Municipality
- Operator: Turkish Golf Federation
- Tota holes: 9
- Tournaments: 2017 Summer Deaflympics

Samsun Golf Club (Turkish: Samsun Golf Sahası) is a nine-hole golf course located in the Atakum district of Samsun Province, northern Turkey. It was created for the 2017 Summer Deaflympics.

== Establishment ==
The golf course is situated in Denizevleri Mah., Adnan Menderes Boulevard 33 in Atakum, Samsun. Most of the area for the golf course, which initially covered 300 daa (74 acres), was obtained through filling a part of the seashore by rocks. Turkish media claim it to be first known golf course in the world built on a ground gained by filling the sea. It was established by the Metropolitan Municipality of Samsun. It was opened in the presence of the Minister of Foreign Affairs Mevlüt Çavuşoğlu and Minister of Youth and Sports Akif Çağatay Kılıç and with a "Federation Cup" tournament organized by the Turkish Golf Federation on July 15, 2016. Initially it had 9 holes. The golf course is a public venue. It hosted 250 professional golfers, and 85 people attended courses, in the first nine months of operation.

== Extension ==
In order to meet international standards set by USGA, an extension project was launched. The area of the golf course is being enlarged to 600 daa (150 acres), doubling its size and the number of holes to 18. For this purpose, a total of 2.5 million tons of rocks of size 2–6 tons were dumped into the sea. The area of the golf course has the form of a peninsula with a length of 2,100 m (6,900 ft). The landscape of the facility is designed by the American golf architect Kevın Ramsey. Being at a seaside location, the golf course is of links-style, as most common in Ireland, Great Britain and Scotland. The club building covers 3,000 m^{2} (32,000 sq ft) and features a fitness center and a restaurant. The 18-hole course is expected to be opened on July 18, 2018.

== International events hosted ==
This is the venue for the golf events of the 2017 Summer Deaflympics between July 20–26.
