= Diksha Dagar =

Indian professional golfer (born 2000)

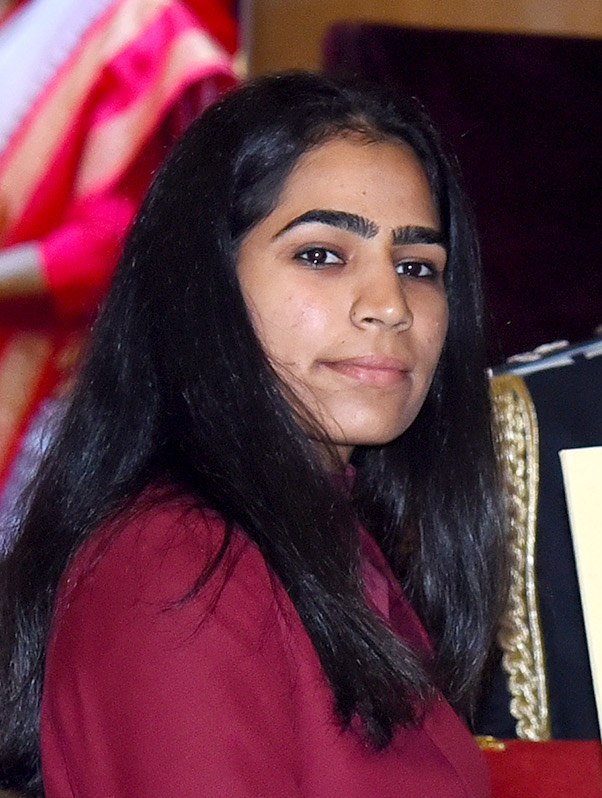
- Dagar in 2024

Personal information
- Nationality: India
- Born: 14 December 2000 (age 25) Chappar, Jhajjar, Haryana, India
- Height: 1.75 m (5 ft 9 in)

Career
- Sport: Golf
- Turned professional: 2019
- Current tour: Ladies European Tour
- Professional wins: 3

Number of wins by tour
- Ladies European Tour: 2
- Other: 1

Best results in LPGA major championships
- Chevron Championship: DNP
- Women's PGA C'ship: DNP
- U.S. Women's Open: DNP
- Women's British Open: T21: 2023
- Evian Championship: CUT: 2019, 2023
Medal record
Women's golf
Representing India
Deaflympics
Gold medal – first place	2021 Caxias do Sul	Individual
Gold medal – first place	2025 Tokyo	Individual
Silver medal – second place	2017 Samsun	Individual

Diksha Dagar (born 14 December 2000) is an Indian professional golfer who is also deaf. She is a two-time gold medallist at the Deaflympics. Dagar represented India at the 2018 Asian Games, and in 2019 became the second Indian female golfer, after Aditi Ashok, to win on the Ladies European Tour, achieving the feat at age 18 and becoming the youngest Indian woman to do so.

In July 2021, she received an invitation from the International Golf Federation to compete in the women's individual event at the 2020 Tokyo Olympics following a late withdrawal of South African golfer Paula Reto. With this, she became the first golfer in history to have competed in both the Olympics and the Deaflympics.

== Early life ==
Diksha was born on 14 December 2000 and started to wear hearing aids at the age of six. She started playing golf since the age of seven, along with her brother Yogesh Dagar, who is also profoundly deaf. She was coached by her father Col Narinder Dagar, a former scratch golfer who serves in the Army. She considers Serbian tennis player Novak Djokovic and American golfer Tiger Woods as her inspirational role models.

== Amateur career ==
She started playing golf as a left-hander in the amateur level in 2012 and noted for her clean long striking during her early career. In November 2015, she was the low amateur at the Hero Women's Indian Open on the Ladies European Tour. She has won several amateur golf professional tournaments since entering into amateur circuit in 2012. In 2016, she became the only Indian golfer to be ranked within top 500 in the world rankings for U18 category.

In 2017, she won her maiden professional event at the Hero Women's Pro Golf Tour. In March 2018, she won the Singapore Ladies Amateur Open. Diksha Dagar also registered the best score by an Indian at the Thailand's Queen Sirikit Cup history when she achieved it in June 2018 with a score of three under 69 and helped the Indian team to finish sixth in the women's team event. She also totalled four-under over the three days, the lowest any Indian had gone in the Queen Sirikit Cup history.

Diksha was one of the medal winners as a part of the Indian delegation at the 2017 Summer Deaflympics, where she clinched a silver medal in the women's individual golf event and also became the first Indian to claim a Deaflympic medal in the sport of golf.

In April 2018, she was approved to take part in the 2018 Asian Games along with six other golfers who were named in the Indian squad and competed in both women's individual and team event as a part of the golf competition.

== Professional career ==
Dagar turned professional in early 2019. In March 2019, she emerged as winner of the 2019 Investec South African Women's Open, a tournament on the 2019 Ladies European Tour. This was her first win as a professional, becoming India's youngest woman to clinch a Ladies European Tour title at the age of 18. She defeated South Africa's three-time champion, Lee-Anne Pace, by one shot. She became the first Indian to clinch the South African Women's Open title and second Indian female overall to claim the Ladies European Tour Title. In November 2020, she competed at the 2020 Dubai Omega Moonlight Classic tournament. During the 2020 Ladies Scottish Open, she along with two fellow Indian golfers Aditi Ashok and Tvesa Malik became the first trio of golfers from India to take part in a single event at the Ladies European Tour.

Diksha won the Aramco Team Series – London as part of the 2021 Ladies European Tour and became only the second Indian female golfer after Aditi Ashok to win Ladies European Tour more than once. She represented India at the 2020 Summer Olympics which also marked her maiden appearance at the Olympics. Prior to earning an invitation to take part in the Olympics, she was supposed to participate at the ISPS Handa World Invitational Tournament in the Northern Ireland which started on 29 July 2021. She became one of the fewest deaf people to have competed at the Olympics and she was also the first Indian deaf sportsperson to have represented India at the Olympics.

She qualified to compete at the 2021 Summer Deaflympics (held in May 2022) representing India which also marked her second Deaflympic appearance. She claimed the gold medal in the women's individual event during the 2021 Summer Deaflympics after defeating USA's Ashlyn Grace in the final. She also went onto become the first and only golfer in Deaflympics history to secure two Deaflympic medals in golf since the introduction of sport to Deaflympics in 2017.

== Honours ==
She was conferred the Arjuna Award for the year 2023. Earlier in 2020, the Indian Golf Union nominated her as a candidate for the Arjuna Award.

== Amateur wins ==
- 2015 Eastern India Ladies & Junior Girls - Faldo Series India
- 2016 Chandigarh Ladies & Junior Girls Championship, Faldo Series India Championship, Western India Ladies & Girls Championship, Eastern India Ladies & Junior Girls
- 2017 Telangana Ladies & Junior Girls Championship, Northern India Ladies & Girls, Western India Ladies & Girls Championship
- 2018 Singapore Ladies Amateur Open Championship

== Professional wins (3) ==
=== Ladies European Tour wins (2) ===
No.	Date	Tournament	Winning score	To par	Margin of victory	Runner-up
1	16 Mar 2019	Investec South African Women's Open^{[1]}	76-66-69=211	−5	1 stroke	(South Africa) Lee-Anne Pace
2	25 Jun 2023	Tipsport Czech Ladies Open	69-65-69=203	−13	4 strokes	(Thailand) Trichat Cheenglab

^{1} Co-sanctioned by the Sunshine Ladies Tour.

=== Other wins (1) ===
- 2017 Hero Women's Pro Golf Tour Leg 16

== Results in LPGA majors ==
Tournament	2019	2020	2021	2022	2023	2024	2025	2026
Chevron Championship								
U.S. Women's Open								
Women's PGA Championship								
The Evian Championship	CUT				CUT	WD		
Women's British Open	CUT	CUT		CUT	T21	CUT	T46	CUT

Did not play

CUT = missed the half-way cut
WD = withdrew
T = tied

== Team appearances ==
- Espirito Santo Trophy (representing India): 2016, 2018

== See also ==
- India at the Deaflympics
