= Abhinav Deshwal =

Indian sports shooter (born 2007)

Personal information
- Born: 2007 (age 18–19)

Sport
- Country: India
Medal record
Men's shooting
Representing India
Deaflympics
Gold medal – first place	Caxias do Sul 2021	10m air pistol
Gold medal – first place	Tokyo 2025	10m air pistol
Gold medal – first place	Tokyo 2025	Mixed 10m air pistol

Abhinav Deshwal (born 2007) is an Indian deaf sports shooter. He made his Deaflympic debut at the age of 15 representing India at the 2021 Summer Deaflympics (held in May 2022). He hails from Roorkee, Uttarakhand.

== Career ==
He competed at the 2021 Summer Deaflympics and clinched a gold medal in the men's 10m air pistol shooting event. He was initially tied with Ukraine's Oleksii Lazebnyk at 234.2 points apiece at the end of 24-shot final, before securing a gold medal in a shoot-off where he shot 10.3 in contrast to Lazebnyk's 9.7 mark. It was also India's second gold medal in shooting during the 2021 Summer Deaflympics.

== See also ==
- India at the Deaflympics
