= Gábor Máthé (tennis) =

Hungarian tennis player

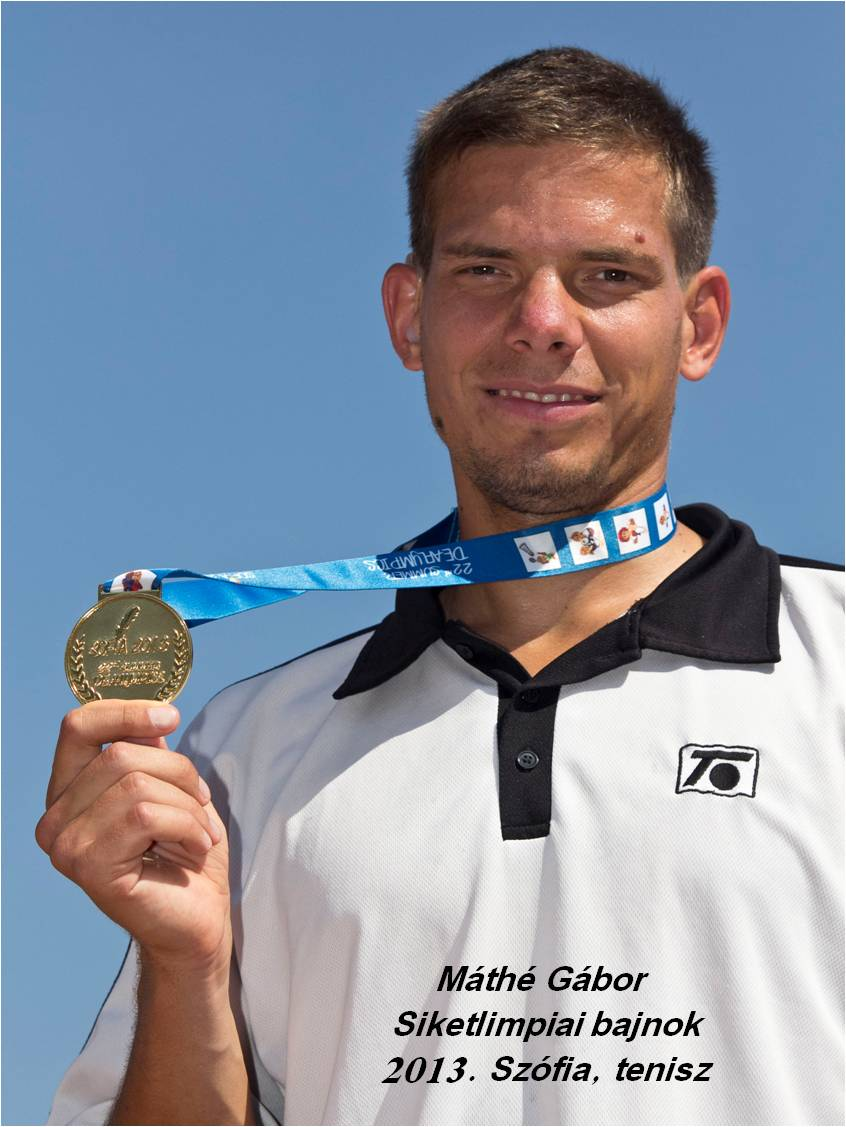
- Máthé at the 2013 Summer Deaflympics

Personal information
- Nationality: Hungarian
- Born: 2 July 1985 (age 41) Debrecen, Hungary
- Height: 1.88 m (6 ft 2 in)
Medal record
Men's Tennis
Representing Hungary
Summer Deaflympics
Gold medal – first place	2013 Sofia	Singles
Silver medal – second place	2021 Caxias Do Sul	Singles
Bronze medal – third place	2009 Taipei	Singles
Deaf European Championship men's tennis
Gold medal – first place	2008 Bucharest	Singles
Deaf Tennis World Cup men's tennis
Silver medal – second place	2010 Las Vegas	Singles
Gold medal – first place	2010 Las Vegas	Doubles
Silver medal – second place	2005 Kottingbrunn	Singles
Deaf Tennis British Open men's tennis
Gold medal – first place	2006 Nottingham	Singles
Gold medal – first place	2006 Nottingham	Doubles

Gábor Máthé (born 2 July 1985) is a Hungarian male tennis player, who competes in the men's single and double during his career. His team is Tatár Tennis Club in Debrecen, Hungary. He is best known for winning the men's single tennis final on 2 August at the 2013 Summer Deaflympics in Sofia, Bulgaria, with a three set victory over Mikaël Laurent from France.

== Results ==
- 2017 – Deaflympics, 5th (Men's Singles)
- 2013 – Deaflympics, Sofia. Gold(Men's Singles)
- 2012 – Hungarian Champion in double
- 2010 – Tennis Deaf World Cup, Las Vegas. Silver: single, Gold: double.
- 2009 – Deaflympics, Taipei. Bronze(Men's Singles)
- 2008 – European Deaf Tennis Championship, Bucharest. Gold
- 2006 – British Deaf Open Championships, Nottingham. Gold: single, Gold: double
- 2005 – Tennis Deaf World Cup, Austria. Silver
- 2004 – European Deaf Tennis Championship. 5-8th place
- 2001 – Deaflympics, Rome.(Men's Singles)
- 2000 – European Deaf Tennis Championship. In the 16.

Máthé started the 2013 Sofia Summer Deaflympics with wins over an Indian, an American and a German opponent. In the semifinal he met the Austrian Mario Kargl and won in straight sets. He culminated his run with a three set, three-hour-long win over Frenchman Mikaël Laurent to become Deaflympic Champion in tennis singles. He became champion without losing a set throughout the whole competition.

== Others ==
- 2009 – Fair Play Award winner Summer Deaflympics in Taipei
- 2008 – Sportsman of the Year Finalist
