= Ōi Futō Chūō Kaihin Park =

Park in Tokyo, Japan

Coordinates: 35.5949771°N 139.7520755°E

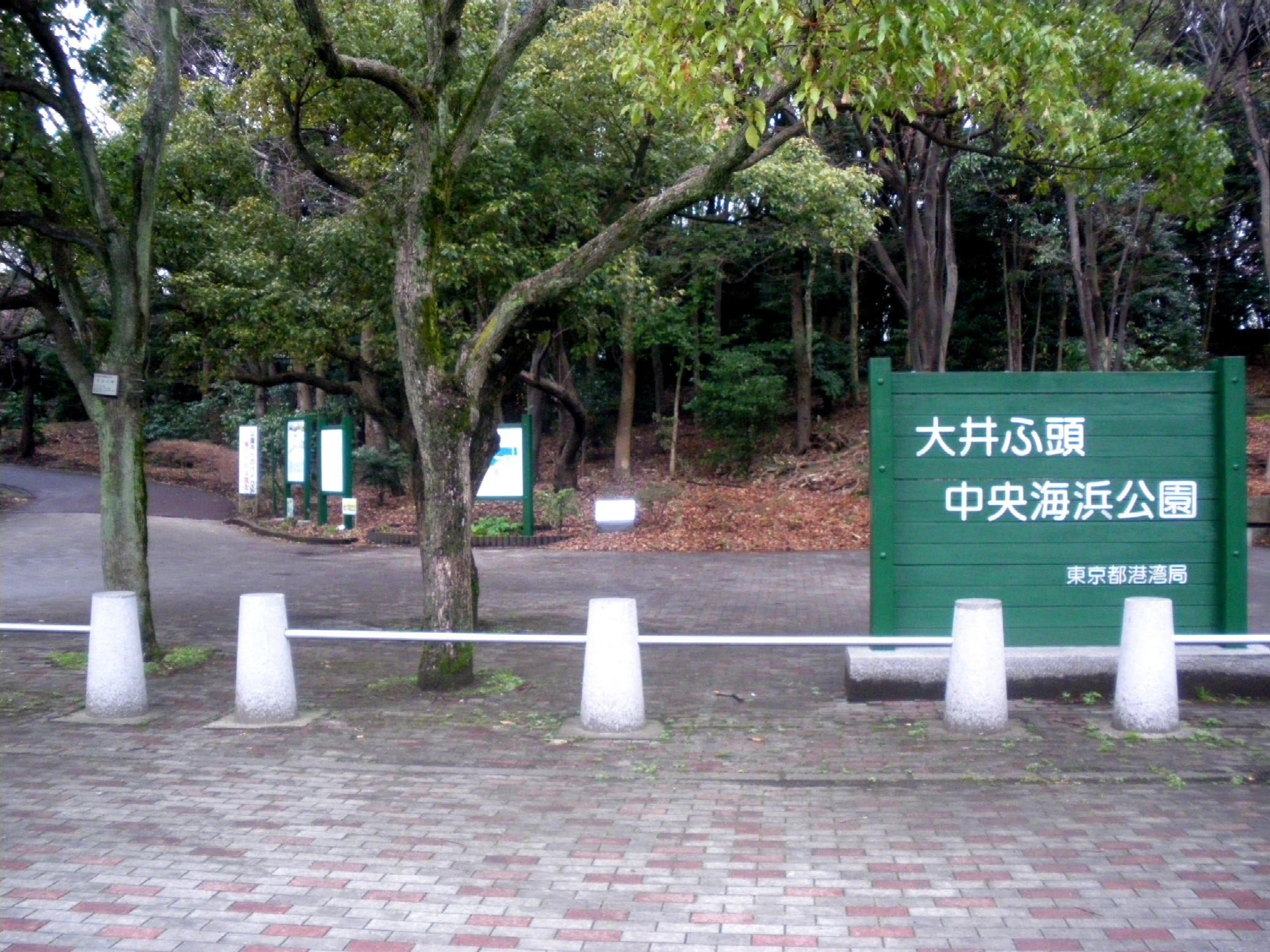
- Entrance to the park
- Interactive map of Ōi Futō Chūō Kaihin Park
- Location: Shinagawa Ward and Ōta Ward, Tokyo, Japan
- Area: 454,271 square metres (112.253 acres)
- Created: 1 April 1978
- Public transit: Shinagawa Station

Ōi Futō Chūō Kaihin Park (大井ふ頭中央海浜公園, Ōi Futō Chūō Kaihin Kōen) is a public park in Shinagawa Ward and Ōta Ward, Tokyo, Japan. About 69% of the park is in Shinagawa, with the remaining 31% in Ōta.

== Facilities ==
The park has an athletics stadium, baseball grounds, tennis courts and a gateball area.

== See also ==
- Parks and gardens in Tokyo
- National Parks of Japan
