= Prithvi Sekhar =

Indian tennis player

- Born: 3 October 1993 (age 32) Chennai, Tamil Nadu, India
- Plays: right-handed
Medal record
Men's Tennis
Representing India
Deaflympics
Silver medal – second place	Caxias do Sul 2021	men's doubles
Bronze medal – third place	Caxias do Sul 2021	men's singles
Bronze medal – third place	Caxias do Sul 2021	mixed doubles
Bronze medal – third place	Samsun 2017	mixed doubles

Prithvi Sekhar (born 3 October 1993) is an Indian male deaf tennis player. He represented India at the Deaflympics in 2013 and 2017. He won a bronze medal in the mixed doubles at the 2017 Summer Deaflympics partnering with Jafreen Shaik. He is also currently employed in the Integrated Coach Factory in Chennai.

== Biography ==
Prithvi started playing tennis from 2002 when he was just eight years old. He was actually left with two options either to choose cricket or tennis at the age of eight and he decided to choose the latter. He idolised tennis icons Novak Djokovic and Roger Federer.

== Early career ==
He went on to represent India at the 2013 Summer Deaflympics which was also his first Deaflympic appearance, but he did not win a medal. It was through his mother he managed to get to know about a tournament like Deaflympics of its stature. He was sent by his mother to take part in the national trials in 2013 which was held in Aurangabad where he proved his worth by claiming gold medals in both men's singles and men's doubles. Due to his notable performances, he was selected to the Indian contingent for 2013 Summer Deaflympics.

Prithvi was selected to compete for India at the 2017 Summer Deaflympics as India sent a delegation consisting of 46 participants for the multi-sport event. Prithvi Sekhar along with Jafreen Shaik claimed a historical bronze medal in the mixed doubles at the 2017 Summer Deaflympics, marking India's first ever Deaflympic medal in tennis.

== Rising up through ranks ==
He then became a prolific tennis player despite being deaf, improving his ratings in the ATP singles and doubles to be among the top ten deaf players. His first breakthrough in professional tennis circuit eventually came in May 2018 when he scored his first ATP point by winning a match at the International Tennis Federation World Tennis Tour which was held in China.

He won the men's singles world title at the 2019 World Deaf Tennis Championships after defeating Czech Republic's Jaroslav Smedek 6–4, 6–3 in straight sets in the men's final. He came into the 2019 World Deaf Tennis Championships unseeded. However, he defied the odds defeating four seeded players including top seed world no 1. Gabor Mathe of Hungary and then beating third seed Jaroslav Smedek in the final to claim his first world title. He also secured bronze medal in men's doubles event at 2019 World Championships.

He was also part of the Indian Railways team which claimed gold medal in the World Tennis Railway Championships in 2019 which was held in Bulgaria.

He made his second Deaflympic appearance during the 2021 Summer Deaflympics (held in May 2022) representing India and he claimed three medals in the competition. During the 2021 Summer Deaflympics, he teamed up with Dhananjay Dubey to claim silver in men's doubles event whereas he collaborated with Jafreen Shaikh to clinch bronze in mixed doubles. He also secured a bronze in men's singles event to increase his personal medal tally to three during the multi-sport event.

== See also ==
- India at the Deaflympics
