= Virender Singh (wrestler, born 1986) =

Indian freestyle wrestler

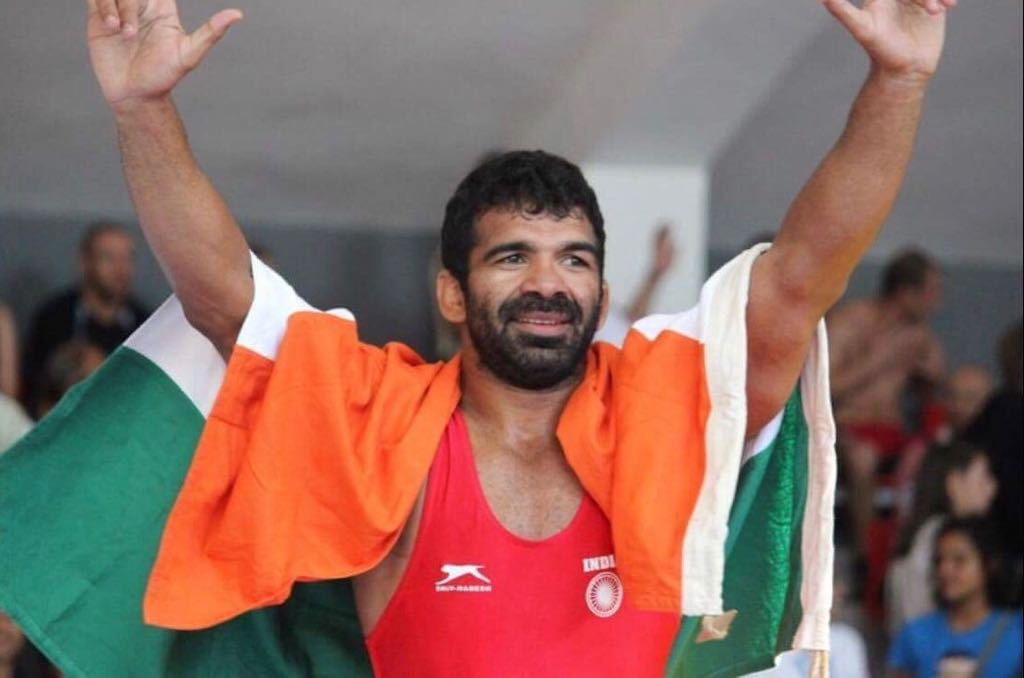
- Virender with the Indian flag after the 2013 Gold Medal finish

Personal information
- Nationality: Indian
- Born: Virender Singh Yadav; 1 April 1986 (age 40) Sasroli, Jhajjar, Haryana
- Website: virendersinghwrestler.com

Sport
- Country: India
- Sport: Men's Wrestling
Medal record
Deaflympics
Gold medal – first place	2005 Melbourne	Freestyle 84kg
Bronze medal – third place	2009 Taiwan	Freestyle 84kg
Gold medal – first place	2013 Bulgaria	Freestyle 74kg
Gold medal – first place	2017 Turkey	Freestyle 74kg
World Deaf Wrestling Championship
Silver medal – second place	2008 Armenia
Bronze medal – third place	2012 Bulgaria
Gold medal – first place	2016 Iran

Virender Singh Yadav (not to be confused with Virender Sehwag) (born 1 April 1986) is an Indian freestyle wrestler. Competing in the 74 kg weight division, he has won 3 Deaflympics Gold Medals and a bronze medal in 4 appearances. He won gold medals at 2005 Summer Deaflympics (Melbourne, Australia), 2013 Summer Deaflympics (Sofia, Bulgaria) and 2017 Summer Deaflympics (Samsun, Turkey). In addition to that, he also won a bronze at 2009 Summer Deaflympics (Taipei, Chinese Taipei).

Virender also won the world title at the world championship and has gold, silver and bronze apiece at the three World Deaf Wrestling Championships that he has been to. Virender won a gold at 2016 World Deaf Wrestling Championship (Tehran, Iran), a silver at 2008 World Deaf Wrestling Championship (Yerevan, Armenia) and a bronze at the 2012 World Deaf Wrestling Championship (Sofia, Bulgaria). This makes it seven medals at the seven international events that Virender has been a part of.

In July 2015, he received the prestigious Arjuna Award – India's sporting honour. Before that, he had received the Rajiv Gandhi State Sports Award, awarded by the Government of Delhi, India.

== Biography ==
Virender Singh was born to a farmers' family of Sasroli village, near jhajjar in haryana. His father, Ajit Singh, was a CISF Jawan, while his mother, Manna Devi, is a homemaker.

Virender was inspired to take up wrestling by his father and uncle, who were wrestlers as this was a family tradition passed on by generations. Virender, as a deaf kid, was bullied in the village and his uncle Surinder Pehelwan brought him to Delhi to live at the CISF akhara with him and his father. Watching his father and uncle wrestle, Virender developed an interest in wrestling and they also found talent in him and started honing his skills. Kumar trained in pehlwani wrestling at major wrestling akharas, namely the Chhatrasal Stadium and Guru Hanuman akhara. With minimal funds and poor training facilities for wrestling in India, even for the Deaflympics team, his family made sure he obtained the necessary dietary supplements by sending him tinned milk, ghee and fresh vegetables.

Kumar is presently employed with the Sports Authority of India as a Junior Sports Coach training the next generation of wrestlers.

== Career ==
Virender started training in pehlwani at the CISF akhada at the age of 9. He was trained at the akhada by Surinder Pehelwan, his uncle, later by Dronacharya Awardee Coaches Maha Singh Rao and Ramphal Singh.

Virender's first success came at the National Rounds of the World Cadet Wrestling Championships in 2002, where he won the gold medal. Even though the win meant automatic qualification for the world event, he was unfairly disqualified from going to the world event by the Wrestling Federation of India (WFI), citing his deafness as the reason for doing so. It has to be said here that the world body doesn't disqualify deaf players or disabled players from the event but the WFI sent the Silver medallist and Virender was ignored. This was his initiation into the world of discrimination which dogged him all throughout his career. After this, in the year 2005, he got to know of the Deaflympics, formerly The World Games for the Deaf or The Silent Games, and keen on showing his mettle made it to the 2005 Summer Deaflympics in Melbourne, Australia and won the gold medal. There was no stopping him after that as he had found recognition amongst his own. He never gave up on the dream of representing India at the Olympics, but consistent discrimination and lack of knowledge on the part of the Wrestling Federation of India meant that he could never get referees that could govern matches for the deaf. He focused on the deaf games and in 2008 went to the World Deaf Wrestling Championships in Armenia, and secured a silver. Post that, at the 2009 Summer Deaflympics he bagged the bronze in Taipei, China. At the 2012 World Deaf Wrestling Championships, he won a bronze in Sofia, Bulgaria. Again, at the 2013 Summer Deaflympics his performance was stellar earning him a gold medal. This was to be the best phase of his career as post this he followed it up with a gold medal at the 2016 World Deaf Wrestling Championships in Tehran, Iran. And this was followed by the 2017 Summer Deaflympics in Samsun, Turkey where he again won a gold medal. Virender was awarded the Arjuna Award for his stellar contribution to Indian Sports. he has also won Padma Shri for sports in 2021.

== Film on his Life ==
Virender Singh also became the subject of a documentary titled, Goonga Pehelwan. The name of the film translates to 'The Mute Wrestler', which although is a politically incorrect term was used because that is how the world knew him and his real name was almost forgotten in the wrestling circles and even his family usually referred to him as Goonga. The 45-minute documentary film went on to play at film festivals across the Globe and also won the highest Indian film honour, National Film Award in the year 2015.

== Government Snub ==
Even after his successes, he has been consistently ignored for top sporting honours and cash awards for much of his career. Even though the competition levels at the Paralympics and the Deaflympics are similar and both events are officially sanctioned by the International Olympic Committee, the Government of India has paid no attention to the Deaf Games. The Paralympic Sports Movement has found much support with awards at all levels for para-athletes but deaf athletes have been ignored throughout, thereby pushing Virender Singh and athletes of his kind into the background and financially difficult circumstances.

== See also ==
- India at the Deaflympics
