= Satish Kumar (athlete) =

Indian para-athlete

- Occupation: Athlete
- Known for: Arjuna Award

Shri Satish Kumar was a deaf-mute competitor in para athletics who won the Arjuna Award in 1977-1978.
