= Dhanush Srikanth =

Indian sports shooter

Personal information
- Born: 21 July 2002 (age 24)

Sport
- Country: India
Medal record
Representing India
Men's shooting
Deaflympics
Gold medal – first place	2021 Caxias do Sul	10m air rifle
Gold medal – first place	2021 Caxias do Sul	10m air rifle mixed
Gold medal – first place	2025 Tokyo	10m air rifle
ISSF Junior World Cup
Gold medal – first place	2023 Suhl	10m air rifle

Dhanush Srikanth (born 21 July 2002) is an Indian deaf sports shooter. He made his Deaflympic debut at the age of 19 representing India at the 2021 Summer Deaflympics (held in May 2022). Despite his deafness, he has been competing in Indian shooting circuit and has been regarded as one of the regular faces in Indian shooting fraternity. He is currently coached by former Indian sports shooter Gagan Narang at the Guns for Glory Shooting Academy in Hyderabad.

== Biography ==
During his childhood, although he was having deafness and hearing difficulties, his parents allowed him to mingle with other normally abled children and allowed him to study, play with other children in order to not let him seek special attention. Prior to competing at Deaflympics, he had not learnt sign language. He also had communication issues and had difficulties in reading. He learnt the art of shooting from Gagan Narang through his drawings and sketches. It was Srikanth's mother who sought the assistance of Narang when Srikanth was still a 13 year old kid. Srikanth has speech impairments in addition to hearing impairments.

== Career ==
He took part in the 2018 Telangana State Shooting Championships and won junior, youth and senior titles. He won a gold medal in U-21 category at the 2019 Khelo India Youth Games and became the first deaf person to claim a medal in Khelo India Youth Games.

In September 2019, he became the first deaf shooter to represent Indian national shooting team when he made it to U21 men's 10m air rifle team for the 2019 Asian Shooting Championships at the age of 16 and he also became the first deaf shooter from India ever to qualify for the Asian Shooting Championships in U21 category. He claimed three gold medals in men's individual 10m air rifle junior event, men's team 10m air rifle junior event and mixed gender 10m air rifle junior event at the 2019 Asian Shooting Championships in Doha. He clinched gold medal in the team event at the ISSF Junior World Shooting Championships in September 2021. He could not qualify for the 2022 Asian Games after failing to make the cut during NRAI trials.

He competed at the 2021 Summer Deaflympics and clinched a gold medal in the men's 10m air rifle shooting event with a new deaf world record by registering a score of 247.5 points in the final. He eventually became the first Indian to secure a gold medal in 2021 Summer Deaflympics. In the same 2021 Deaflympics, he claimed another gold pairing with Priyesha Deshmukh in the final of the mixed rifle event. The pair defeated Germany's Sabrina Eckert and Sebastian Herrmany 16–10 to win the mixed rifle event.

At the 2023 ISSF Junior World Cup in Suhl, Srikanth won a gold medal in the 10m air rifle event with a score of 249.4 in the finals.

== See also ==
- India at the Deaflympics
