= Jafreen Shaik =

Indian tennis player

Shaik Jafreen
- Born: 7 September 1997 (age 29) Kurnool, Andhra Pradesh, India
- Plays: right-handed
Medal record
Women's tennis
Representing India
Deaflympics
Bronze medal – third place	2017 Samsun	mixed doubles

Shaik Jafreen (born 7 September 1997) is a deaf Indian tennis player. She represented India at the Deaflympics in 2013 and 2017. She claimed a bronze medal in the mixed doubles at the 2017 Summer Deaflympics partnering with Prithvi Sekhar.

== Career ==
Jafreen started playing tennis when she was just eight years old. She went on to become a formidable tennis player despite being deaf, after being noticed by India's best female tennis player, Sania Mirza, and gaining assistance from her, receiving training at the Sania Mirza Tennis Academy which is located in Hyderabad.

She went on to represent India at the 2013 Summer Deaflympics which was also her first Deaflympic appearance. As in the as of Prithvi Sekhar, she did not win a medal in her debut Deaflympic event. She was chosen to compete for India at the 2017 Summer Deaflympics as India sent a delegation consisting of 46 participants for the multi-sport event, the largest number of athletes sent by India to a single Summer Deaflympics. Jafreen along with Prithvi Sekhar won a historical bronze medal in the mixed doubles at the 2017 Summer Deaflympics, marking India's first ever Deaflympic medal in tennis.

== Awards and recognition ==
Jafreen received the Jury Special Recognition in Sports at the Sakshi Excellence Awards 2017.

In 2021, she was honored with the national award for sporting excellence by the Union Ministry of Social Justice and Empowerment, being recognized as the best sportsperson with a disability (hearing impaired).

In accordance with its sports policy of offering Group-1 posts to international sportspersons, the Andhra Pradesh government extended a government job offer to Jafreen in November 2023.

== See also ==
- India at the Deaflympics
