= 2025 Summer Deaflympics =

25th Summer Deaflympics

XXV Summer Deaflympics
- Host city: Tokyo, Japan
- Nations: 79
- Athletes: 2,911
- Events: 209 in 18 sports (21 disciplines)
- Opening: 15 November 2025
- Closing: 26 November 2025
- Opened by: CISS President Ádám Kósa
- Athlete's Oath: Maki Yamada; Moe Hoshino
- Torch lighter: Riho Kamezawa; Ryutaro Ibara
- Main venue: Tokyo Metropolitan Gymnasium
- Website: Official website

Summer

Winter

The 2025 Summer Deaflympics, officially known as the 25th Summer Deaflympics or XXV Summer Deaflympics, was an international multi-sport event held in Tokyo, Japan from 15 to 26 November 2025. The multi-sport event commemorates the 100th anniversary of the Deaflympics, as the inaugural edition was kicked off in 1924. This was the first time Japan hosted the Summer Deaflympics. It marks the fourth time that an Asian-Pacific National Deaf Sports Association has been given the hosting rights of the Summer Deaflympics after New Zealand (1989), Australia (2005), and Taiwan (2009). The event returned to its usual four-year cycle, following the postponement of the 2021 Summer Deaflympics to 2022, due to the COVID-19 pandemic.

== Bidding process ==
The Japanese Federation of the Deaf, and the Japanese Deaf Sports Federation, collaborated to hold their first meeting under the theme "Deaflympics 2025 Bid Preparation Division" on 18 January 2021. During the meeting, the progression report and status of the campaign activities and the cohesive bidding strategies towards promoting Japan as the host nation for the 2025 Summer Deaflympics, was shared with the participants. In June 2022, the Governor of Tokyo, Yuriko Koike, expressed her support and cooperation for the bidding process by unanimously nominating Tokyo to be considered as the official host city of the games. After the proceedings, the Japanese Federation of the Deaf, and the Japanese Deaf Sports Federation, showed their optimism and keen interest in winning the bid for the hosting rights of the Summer Deaflympics. It was in 2018 that the Japanese Federation of the Deaf made ambitious efforts to implement strategic plans for the bidding of the 2025 Summer Deaflympics.

On 10 September 2022, at the general congress of the Comité International des Sports des Sourds (ICSD) held in Vienna, Tokyo was announced as the host city for the 2025 Summer Deaflympics, since no other city had applied for the process.

== Development and preparations ==
=== Venues ===
The Japanese Federation of the Deaf structured the draft plan for hosting the sporting competitions mainly in Tokyo. Komazawa Olympic Park Stadium in Tokyo, and venues in Shizuoka Prefecture and Fukushima Prefecture, were considered as subhost venues. The opening ceremony and closing ceremony of the games are scheduled be held at the Tokyo Metropolitan Gymnasium. The organizers have taken inspiration from the International Olympic Committee's (IOC) 2020+5 Agenda, with the aim of optimizing resources. Some facilities which were used at the 1964 Summer Olympics, 2020 Summer Olympics, 1964 Summer Paralympics, and the 2020 Summer Paralympics, have been chosen as sites for the sporting competitions during the Tokyo 2025 Deaflympics.

==== Venues within the Tokyo Metropolis ====
City/Ward	Venue	Events	Capacity
Chūō	Tokyo Expressway	Athletics (marathon)	TBA
Setagaya	Komazawa Olympic Park Stadium	Athletics (all track and field events except hammer throw)	20,010
Setagaya	Komazawa Gymnasium	Handball	3,875
Setagaya	Komazawa Volleyball Courts	Volleyball	1,500
Shibuya	Tokyo Metropolitan Gymnasium	Ceremonies	10,000
Shibuya	Tokyo Metropolitan Gymnasium	Table tennis	10,000
Ōta	Ota City General Gymnasium	Basketball	4,012
Ōta	Omori Higashi Waterside Sports Square	Beach volleyball	TBA
Ōta	Ōi Futō Chūō Kaihin Park	Athletics (hammer throw)	2,000
Chiyoda	Hibiya Park	Orienteering	TBA
Kōtō	Ariake Coliseum	Tennis	10,000 (center court)
Kōtō	Tokyo Aquatics Centre	Swimming	10,000
Kōtō	Wakasu Golf Links	Golf	TBA
Adachi	Tokyo Budokan	Judo	1,728
Adachi	Tokyo Budokan	Karate	1,728
Kita	Ajinomoto National Training Center	Shooting	TBA
Nakano	Nakano Gymnasium	Taekwondo	804
Chōfu	Musashino Forest Sport Plaza	Badminton	10,000
Fuchū	Fuchu Comprehensive Gymnasium	Wrestling	928
Higashiyamato	Higashiyamato Grandbowl	Bowling	TBA
Ōshima	Izu Ōshima Geopark	Orienteering	TBA

==== Satellite Venues ====
Prefecture	City	Venue	Events	Capacity
Shizuoka Prefecture	Izu	Japan Cycle Sports Center	Cycling (mountain biking/road)	TBA
Fukushima Prefecture	Hirono	J-Village Stadium	Football	5,000

== Opening ceremony ==
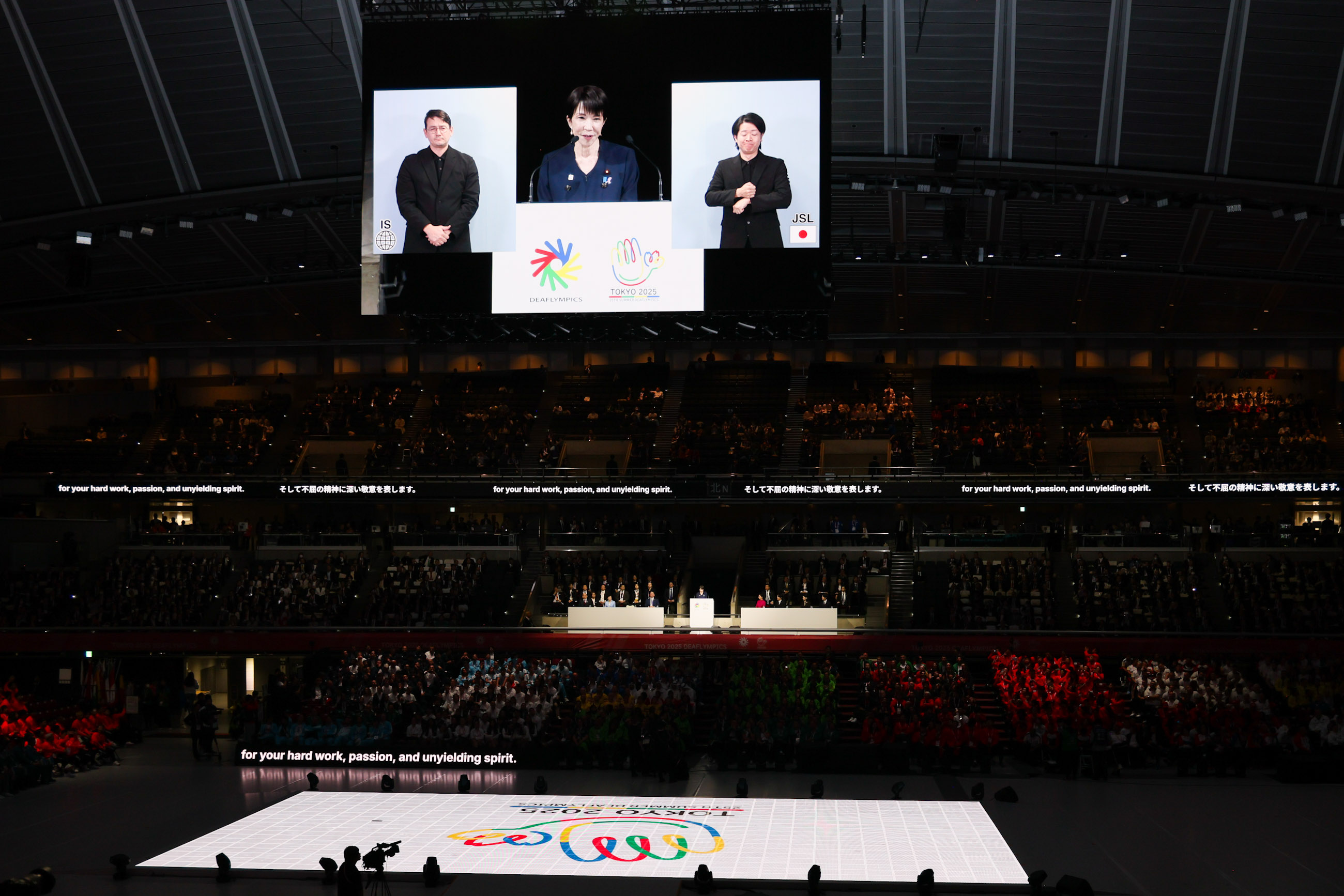
Prime Minister of Japan, Sanae Takaichi, delivering a speech during the opening ceremony

The opening ceremony for the games was held at the Tokyo Metropolitan Gymnasium on the evening of 15 November. The ceremony included Awa Odori dance performances as competitors entered the stadium. The Japanese delegation entered last, with karateka Ogura Ryo carrying the flag.

Prime Minister Sanae Takaichi spoke during the opening ceremony. The family of Crown Prince Akishino were also in attendance.

== The Games ==
=== Sports ===
209 Events (10 less than the previous Games) in 18 sports (21 disciplines):

2025 Summer Deaflympics Sports Programme
1. Athletics (43)
2. Badminton (6)
3. Basketball (2)
4. Bowling (7)
5. Cycling (12) (MTB (4) + Road (8))
6. Football (2)
7. Golf (3)
8. Handball (1)
9. Judo (16)
10. Karate (14)
11. Orienteering (9)
12. Shooting (13)
13. Swimming (42)
14. Table tennis (7)
15. Taekwondo (11)
16. Tennis (5)
17. Volleyball (4) (Beach (2) + Indoor (2))
18. Wrestling (12) (GR (6) + FR (6))

=== Participating nations ===
79 National Deaf Sports Federations sent their delegations to Tokyo.For the first time, there was a Refugee team, composed of an athlete from South Sudan, competing under the Deaflympics flag.Also participating for the first time are athletes from Laos and Timor-Leste, whose Deaflympic Committees were recently recognized, but who did not have time to register to compete in Tokyo and are participating as a Deaflympic Team and in accordance with the rules established by the International Olympic Committee (IOC), the ICSD has permitted athletes from Russia and Belarus to compete in sports where the respective International Federation (IF) allows. These athletes will compete strictly under neutral status as Deaf Individual Neutral Athletes (DINA) at the Tokyo Deaflympics Games.

Participating National Deaf Sports Associations
1. Algeria (15)
2. Argentina (30)
3. Armenia (9)
4. Australia (96)
5. Austria (7)
6. Azerbaijan (19)
7. Bahrain (8)
8. Belgium (9)
9. Brazil (117)
10. Bulgaria (27)
11. Canada (47)
12. Chile (4)
13. China (101)
14. Colombia (28)
15. Ivory Coast (2)
16. Croatia (33)
17. Cuba (21)
18. Cyprus (2)
19. Czech Republic (16)
20. Denmark (17)
21. Ecuador (8)
22. Estonia (7)
23. Finland (5)
24. France (73)
25. Gabon (4)
26. Germany (67)
27. Great Britain (65)
28. Greece (48)
29. Hong Kong (25)
30. Hungary (24)
31. India (71)
32. Individual Neutral Athletes (60)
33. Deaflympics Refugee Team (5)
34. Iraq (5)
35. Ireland (8)
36. Iran (82)
37. Israel (17)
38. Italy (84)
39. Japan (268) (host)
40. Kazakhstan (77)
41. Kenya (85)
42. South Korea (92)
43. Kuwait (7)
44. Kyrgyzstan (18)
45. Latvia (10)
46. Lebanon (4)
47. Lithuania (44)
48. Macau (12)
49. Malaysia (25)
50. Mali (5)
51. Malta (1)
52. Mauritius (3)
53. Mexico (38)
54. Mongolia (14)
55. Namibia (10)
56. Nepal (6)
57. Netherlands (3)
58. North Macedonia (2)
59. Norway (7)
60. Philippines (6)
61. Poland (94)
62. Portugal (12)
63. Saudi Arabia (12)
64. Serbia (21)
65. Singapore (1)
66. Slovakia (16)
67. Slovenia (7)
68. South Africa (14)
69. Sweden (15)
70. Switzerland (8)
71. Chinese Taipei (75)
72. Thailand (10)
73. Turkey (183)
74. Ukraine (174)
75. United Arab Emirates (7)
76. United States (171)
77. Uzbekistan (33)
78. Venezuela (52)
79. Zambia (3)

Ranking	NOC	Athletes
1	Japan (Host)	268
2	Turkey	183
3	Ukraine	174
4	United States	171
5	Brazil	117
6	China	101
7	Australia	96
8	Poland	94
9	South Korea	92
10	Kenya	85
11	Italy	84
12	Iran	82
13	Kazakhstan	77
14	Chinese Taipei	75
15	France	73
16	India	71
17	Germany	67
18	Great Britain	65
19	Individual Neutral Athletes	60
20	Venezuela	52
21	Greece	48
22	Lithuania	44
23	Mexico	38
24	Croatia	33
25	Uzbekistan	33
Total		2,911

== Calendar ==
The calendar was last updated on 7 November 2025.

All times and dates use Japan Standard Time (UTC+09:00)

OC	Opening ceremony	●	Event competitions	1	Gold medal events	CC	Closing ceremony

November 2025		14th Fri	15th Sat	16th Sun	17th Mon	18th Tue	19th Wed	20th Thu	21st Fri	22nd Sat	23rd Sun	24th Mon	25th Tue	26th Wed	Events
Ceremonies			OC											CC	—N/a
Athletics					3	5	10	2	●	3	9	9	2		43
Badminton				●	●	●	●	●	5		●	●	1		6
Basketball				●	●	●	●	●	●	●	●	●	2		2
Bowling					●	●	1	1	1	1	1	1	1		7
Cycling	Road				2	2		2		2					8
Cycling	MTB											2	2		4
Football		●	●	●	●	●	●	●	●	●	●	●	2		2
Golf						●	●	2	1						3
Handball				●	●		●		●		●		1		1
Judo				6	8	2									16
Karate											5	7	2		14
Orienteering			2	2				2	2		1				9
Shooting				2	2	1	2	1	1	1	1	1	1		13
Swimming								8	5	7	7	7	8		42
Table tennis						1	2	●	2		●	2			7
Taekwondo										3	4	4			11
Tennis				●	●	●	●	●	●	●	1	2	2		5
Volleyball	Beach			●	●	●	●	●	●	●	2				2
Volleyball	Indoor			●	●	●	●	●		●	●	●	2		2
Wrestling									●	6	●	6			12
Daily medal events		0	2	10	15	11	15	18	17	23	31	41	26	0	209
Cumulative total		0	2	12	27	38	53	71	88	111	142	183	209	209	209
November 2025		14th Fri	15th Sat	16th Sun	17th Mon	18th Tue	19th Wed	20th Thu	21st Fri	22nd Sat	23rd Sun	24th Mon	25th Tue	26th Wed	Total events

== Medal table ==
* Host nation (Japan)

Rank	NDSC	Gold	Silver	Bronze	Total
1	Ukraine	32	39	31	102
–	Individual Neutral Athletes	32	12	8	52
2	United States	17	7	12	36
3	Japan*	16	12	23	51
4	China	12	16	22	50
5	South Korea	11	13	19	43
6	India	9	7	4	20
7	Iran	8	10	19	37
8	Italy	8	8	5	21
9	Kazakhstan	8	4	13	25
10	Germany	6	8	10	24
11	Kenya	5	6	4	15
12	Great Britain	5	3	4	12
13	France	5	2	2	9
14	Lithuania	3	4	3	10
15	Portugal	3	2	1	6
16	Croatia	3	0	5	8
17	Estonia	3	0	0	3
18	Turkey	2	8	16	26
19	Mexico	2	2	1	5
20	Czech Republic	2	1	2	5
21	Kyrgyzstan	2	0	4	6
22	Hungary	1	7	5	13
23	Chinese Taipei	1	6	6	13
24	Uzbekistan	1	4	4	9
25	Sweden	1	4	2	7
26	Malaysia	1	2	1	4
27	Australia	1	2	0	3
28	Colombia	1	1	5	7
29	Greece	1	1	2	4
30	Cuba	1	1	1	3
31	Finland	1	1	0	2
32	Canada	1	0	1	2
32	Ecuador	1	0	1	2
34	Brazil	1	0	0	1
34	Macau	1	0	0	1
34	Slovakia	1	0	0	1
37	Poland	0	5	12	17
38	Algeria	0	4	2	6
39	Venezuela	0	1	5	6
40	Armenia	0	1	3	4
41	Austria	0	1	2	3
41	Latvia	0	1	2	3
43	Azerbaijan	0	1	0	1
43	Israel	0	1	0	1
43	Netherlands	0	1	0	1
46	Slovenia	0	0	3	3
47	Mongolia	0	0	2	2
48	Argentina	0	0	1	1
48	Belgium	0	0	1	1
48	Bulgaria	0	0	1	1
48	Cyprus	0	0	1	1
48	Hong Kong	0	0	1	1
48	Philippines	0	0	1	1
48	Thailand	0	0	1	1
Totals (54 entries)		209	209	274	692

== Development ==
Once Tokyo was announced as the host city for the 2025 Summer Deaflympics, the Tokyo Metropolitan Government generated robust promotional campaigns to publicize awareness about the Deaflympics. The awareness initiatives included providing special informational booths at sporting events. Because Tokyo had been earmarked to host both the 2025 Summer Deaflympics and the 2025 World Athletics Championships, the Tokyo Metropolitan Government focused on promoting Tokyo as an inclusive city under the motto, "with anyone, anytime, anywhere." The TMG also installed transparent translation screens at subway train stations across Tokyo, to guide foreign tourists when they arrived at transit stations, with the 2025 Deaflympics on the agenda of TMG's action plans. Informational pamphlets raising awareness about the Deaflympics were also distributed to various elementary schools in Tokyo.

After consideration of information collected during a 2021 survey conducted by the Tokyo-based Nippon Foundation Parasports Support Center, the Tokyo Metropolitan Government undertook initiatives to promote awareness about Deaflympics The 2021 survey results indicated a deep lack of knowledge by the public about sport competitions for the world's deaf communities. The survey reported that a mere 16.3% of respondents had been aware of the Deaflympics. This was in stark contrast to the higher awareness and tremendous response, that was revealed in a survey about the Paralympic Games.

In November 2023, the Tokyo Metropolitan Government officially declared open the 'Miru Café' as part of a key initiative in the lead-up to the 2025 Summer Deaflympics. This café has been established to operate on a temporary basis, until the conclusion of the Deaflympics. Former Japanese Olympic marathon runner Akemi Masuda was appointed as an advisor to the preparation office for the Tokyo Deaflympics. In January 2025, sources reported that the athletic equipment company Asics had announced a strategic collaboration with the organizers of the Summer Deaflympics as its Total Support Member.

== Deaf culture ==
The organizers of the 2025 Summer Deaflympics faced challenges over the lack of international sign language interpreters who could provide interpretation for the various athletes, as a large number of them traveling from different nations with significantly diverse sets of deaf culture and sign language patterns. The Japanese Federation of the Deaf, which was at the forefront during Tokyo's successful bid for the Deaflympics, brought attention to the issue that international sign language is a rare commodity in daily life in Japan.

It was further revealed that a system of qualifications to classify interpreters as meeting agreed upon criteria for international sign language interpretation in Japan, did not exist. Ongoing concerns were shared regarding the lack of reporting and enumerating the number of people in Japan who considered themselves specialists in sign language. The Tokyo Metropolitan Government was informed about the worrisome possibility of lack of qualified international sign language interpreters. The Tokyo Metropolitan Government also apparently planned to provide an intensive training workshop to the interpreters on the appropriate usage of international sign language.

Proponents emphasized how the Tokyo Deaflympics would propel a positive change in the development of deaf athletes, who are largely unrecognized in Japan. They additionally highlighted how deaf athletes in Japan are denied the opportunity to use adequate training facilities, including restricted access to the Ajinomoto National Training Center, and they are constantly deprived of government funding. Critics stated that the government policy in Japan only gives substantial support and attention to the Olympics and Paralympics, while the Deaflympics are not taken into consideration. According to critics, the government policy in Japan emphasizes equal respect and importance toward both the Olympics and Paralympics, but the same level of recognition does not apply to the Deaflympics.

Preceded by Caxias do Sul 2021	Summer Deaflympic Games; Tokyo; XXV Summer Deaflympics (2025)	Succeeded by Athens 2029
