= Brookville Tunnel =

Railroad tunnel in Virginia, United States

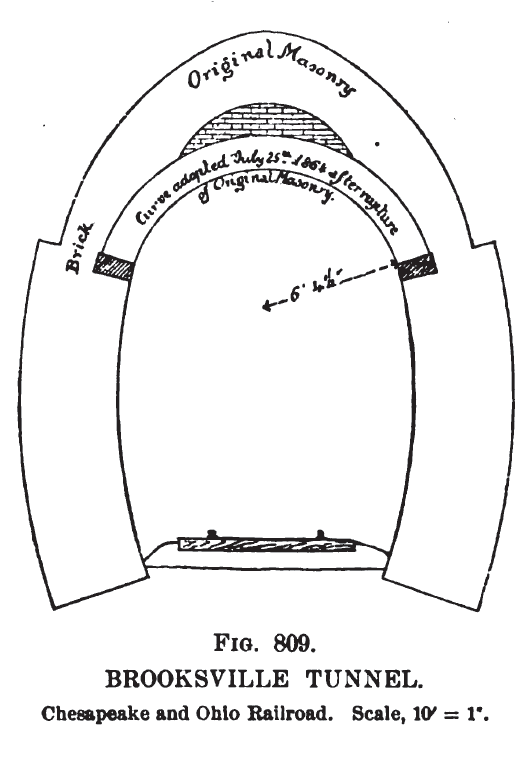
- Diagram of the Brookville Tunnel
- Interactive map of Brookville Tunnel

Overview
- Line: Chesapeake and Ohio Railway (C&O) Mountain Subdivision – previously C&O Railroad and Blue Ridge Railroad
- Location: Albemarle County
- Coordinates: 38°02′38″N 78°47′55″W
- Status: Demolished, replaced by cut

Operation
- Opened: 1856
- Closed: 1960s–1970s
- Owner: Blue Ridge Railroad (1856–1870); Chesapeake and Ohio Railroad (1870–1878); Chesapeake and Ohio Railway (1878–abandonment)

Technical
- Length: 869 feet (265 m) (Note: Sources vary on the length of the tunnel, the following are reported lengths: 859 feet (262 m), 864 feet (263 m), 869 feet (265 m).)
- No. of tracks: 1
- Track gauge: 4 ft 8 1/2 in (1,435 mm)
- Grade: 70 ft/mi (1.326%)

The Brookville Tunnel (also Brooksville Tunnel) was a historic railroad tunnel engineered by Claudius Crozet during the construction of the Blue Ridge Railroad in the 1850s. The tunnel was part of a series of four tunnels used to cross the Blue Ridge Mountains of Virginia for the Virginia Central Railroad of the United States. The Brookville Tunnel was the second tunnel used to cross the mountains from the east (the easternmost being the Greenwood Tunnel), and was located approximately 1.5 miles (2.4 km) west of the village of Greenwood, Virginia.

During its construction, numerous cave-ins and landslides occurred because of the fragile and weak rock the tunnel passed through, and at one point, an outbreak of cholera forced work to stop. By October 1856 the tunnel was completed at a cost of $114,600, having been lined with a thick elliptical brick arch to hold back the earth. The Brookville Tunnel was used by the Virginia Central Railroad, and after 1868, the line's successor, the Chesapeake and Ohio Railroad. After the reorganization of the line in 1878 as the Chesapeake and Ohio Railway, the tunnel continued to be used until it was demolished and replaced by a cut during the construction of Interstate 64 in the 1960s and 1970s, at which point it was one of only two of Crozet's original four tunnels still in use.

== History ==
On March 5, 1849, the Virginia General Assembly passed an act to incorporate the Blue Ridge Railroad. This railroad was to construct a rail line over the Blue Ridge Mountains for the Louisa railroad (renamed as the Virginia Central Railroad in February 1850) from a point near Blair Park at the eastern base of the mountains to Waynesboro in the Shenandoah Valley via Rockfish Gap. Claudius Crozet was appointed as chief engineer of the Blue Ridge Railroad and developed a plan to cross the mountains using a series of four tunnels. The first tunnel from the east was the Greenwood Tunnel, built through a difficult and insecure ridge near Greenwood. Brookville tunnel was located 1.5 miles (2.4 km) west of the Greenwood Tunnel, also built through a small offshoot spur of the Blue Ridge Mountains.

Construction on the Brookville Tunnel, or the "middle" or "second tunnel" as it was then called, was begun sometime between 1849 and 1851. The earth encountered at Brookville was of a much weaker quality than at the Greenwood Tunnel, rendering the digging of the tunnel both an extremely dangerous and difficult task. Although the eastern section of the ridge was composed of firm and sturdy rock, the majority of the tunnel passed through a mixture of frail slate that was formed at a steep angle, soapstone, and clay. When exposed to air, this mixture would often disintegrate causing large amounts of earth to fall into the tunnel bore. On two occasions during the tunnel's construction, though great care was taken to provide temporary support, major cave-ins occurred forming craters on top of the ridge, as much as 150 feet (46 m) above the tunnel. Another slide occurred on the outside of the western portal that blocked the entrance to the tunnel and prevented workers from repairing the damage from the two internal cave-ins. Rocks often fell down upon the timbers under which the men worked, creating sounds described as "resembling that of distant thunder". The weakness of the earth, especially in the western sections, necessitated the implementation of a strong arch throughout approximately 500 feet (150 m) of the tunnel and a durable brick lining. Crozet described the nature of the work on the tunnel in an 1854 letter:

The Brooksville Tunnel is the most difficult work of the kind, I have seen any record of: at the Western entrance, the pressure of the big slides actually causes the bottom to surge up, as is sometime the case in coal mines; in view of the sliding tendency and immense pressure of this ground, it will be advisable to enter on that side with an invested arch to prevent a collapse...This work is vastly more difficult than the Greenwood Tunnel was, though it was not, by any means, an easy safe job.

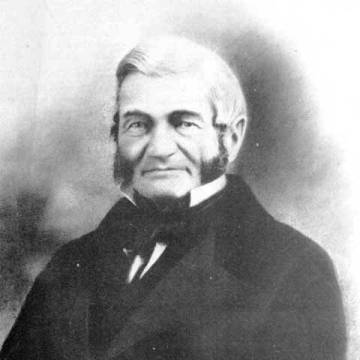
Claudius Crozet, Chief Engineer of the Blue Ridge Railroad.

By this time, the tunnel had come to be known as the "Brooksville Tunnel," after a small stagecoach stop and inn nearby where Crozet's headquarters was located; in later years, the "s" was dropped and the tunnel was simply referred to as the "Brookville Tunnel." In late summer of 1854, an epidemic of cholera broke out among the Irish workers at the tunnel. In a letter to the Virginia Board of Public Works, Crozet states that the epidemic began at the eastern end of the tunnel where around 25 of the total 150 workers perished from the disease. The disease then spread to the western end where another eight workers died before work ceased. During this outbreak, little work could be done on the tunnel, adding yet another delay to the difficult work the Brookville Tunnel posed.

While work on the tunnels continued, the Virginia Central Railroad, eager to connect its eastern division to the line under construction in the Shenandoah Valley, developed plans to use temporary tracks to bypass the incomplete Blue Ridge Railroad. As was done over Rockfish Gap to the west, a temporary track approximately 0.5 miles (0.8 km) long was proposed by the Virginia Central Railroad's Chief Engineer, Charles Ellet, Jr., and constructed around the Brookville Tunnel as the digging continued. Due to the many setbacks and difficulties encountered, the tunnel was not completed until October 1856, just two months prior to the hole-through of the 4,273-foot (1,302 m) Blue Ridge Tunnel at the top of Rockfish Gap. Remarkably, with the exception of the cholera outbreak, no one was injured during the dangerous work completing the Brookville tunnel. The Virginia Central soon after began routing trains through the Brookville tunnel, avoiding the short temporary track.

During the American Civil War (1861–1865), a large crack was found within the tunnel's arch, being in some locations as much as 4 inches (10 cm) wide. Upon examination of the earth above the tunnel, it was found that a section of the earth had slipped, and was resting on the tunnel walls. With the tunnel in danger of collapsing, a plan to address the tunnel's structural issues was developed that put in place a second arch below the original. The new arch was started 12 feet (3.7 m) above the rails and rose to a peak just above what was necessary to clear a brakeman riding atop a railroad car (at that time, 17 feet or 5.2 metres), around 3 feet (0.91 m) below the original arch. Because of the ongoing war and the lack of funds and resources, the new arching could only be completed in 10-foot (3.0 m) segments. It was deemed necessary to re-arch a total of 450 feet (140 m) of the tunnel, and as of 1864, 260 feet (79 m) had been completed at a cost of $23,390.73 (Confederate dollars).

After the war, the tunnel continued to be used by the Virginia Central Railroad, and after 1868, the Chesapeake and Ohio Railroad. The Chesapeake and Ohio Railroad was reorganized as the Chesapeake and Ohio Railway in 1878, and continued to route trains through the tunnel up until the tunnel's demolition with the construction of Interstate 64 in the 1960s and 1970s. At the time of the tunnel's demolition, it was one of only two of Crozet's original four tunnels of the Blue Ridge Railroad still in operation (the other, which as of 2013 is still in use, was the 100-foot (30 m) Little Rock Tunnel). Today, Interstate 64 passes over the cut that replaced the Brookville Tunnel.

== Architecture ==
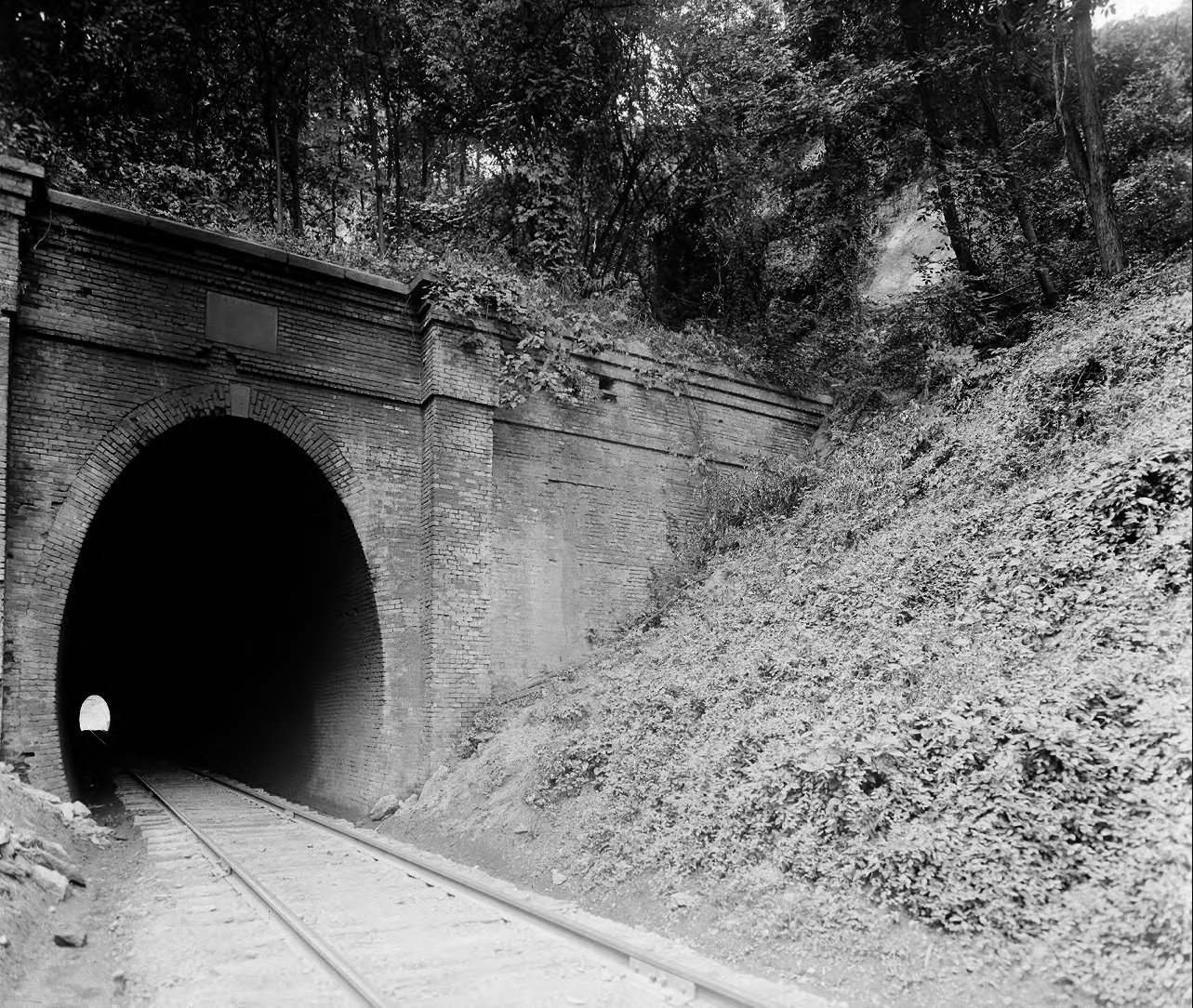
The original Brookville Tunnel used the same style elliptical portals as the Greenwood Tunnel, seen here, and the Blue Ridge Tunnel.

The Brookville Tunnel was constructed in an elliptical form, a design typical of tunnel construction during the 1800s and also used on the Blue Ridge and Greenwood Tunnels. In a November 1849 report, Crozet describes the design to be used on the tunnels:

The shape I have adopted is that of an ellipse, formed by bisecting, on each side, the horizontal ordinates of a circle of 32 feet diameter, down to its center, below which the sides are to be made vertical, if no arch is necessary lower down; otherwise, the ellipse is to continue down to the bottom and to be shaped all round with bricks, stones, or iron, as may appear most eligible. This shape leaves ample room for the cars, and, by contracting the roof, is more secure than a semicircle of 16 feet diameter.

Portions of the Brookville tunnel were lined with brick for added strength, with the brickwork originally contracted to Joseph Dettor, a local brickmaker. Because of the poor quality of Dettor's bricks, Crozet decided to use these bricks on the Greenwood Tunnel to the east, which was a stronger bore than Brookville. Crozet estimated in 1854 that the total number of bricks required for the entire tunnel would be upwards of 750,000. After examining the offers of multiple brickmakers, the Virginia Board of Public Works contracted Robert Harris to provide the bricks for the Brookville Tunnel. The resulting arch was between 3–4 feet (0.9–1.2 m) in thickness over the entire length of the tunnel, and formed an opening approximately 20 feet (6.1 m) high and, at the extreme, 15 feet (4.6 m) wide.

During the construction, the timbers that were used to support the fragile sections of the tunnel to be arched were left in place after the arch was completed, as it was thought too hazardous to remove them. When the earth slip occurred during the Civil War, these remaining timbers acted as levers, furthering the cracking and structural instability of the tunnel. As the new arch was constructed, the old timbers were removed, and the space in between the new and old walls was filled with brick and cement.

The original brick portals were replaced by the Chesapeake and Ohio Railway in 1928 with concrete portals, as part of a series of tunnel upgrades across the line beginning in the 1920s. The new portals no longer bore the distinctive elliptical design of Crozet's original, but had vertical sides and a semi-circular arch.

== Construction Costs ==
The total cost to complete the Brookville Tunnel amounted to $114,600, with a cost per foot, at a length of 869 feet (265 m), of $131.90. By comparison, the cost per foot of the 538-foot (164 m) Greenwood Tunnel was $138.30, the 100-foot (30 m) Little Rock Tunnel was $123.90, and the 4,273-foot (1,302 m) Blue Ridge Tunnel was $108.60. Costs at the Brookville Tunnel were greatly increased from the expected by the frail and insecure earth encountered, contrary to what originally appeared to be solid rock. Workers, both inside and outside laborers, were paid approximately $1.12 per day, while miners were paid $1.37 per day, equivalent to $40.13 and $49.09, respectively, today.
