= Blue Ridge Tunnel =

Historic railroad tunnel

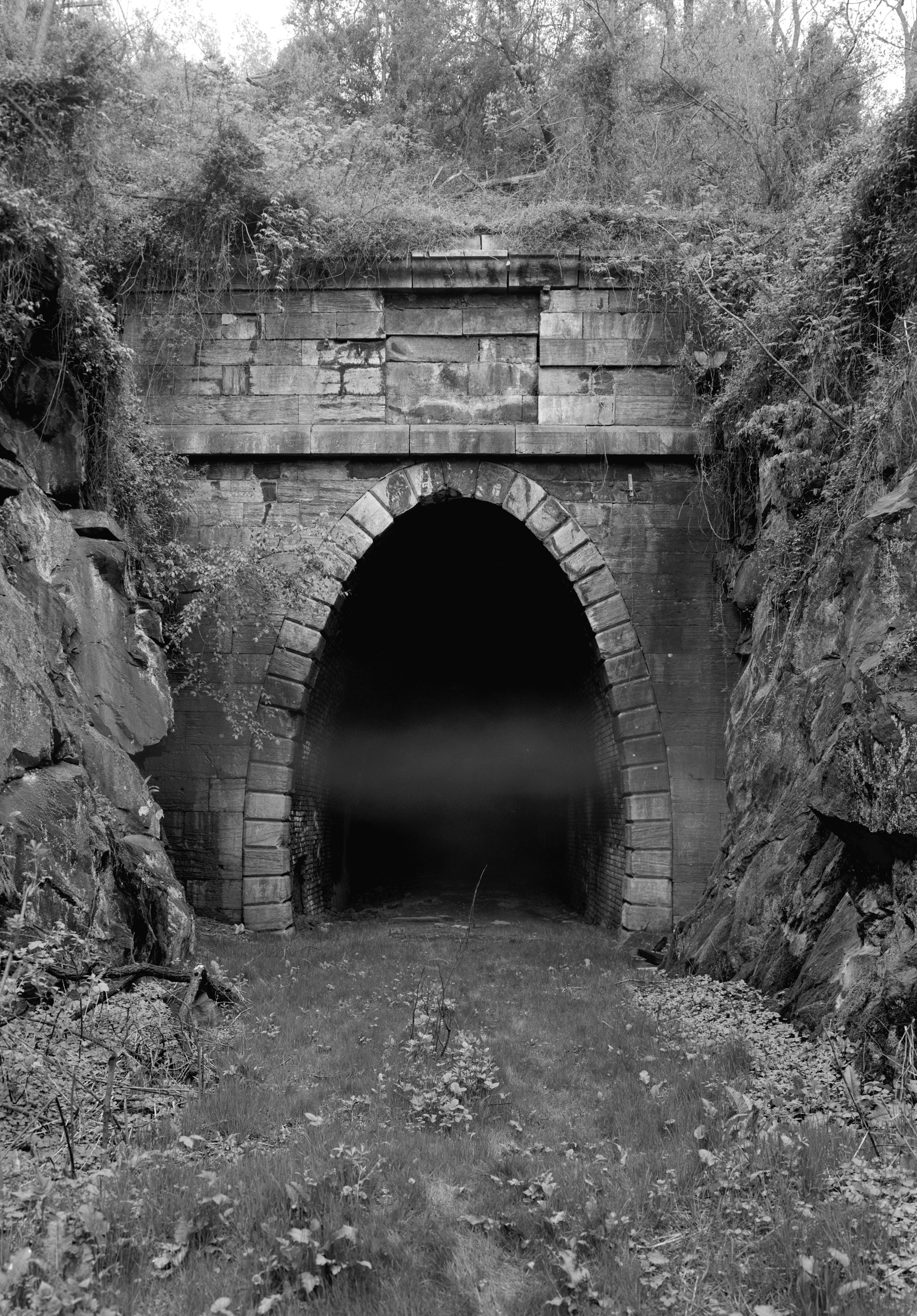
- West Entrance to the Blue Ridge Tunnel
- Interactive map of Blue Ridge Tunnel

Overview
- Line: Chesapeake and Ohio Railway (C&O) Mountain Subdivision – previously C&O Railroad and Blue Ridge Railroad
- Location: Augusta / Nelson counties, near Rockfish Gap, Virginia
- Coordinates: 38°02′18″N 78°51′45″W (Northwest Portal of new tunnel)
- Status: Abandoned, replaced by new tunnel currently in operation

Operation
- Opened: 1858
- Owner: Blue Ridge Railroad (1856–1870); Chesapeake and Ohio Railroad (1870–1878); Chesapeake and Ohio Railway (1878–1944)

Technical
- Line length: 4,237 ft (1,291 m)
- Track gauge: 4 ft 8 1/2 in (1,435 mm)
- Grade: 70 ft/mi (1.326%)

The Blue Ridge Tunnel (also known as the Crozet Tunnel) is a historic railroad tunnel built during the construction of the Blue Ridge Railroad in the 1850s. The tunnel was the westernmost and longest of four tunnels engineered by Claudius Crozet to cross the Blue Ridge Mountains at Rockfish Gap in central Virginia.

At 4,237 feet (1,291 m) in length, the tunnel was the longest tunnel in the United States at the time of its completion. The tunnel was used by the Virginia Central Railroad from its opening to 1858, when the line was reorganized as the Chesapeake and Ohio Railroad (renamed Chesapeake and Ohio Railway in 1878). The Chesapeake and Ohio routed trains through the tunnel until it was abandoned and replaced by a new tunnel in 1944.

The new tunnel was named the "Blue Ridge Tunnel" as well, although the original tunnel still remains abandoned nearby. The old Blue Ridge Tunnel has since been named a Historic Civil Engineering Landmark by the American Society of Civil Engineers in 1976. In late 2020, after a decade of stabilization work and restoration as well as access pathway construction, the tunnel was opened to visitors as a linear park.

== Construction ==
The Blue Ridge Railroad was incorporated by the Commonwealth of Virginia in 1849 with Claudius Crozet as chief engineer. Its purpose was to provide a crossing of the Blue Ridge Mountains for the Virginia Central Railroad into the Shenandoah Valley.

The Virginia Board of Public Works, founded in 1816, supported numerous internal improvements in the state, owning part of the Virginia Central in stock as well as virtually all of the Blue Ridge Railroad.

A civil engineer of considerable skill, Crozet had identified the eventual route as early as 1839. Rail service reached Charlottesville by 1851; westward, the railroad closely followed the alignment of the ancient Three Notch'd Road.

To protect its investment and enable transportation, the State then incorporated and financed the Blue Ridge Railroad to accomplish the hard and expensive task of crossing the Blue Ridge mountain barrier to the west. Rather than attempting the more formidable Swift Run Gap, the state-owned Blue Ridge Railroad built over the mountains at the next major gap to the south, Rockfish Gap near Afton Mountain.

Overseen by Crozet, the crossing was accomplished by building four tunnels, including the 4,237-foot (1,291 m) Blue Ridge Tunnel near the top of the pass. Construction began in 1850 and was expected to be completed in three years but the first train passed through the tunnel in 1858 and construction continued until 1860. With construction proceeding from either side a decade before the invention of dynamite, the complex was dug through solid granite with only hand drills and black powder. The tunnel was less than 6 inches (150 mm) off perfect alignment when it was holed through on December 29, 1856.

Records show that about 800 Irishmen and 40 enslaved African American laborers worked on the tunnel and there were 189 recorded deaths during its construction including men, women, and children who died during a cholera epidemic in 1854.

When completed, the Blue Ridge Tunnel was the longest in the United States and one of the longest tunnels in the world, a remarkable feat of engineering. It opened to rail traffic in April 1858, and was considered to be one of the engineering wonders of the modern world.

== American Civil War ==
During the American Civil War, the infantry under Confederate General Stonewall Jackson earned the nickname "foot cavalry" by traveling very quickly across the Blue Ridge Mountains, to the consternation of the Union leaders opposing them. To do this, Jackson used his detailed knowledge of the gaps in the Blue Ridge and directed his troops to march through the Blue Ridge Tunnel.

== Replacement ==
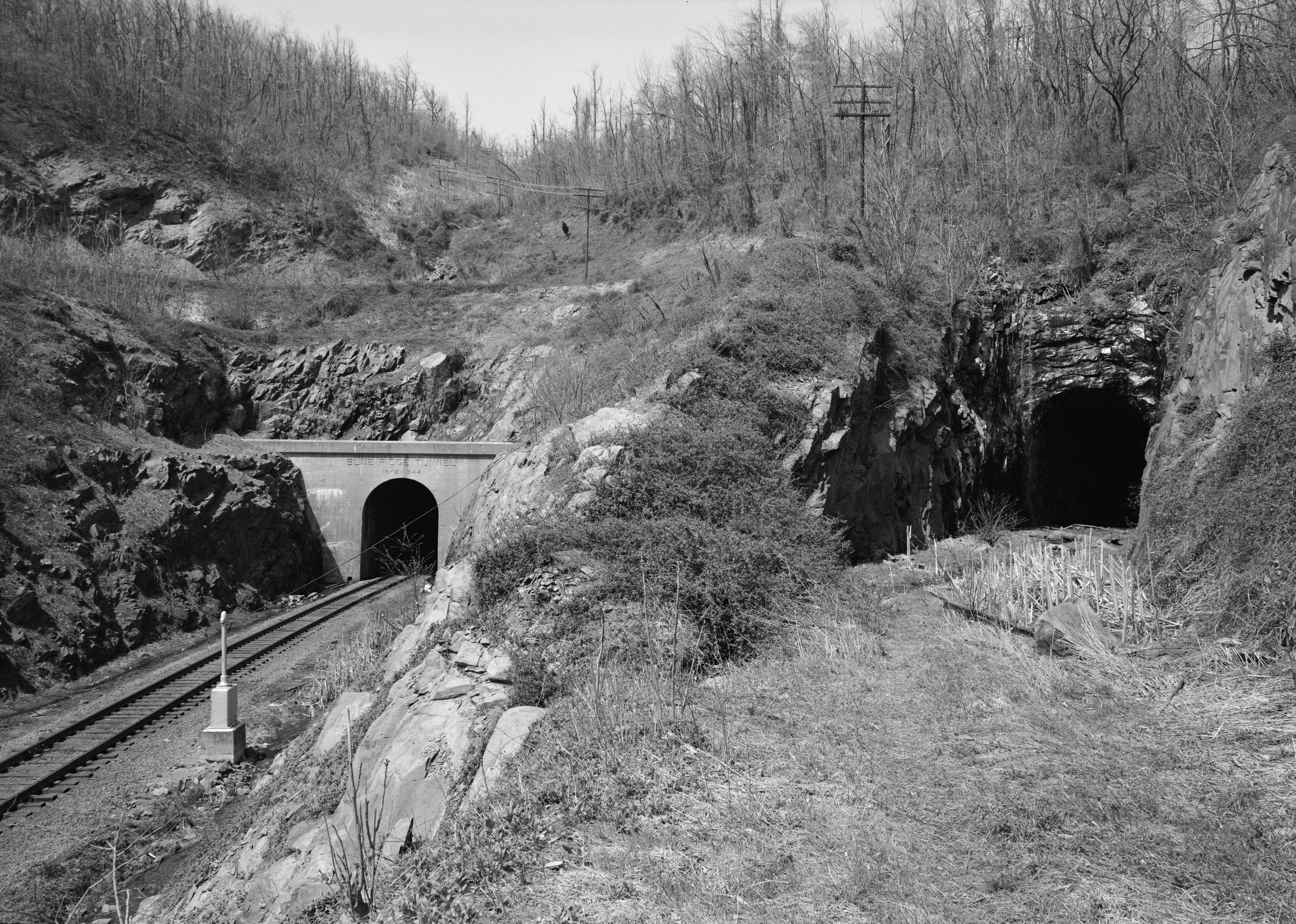
View of the replacement Blue Ridge Tunnel (left) constructed by the C&O in 1944. The old tunnel is visible to the right.

The Blue Ridge Railroad ceased to exist once the route across the mountains was completed, becoming a part of the Virginia Central Railroad. In 1868, the Virginia Central was merged with another state-chartered railroad, the Covington and Ohio Railroad, to create the Chesapeake and Ohio Railroad (renamed Chesapeake and Ohio Railway in 1878). This helped achieve Virginia's long-term goal of linking its navigable rivers of the Chesapeake Bay watershed with the Ohio River. The C&O Railroad was subsequently sold to Collis Potter Huntington.

The C&O replaced the Blue Ridge Tunnel in 1944 with a larger, parallel tunnel to accommodate the increased rail traffic of World War II. The new tunnel—which was 4 feet (1.2 m) off alignment when constructed—is now referred to as the Blue Ridge Tunnel. It is still in use by CSX Transportation, the Buckingham Branch Railroad and Amtrak.

== Phased construction ==
After the original tunnel was replaced, it became known as the Crozet Tunnel in honor of its remarkable engineer, for whom the nearby town of Crozet is named. As of 2022, it was slated for use as part of a rail trail project.

The Claudius Crozet Blue Ridge Tunnel Foundation secured a $749,000 grant through the Virginia Department of Transportation and the Commonwealth Transportation Board to begin Phase I of the project to reopen the long-closed tunnel with a bike path and hiking trail. Phase I will be a footpath from the former Afton rail depot to a concrete bulwark 700 feet into the tunnel. The first piece of the trail will begin and end on the east side of Afton Mountain.

"This is definitely safe where we're going," district supervisor Allen Hale said in 2015. "But once you get to the tunnel and someone walks through here and gets all the way up, they're going to want to go in... The ultimate goal … is to have the tunnel open all the way through to the west side to the Blue Ridge Mountains and have a trail connection to U.S. Route 250 on the other side," Hale said... According to the News & Advance archives, the $450,000 required for Phase II has already been raised. Hale hopes to begin Phase II some time this year. The date for Phase III has yet to be set. The Crozet Tunnel is open to foot traffic. The “Rails-To-Trails” walking/pedal cycling path is not yet, as of April 2021, complete to the tunnel.

== Present use ==
=== Mapping the tunnel ===
In the fall of 2017, a University of Virginia assistant professor and two graduate students used a ground-based autonomous robot to scan and map the tunnel using LiDAR. The result was a three-dimensional map of the tunnel which can be used for restoration or construction projects in the future.

=== Reopening of the tunnel ===
On the 21st September 2020, the tunnel was opened with an access trail. A Nelson County Parks and Recreation press release announced the Claudius Crozet Blue Ridge Tunnel Trail system would open from sunrise to sunset.

The project incorporates an access trail through the restored tunnel and new trailheads on both sides of the Blue Ridge with access for hikers, walkers, bicyclists, and others.

Eventually, the project will link existing trails, a long-distance trail system, and the historic communities on both sides of the mountains. The tunnel is also near the convergence of Skyline Drive, the Blue Ridge Parkway, the Appalachian Trail, and U.S. Bicycle Route 76. On the eastern side, there is a 12-spot parking lot at 215 Afton Depot Lane, while the western trailhead is near 483 Three Notched Mountain Highway, where there are 25 parking spaces and two oversized areas for small buses. There are no plans to light the tunnel, so visitors are urged to bring headlamps or flashlights.

A mini documentary about the reopening of the tunnel was released onto Youtube in March 2021. The tunnel was listed on the National Register of Historic Places in 2023.

== See also ==
- Brookville Tunnel
- Greenwood Tunnel
- Kingwood Tunnel, the Blue Ridge Tunnel's predecessor as longest tunnel in the United States
- List of tunnels documented by the Historic American Engineering Record in Virginia
