= List of tunnels documented by the Historic American Engineering Record in Virginia =

This is a list of tunnels documented by the Historic American Engineering Record in the U.S. state of Virginia.

== Tunnels ==
Survey No.	Name (as assigned by HAER)	Built	Documented	Carries	Crosses	Location	County	Coordinates
VA-2	Blue Ridge Railroad, Blue Ridge Tunnel (bypassed)	1858	1971	Blue Ridge Railroad	Rockfish Gap	Afton	Nelson	38°02′18″N 78°51′45″W
VA-3	Blue Ridge Railroad, Greenwood Tunnel (bypassed)	1853	1983	Blue Ridge Railroad		Greenwood	Albemarle County	38°03′14″N 78°46′23″W
VA-5	Chesapeake & Ohio Railroad, Blue Ridge Tunnel	1944	1983	Chesapeake and Ohio Railway	Rockfish Gap	Afton	Nelson	38°02′18″N 78°51′45″W
VA-9	Atlantic, Mississippi and Ohio Railroad, Jefferson Street Tunnel	1870	1971	Atlantic, Mississippi and Ohio Railroad	Jefferson Street	Lynchburg	Independent city	37°25′00″N 79°08′28″W
VA-18	Orange and Alexandria Railroad, Wilkes Street Tunnel	1851	1970	Orange and Alexandria Railroad	Wilkes Street	Alexandria	Independent city	38°48′00″N 77°02′38″W
VA-48-D	Colonial Parkway, Williamsburg Tunnel	1949	1988	Colonial Parkway	Colonial Williamsburg	Williamsburg	Independent city	37°16′23″N 76°41′58″W
VA-119	Skyline Drive, Marys Rock Tunnel	1932	1996	Skyline Drive	Mary's Rock	Luray	Rappahannock County	38°39′16″N 78°18′43″W

== See also ==
- List of bridges documented by the Historic American Engineering Record in Virginia
