= Chesapeake and Ohio Railroad =

Chesapeake and Ohio Railroad may refer to:

- Chesapeake and Ohio Railway, an American railroad company between 1878–1987
- Virginia Central Railroad, predecessor of the above, known as the Chesapeake and Ohio Railroad between 1868–1878
