= Virginia Central Railroad =

Railroad in Virginia

- Louisa Railroad (1836–1850); Chesapeake and Ohio Railroad (1868–1878)
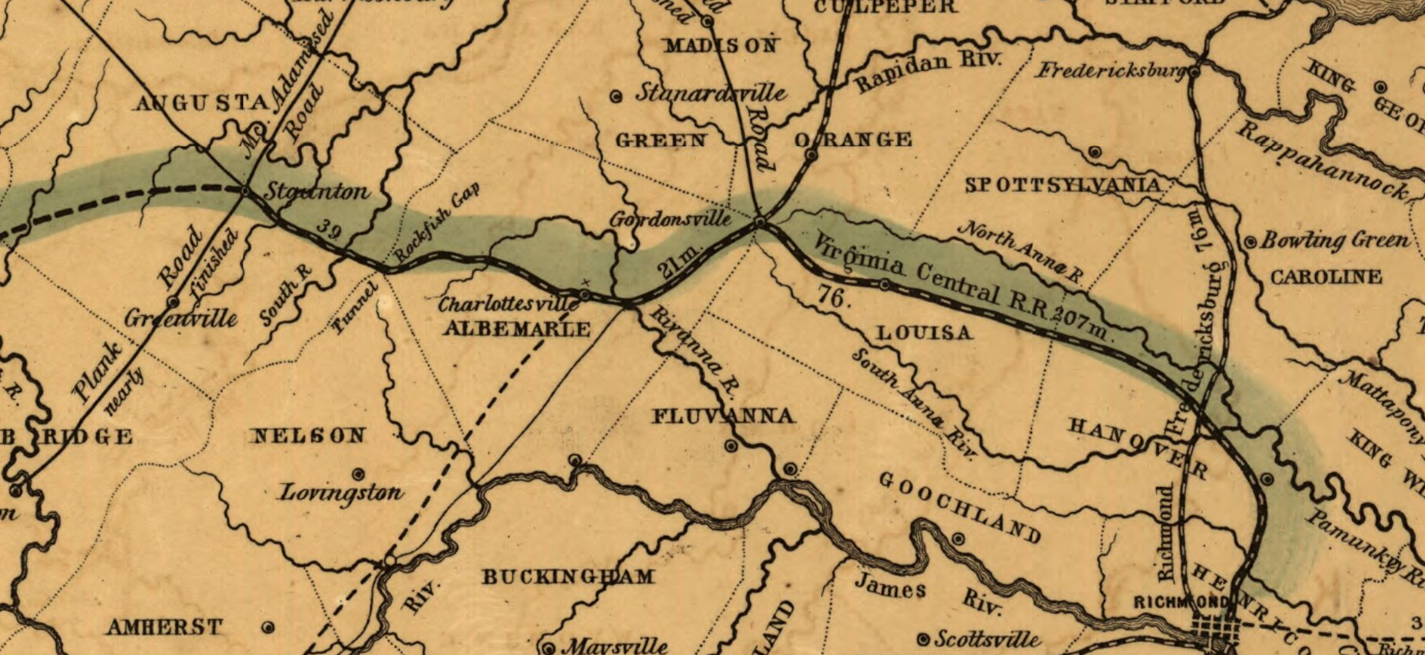

Overview
- Headquarters: Richmond, Virginia
- Reporting mark: VC
- Locale: Virginia
- Dates of operation: 1836–1878
- Successor: Chesapeake and Ohio Railway

Technical
- Track gauge: 1,435 mm (4 ft 8 1/2 in)
- Length: 206 miles (332 km)

The Virginia Central Railroad (reporting mark VC) was an early railroad in the U.S. state of Virginia that operated between 1850 and 1868 from Richmond westward for 206 miles (332 km) to Covington. Chartered in 1836 as the Louisa Railroad by the Virginia General Assembly, the railroad began near the Richmond, Fredericksburg and Potomac Railroad's line and expanded westward to Orange County, reaching Gordonsville by 1840. In 1849, the Blue Ridge Railroad was chartered to construct a line over the Blue Ridge Mountains for the Louisa Railroad which reached the base of the Blue Ridge in 1852. After a decision from the U.S. Supreme Court, the Louisa Railroad was allowed to expand eastward from a point near Doswell to Richmond. Most of the railroad was constructed by Irish immigrant labor, or enslaved African Americans who were typically leased out by their enslavers to individuals contracted to build portions of the railroad.

Renamed as the Virginia Central Railroad in 1850, the railroad bypassed the under construction Blue Ridge Railroad via a temporary track built over Rockfish Gap. This connected the railroad's eastern division with its expanding line across the Blue Ridge in the Shenandoah Valley. Having reached Clifton Forge by 1857, the railroad began operating the completed Blue Ridge Railroad in 1858 and continued preparing for further expansion until the beginning of the American Civil War in 1861. As a prime target for Federal raids by Union Cavalry, the railroad faced significant action against it during the war. Although the war left the railroad with only a fraction of its line left operable, the railroad was running over its entire pre-war length by July 1865.

After the war, both longtime president Edmund Fontaine and former Confederate General Williams Carter Wickham served as president of the Virginia Central and oversaw its expansion towards Covington. The Chesapeake and Ohio Railroad was formed in 1868 from the merger of the Virginia Central Railroad and the Covington and Ohio Railroad, and had expanded westward to the Ohio River by 1873 after new financing from Collis P. Huntington was recruited. The new railroad (reorganized as the Chesapeake and Ohio Railway in 1878) expanded eastward in the 1880s via the Peninsula Subdivision to Newport News. The Chesapeake and Ohio operated for over one hundred years until it was reorganized through merger as CSX Transportation in the 1980s. Today, CSX, Amtrak, and the Buckingham Branch Railroad still use portions of the old Virginia Central line for freight and passenger rail service.

== Louisa Railroad ==
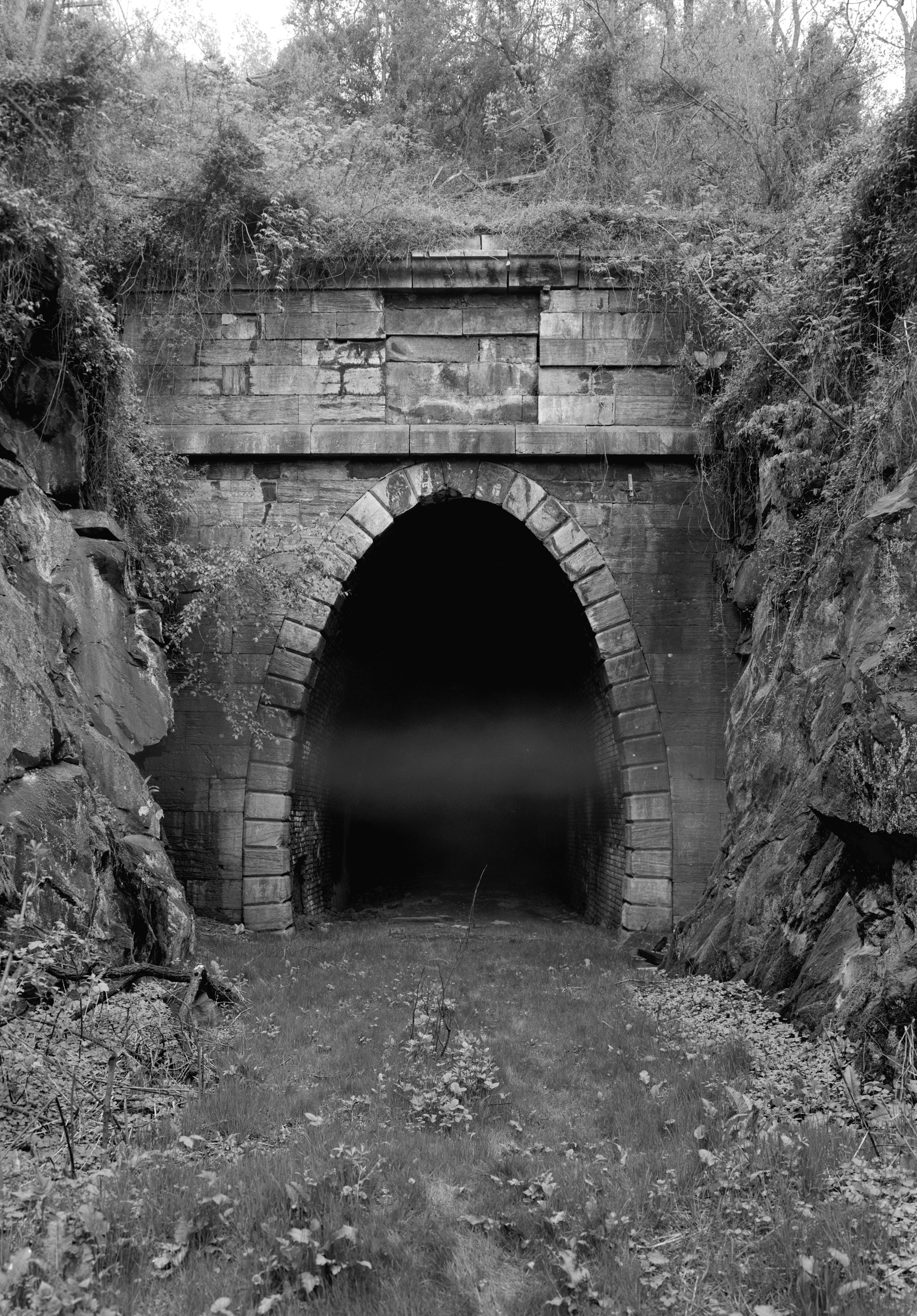
Crozet's Blue Ridge Tunnel seen here after its abandonment and replacement during World War II by the Chesapeake and Ohio Railway.

The Virginia General Assembly passed on February 18, 1836, an act to incorporate the Louisa Railroad company to construct a rail line extending from the Richmond, Fredericksburg and Potomac Railroad (RF&P) westward. The railroad, as specified by the original charter, was to connect with the RF&P near Taylorsville, at what would become Hanover Junction, and extend westward, passing the Louisa courthouse, to Orange County at the base of the Southwest Mountains. The Virginia Board of Public Works owned two-fifths of the total $300,000 ($11,610,000 today) stock sold to finance the railroad's initial construction.

Construction of the Louisa Railroad began in October 1836, reaching the Louisa courthouse by 1839, and by 1840 had reached Gordonsville. The railroad had been planned by its original charter to build across the Blue Ridge Mountains to Harrisonburg, but in 1839, the Commonwealth requested a survey to be conducted to determine a feasible route to Staunton by way of Charlottesville. Ultimately, this route, which passed over the mountains at Rockfish Gap, was chosen as a better alternative than the original plan to cross at Swift Run Gap to the north. In 1847, the charter was modified by the Assembly to provide for the railroad's construction to the eastern base of the Blue Ridge, and in 1849, the Blue Ridge Railroad was chartered to cross the mountains at Rockfish Gap to Waynesboro. Claudius Crozet was appointed Chief Engineer of the Blue Ridge Railroad, and under his leadership and direction, the railroad began construction over the Blue Ridge using a series of four tunnels. Meanwhile, the Louisa Railroad had reached the Rivanna River near Charlottesville by 1850 and by 1852 had reached Mechums River, near the eastern end of the Blue Ridge Railroad.

Operation of the Louisa Railroad was initially handled by the RF&P, beginning with the first operation of a train over Louisa Railroad tracks on December 20, 1837. This condition continued until June 1847, when the Louisa Railroad took over operations.

The eastern terminus of the Louisa Railroad was originally at Hanover Junction (now known as Doswell) with the RF&P Railroad. The charter of that line protected it from construction of a parallel competitor, but an act by the Virginia General Assembly in 1848 authorized the extension of the Louisa Railroad easterly through Hanover and Henrico Counties to reach Richmond. This act was protested by the RF&P for violating the earlier decree of the Assembly against a parallel competitor. The RF&P's claim was originally overturned by a Virginia State Court, which ruled that the Assembly retained the right to authorize construction of other railroads between Richmond and Fredericksburg, and that the original charter of the RF&P only applied to the transportation of passengers. The decision of the court was appealed and eventually reached the U.S. Supreme Court in Richmond, Fredericksburg and Potomac Railroad Company v. Louisa Railroad Company, which ruled in favor of the Louisa Railroad, upholding the state court's decision.

The first president of the Louisa Railroad was Frederick Overton Harris, a native of Louisa County, who served until 1841. After Harris' term, Charles Y. Kimbrough, also from Louisa, served until 1845, when Edmund Fontaine was elected to office upon Kimbrough's death. Edmund Fontaine would continue to serve as president of the Louisa Railroad and its successor until after the American Civil War.

== Further expansion as the Virginia Central ==
While the Blue Ridge Mountain section was being breached, the Louisa Railroad was busy building westward from the western foot of the mountains, across the Shenandoah Valley to Staunton. In January 1850, the Commonwealth authorized the Louisa Railroad to increase its stock in order to build from Staunton to Covington. On February 2, 1850, the Louisa Railroad, having expanded greatly since its beginnings in Louisa and Hanover counties, was renamed as the Virginia Central Railroad.

Tunnels on the Virginia Central Railroad
Name (East to West)	Feet	Meters
Blue Ridge Mountains (Note: Sources vary as to the length of these tunnels, the most common ranges are as follows: Greenwood: 535.5–538 feet (163.2–164.0 m); Brooksville: 864–869 feet (263–265 m); Little Rock: 100 feet (30 m); Blue Ridge: 4,262–4,273 feet (1,299–1,302 m))
Greenwood	536	163
Brooksville	864	263
Little Rock	100	30
Blue Ridge	4,263	1,299
Ridge-and-Valley Appalachians (Note: The length of these tunnels also vary according to source, the most common ranges are as follows: Millborough: 1,303–1,335 feet (397–407 m); Mason's: 303–323 feet (92–98 m); Coleman's: 353–368 feet (108–112 m)) (Note: Lick Run Tunnel, a fourth tunnel along this western section located between Millborough and Mason's tunnels, was not constructed until 1872 under the Chesapeake and Ohio Railroad.)
Millborough	1,335	407
Mason's	323	98
Coleman's	355	108

In order to connect the eastern and western divisions of the railroad at this time divided by the unfinished Blue Ridge Railroad, a temporary track over Rockfish Gap was proposed by the railroad's chief engineer, Charles Ellet, Jr., and by 1854 had been constructed and was in use. Built over and around the under construction Blue Ridge Tunnel, this 4.38-mile-long (7.05 km) track, called the Mountain Track, included steep grades (maximum 5.6% with a ruling grade of 5.3%) and sharp curves (minimum radius of 300 feet (91 m)), thereby limiting speeds to around 5–7 miles per hour (8.0–11.3 km/h). Three small tank locomotives were ordered for the temporary track, one of which was supplied by the Tredegar Iron Works of Richmond, the Joseph R. Anderson, and two from Baldwin Locomotive Works of Philadelphia, the Baldwin and C.R. Mason. A second temporary track 1/2-mile-long (0.80 km) around the Brooksville Tunnel and a third 3/4-mile-long (1.2 km) around Robertson's hollow were also constructed. The temporary tracks successfully joined the railroad and by eliminating the extra cost and effort of removing freight and passengers from trains for transport over the mountains, facilitated further growth and expansion westward.

Construction continued from Staunton through a water gap near Goshen at Great North Mountain by 1855, and had reached Millboro by 1856. This western section of the line included an additional three tunnels, and a temporary track approximately 1.25 miles (2.01 km) long was used at Millboro while the tunnel was being completed. By 1857, the railroad had reached a point known as Jackson's River Station, at the foot of the Alleghany Mountains. This location would later be known as Clifton Forge and become a division point for the Chesapeake and Ohio Railway.

The temporary track over Rockfish Gap was used until the Blue Ridge Tunnel's opening in April 1858, and the last train to use the temporary track did so on the evening of April 12. That night, the connection with the completed Blue Ridge Railroad was made, and on the morning of the 13th, the mail train was the first train routed through the tunnel. With the tunnel in use, the temporary track was promptly torn up. At the time of the Blue Ridge Tunnel's completion, it was the longest tunnel in the United States and the first tunnel in the country to be completed without the use of vertical shafts. Although the Virginia Central did not own the Blue Ridge Railroad, it was granted the right to operate it from the Commonwealth of Virginia in return for an annual fee.

In 1859, the Virginia Central's line carried 134,883 passengers throughout the year, and hauled 64,177 tons of freight. The road connected Richmond to a point about 10 miles (16 km) east of Covington, where the proposed Covington and Ohio Railroad would have started, a distance of approximately 195 miles (314 km). In February 1853, the Commonwealth of Virginia had chartered the Covington and Ohio Railroad to extend the line completed by the Virginia Central westward across the Alleghany Mountains to the Ohio River. This company began work in 1855 and completed important grading work on the Alleghany grade, including the construction of numerous tunnels, and, to a lesser extent, in the areas around Charleston and the Kanawha River. However, as the American Civil War began in 1861, westward expansion came to a halt and the Covington and Ohio's line remained incomplete.

== Civil War ==
Rolling Stock During the Civil War
Type	1861	1862	1863	1864
Passenger	19	16	16	16
Mail and Baggage	12	8	8	8
Conductor Cars	3	8	8	6
Box and Stock Cars	150	101	110	89
Platform and Gondola Cars	30	27	36	36
Hay Cars	8	4	4	2
Gravel and Sand Cars	22	22	22	22
Total	244	186	204	179

The Virginia Central was one of the most important railroads for the Confederacy during the war, as it linked the fertile Shenandoah farmland of Virginia to Richmond and points eastward, enabling supplies and troops to easily be transported to nearby campaigns. The Blue Ridge tunnels and the Virginia Central were key tools in the fast mobilization of Confederate General Stonewall Jackson's famous "foot cavalry". Soon after the beginning of the war, the Virginia Central contracted with the Confederate States Postal Service, as it had done with the U.S. Postal Service before the war, to carry mail over its line. This service, along with passenger and general goods transport, became less reliable as the transport of military goods and troops took precedence.

As the war progressed, the railroad continually fell into a state of disrepair due to its constant use and the limited availability of supplies for upkeep. Union raids also destroyed many sections of the line, including the majority of the railroad's depots, with notable exceptions for those at Gordonsville and Charlottesville, two key points of trade. The defeat of Jubal Early's forces at Waynesboro led to the destruction of much of the bridges and line between Staunton and Keswick, and as Union armies converged on Richmond, further damage was done to the eastern section of the railroad. By the end of the war, the railroad operated less than 20 miles (32 km) of track and held only $40 ($841.3 today) in gold.

During the Peninsula Campaign of 1862, the South Anna River bridge was destroyed by Union cavalry and the Virginia Central's line between Hanover and Atlee was torn up. Although this and numerous other raids caused significant damage, the damage was soon repaired and the line was generally kept in good use. May 1863 saw another raid against the line, during which the Louisa Court House was attacked and the Hanover depot burned. During Ulysses S. Grant's Overland Campaign of 1864, Phillip Sheridan was ordered, along with nearly 8,000 men, to proceed westward to join forces with David Hunter in Charlottesville, destroying as much of the Virginia Central as possible along the way. From Charlottesville, the combined force would advance towards Richmond from the west. Robert E. Lee responded by sending cavalry under the command of Wade Hampton and Fitzhugh Lee, who would meet Sheridan on June 11 at Trevilian Station on the Virginia Central's line. Confederate forces succeeded in pushing Sheridan back, who at 10:00 pm of the 12th withdrew towards the Army of the Potomac. Little damage was done to the tracks during the raid, and the damage was soon repaired and the line returned to operation.

== Rebuilding ==
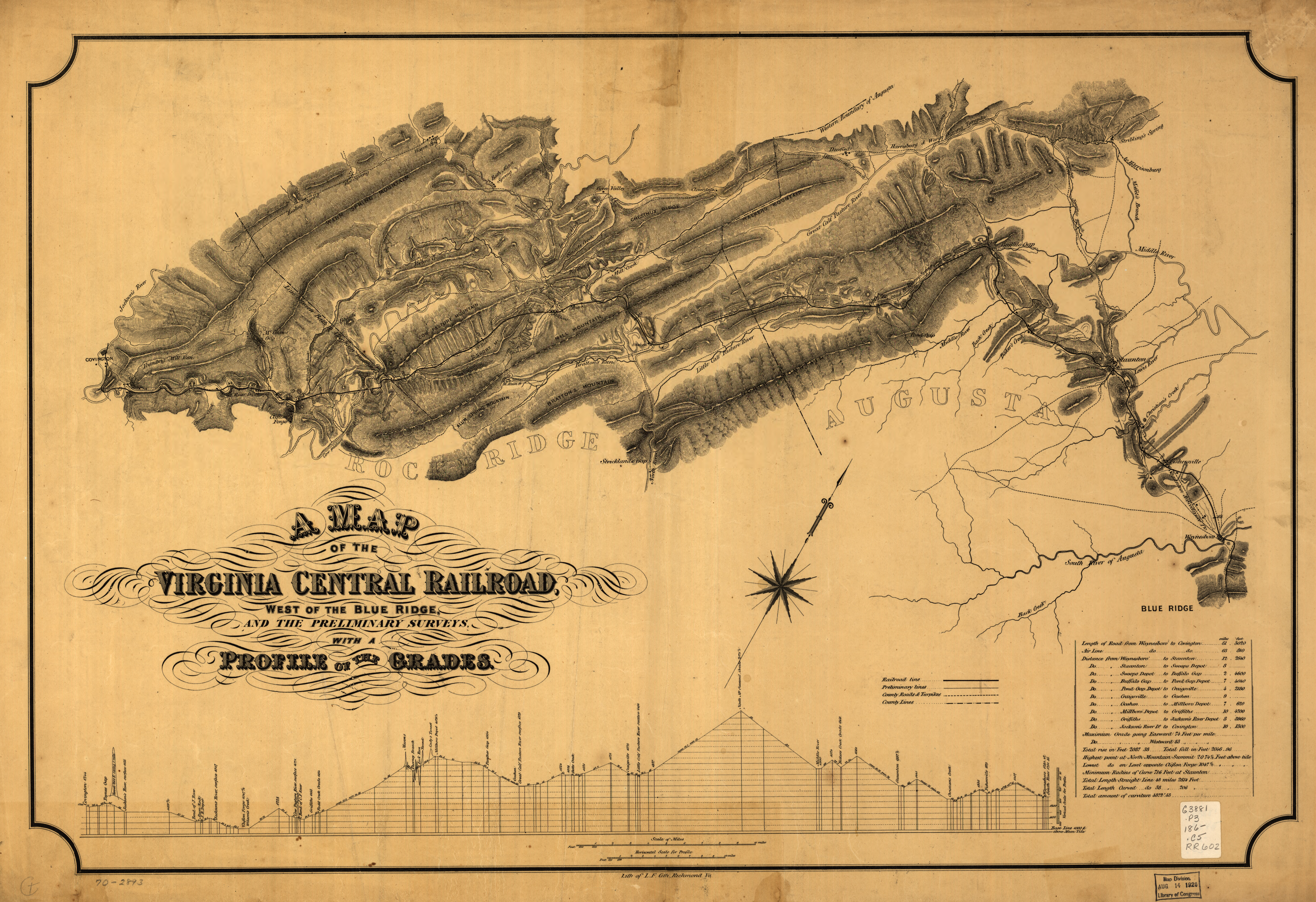
1860 map of the Virginia Central Railroad west of the Blue Ridge

Reconstruction of the Virginia Central began soon after the Confederacy's collapse, and under the permission of General Edward Ord, repairs commenced on April 21, 1865. Construction of temporary bridges and repairs were made swiftly, enabling trains to run to the Rivanna River by May. Temporary overland stage and wagon routes were set up to bypass inoperable sections of the railroad as repairs were made and provided for the transportation of goods and passengers. By the end of July, trains were able to run to the western terminus of Jackson's River Station. The Virginia Central's rolling stock had suffered throughout the Civil War, and the operable equipment had dwindled to an amount insufficient to provide for demand. To help solve this issue, four locomotives and forty cars were rented from the government at a price of $20 and $2 ($420.65 and $42.07 today) each per day respectively. The Beaverdam Depot was rebuilt in 1866.

Williams Carter Wickham, President of the Virginia Central (1865-1866) and Chesapeake and Ohio Railroads.

In November 1865, an election for a new president of the company was held, and former Confederate General Williams Carter Wickham was elected over longtime president Edmund Fontaine by 364 votes. In recognition of Fontaine's dedication and service to the railroad, the stockholders resolved to grant Fontaine and his family free tickets for life. Fontaine was unanimously reelected as president of the company in 1866 and 1867.

== Chesapeake and Ohio Railroad ==
Since before the Civil War, the section of the line between Jackson's River Station and Covington, a distance of about 10 miles (16 km), had remained incomplete. This section was necessary for further westward expansion, and by July 31, 1867, the last of the track was laid and placed in operation. Reaching Covington enabled connection with the Covington and Ohio railroad, which at that time was still under construction, and provided for the future merging of the two companies as specified by an act of the Virginia General Assembly passed on March 1, 1867.

On August 31, 1868, the Virginia Central was merged with the Covington and Ohio to form the new Chesapeake and Ohio (C&O) Railroad (reorganized as the Chesapeake and Ohio Railway in 1878), and Wickham was elected as president. Wickham realized the need to find adequate financing to resume the westward work through the challenging mountainous terrain, as the Virginia Board of Public Works was no longer in a position to help as it had in the past. After failing in the impoverished southern states and with British investors, Wickham found new capital and financing by recruiting Collis P. Huntington, one of the so-called "Big Four", a group of businessmen who had recently completed the western portion of the transcontinental railroad. Under Huntington's leadership, and with millions in new financing from New York City, westward construction resumed in 1868.

Having long paid tolls for the use of the state-owned Blue Ridge Railroad, the C&O arranged to purchase the line from the Commonwealth of Virginia and assumed full ownership on April 1, 1870. In all, the Virginia Central and the C&O paid around $900,000 ($22,914,473.68 today) to the Commonwealth, including both the purchase price and previous fees for use, which was significantly less than the Commonwealth's expenditure of $1,694,870.85 ($43,152,303.88 today) in building the line.

Construction of the old Covington and Ohio line began from Huntington, West Virginia on the western end and Covington on the eastern end, and progressed towards the middle. By July 1869, construction of the line westward had reached White Sulphur Springs, West Virginia, and with the use of three temporary tracks around two unfinished tunnels and an embankment, the entire line of 227 miles (365 km) from Richmond to White Sulphur Springs could be traveled. In August 1871, a locomotive named the Greenbrier was floated down the Ohio River to aid in the construction of the line from the western side. The final spike ceremony for the 428-mile (689 km) long line from Richmond to the Ohio River was held on January 29, 1873, at Hawk's Nest railroad bridge in the New River Valley, near the town of Ansted in Fayette County, West Virginia. The last spike was driven by C.R. Mason, who had also driven the first spike of the Louisa Railroad and had held various positions over the course of the Virginia Central's and C&O's history.

Huntington was also aware of the potential to ship eastbound coal from West Virginia's untapped natural resources with the completion of the new railroad. His agents began acquiring property in Warwick County in eastern Virginia. In the 1880s, he oversaw the extension of the C&O's new Peninsula Subdivision, which extended from the Church Hill Tunnel in Richmond southeast down the peninsula through Williamsburg to Newport News, where the company developed coal piers on the harbors of Hampton Roads and Newport News.

The Richmond and Alleghany Railroad, which ran from Clifton Forge to Richmond following the James River and the old James River and Kanawha Canal, was merged into the Chesapeake and Ohio in 1889. On this line, trains descended nearly 1,000 feet (300 m) in elevation to Richmond following the path of the river. The addition of the "James River Line" allowed the C&O to avoid the heavier grades of the old Virginia Central's line to the north and became the principal artery of eastbound coal transportation down to the present day, with the earlier Virginia Central line used for westbound empty hoppers. From the convergence of the lines in Richmond, both eastbound and westbound coal trains utilized the Peninsula Subdivision through Williamsburg to service the coal piers in the East End of Newport News.

== Modern times and other uses ==
After the Chesapeake and Ohio was consolidated with several other large railroads in the 1980s to form CSX Transportation, the line built by the Virginia Central from Staunton to Clifton Forge was considered for abandonment. CSX, however, decided to keep the line in order to route empty coal trains westward, which, although intended for times of excess traffic, has become common practice. In addition to CSX, portions of the old Virginia Central line are in use by Amtrak's Cardinal from Gordonsville to Clifton Forge, and the Buckingham Branch Railroad, a Virginia-based short-line railroad that leases the line from CSX. The line will also be used for the Amtrak Commonwealth Corridor connecting Newport News to Richmond, Charlottesville, Roanoke, and Lynchburg starting mid-late 2020s.

Many years after the original Virginia Central became part of the Chesapeake and Ohio in 1868, another railroad between Fredericksburg and Orange used the name "Virginia Central." The Potomac, Fredericksburg & Piedmont Railroad Company (PF&P) operated 38 miles (61 km) of 3-foot (910 mm) gauge railroad between Fredericksburg (with a connection to the RF&P Railroad) and Orange (with a connection to the Orange & Alexandria Railroad). It operated as narrow gauge until 1926, when the line was standard gauged and the name changed to the Virginia Central Railway. In 1937, the entire line was abandoned except for a 1 mile (1.6 km) segment in Fredericksburg which lasted until 1984.
