= Edward Beyer =

German-American painter (1820–1865)

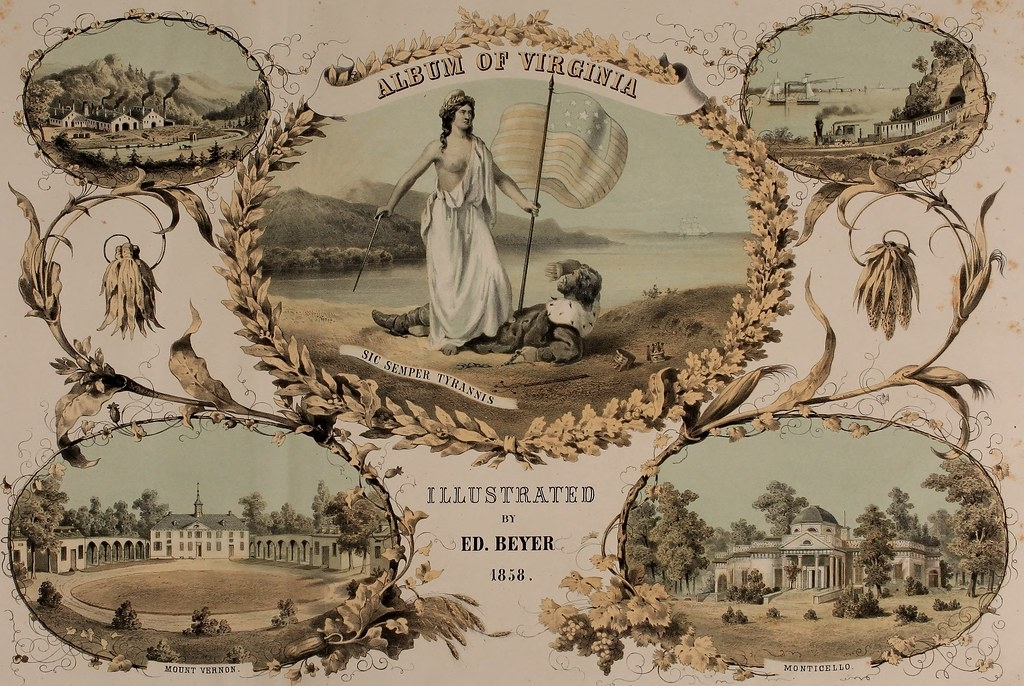
Beyer's Album of Virginia, 1857

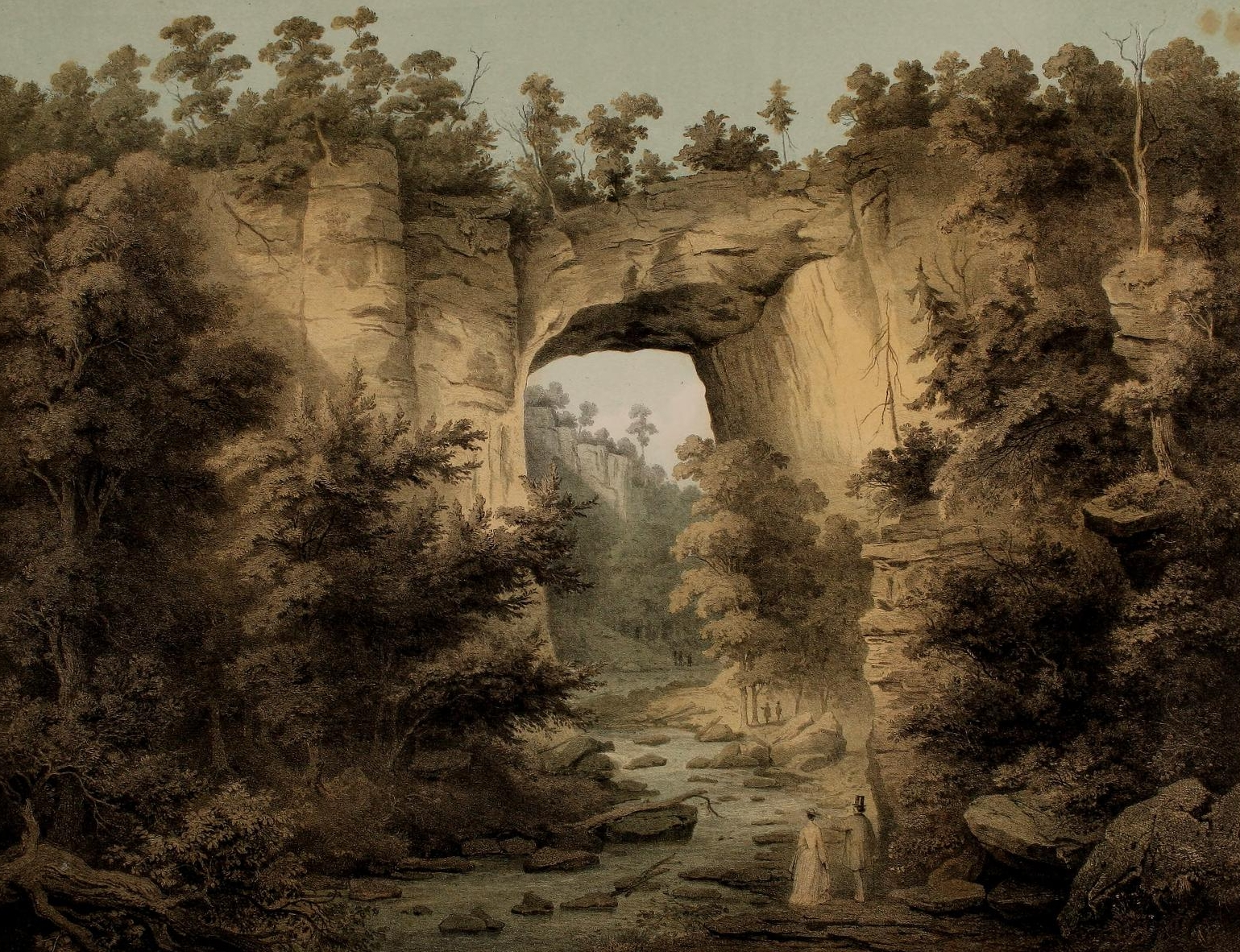
Natural Bridge, Virginia by Beyer

Edward Beyer (1820–1865) was a German landscape painter who was active in the United States and became known for his depiction of the Antebellum South.

== Biography ==
He was born Eduard Beyer in Aachen, and was a graduate of the Düsseldorf Academy of Art, or the Kunstakademie Düsseldorf, where he studied between 1837 and 1838 under Joseph Wintergerst and Rudolf Wiegmann. He traveled to the United States in 1848 with his wife, living first in Newark, New Jersey and later in Philadelphia, Pennsylvania and Cincinnati, Ohio.

He visited Virginia in 1854 and stayed until about 1856 or 1857 sketching and painting a number of scenes that would appear in his "Album of Virginia" (1857).

Edward Beyer eventually returned to Germany and died at Munich in 1865.

== Artistic style ==
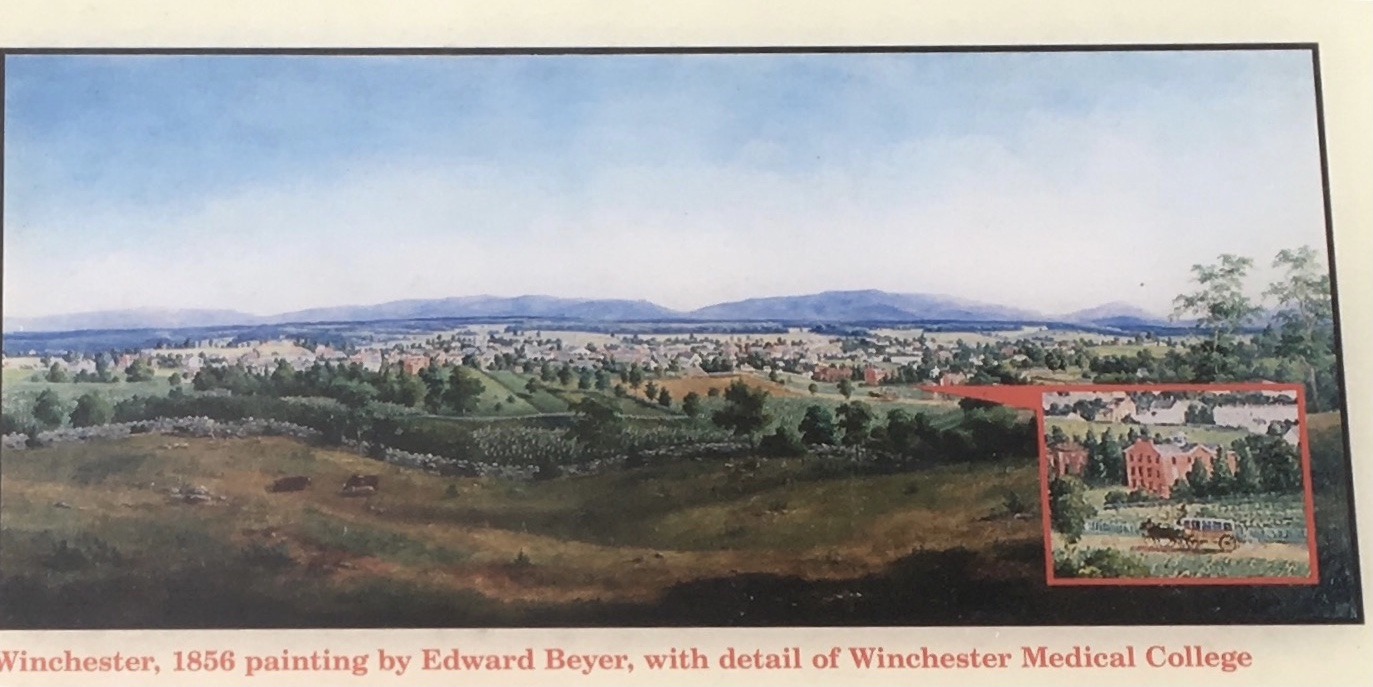
Winchester Medical College, Winchester, Virginia (detail). Edward Beyer, 1856.

Beyer's style was formed at the Dusseldorf Academy with its tradition of Classicism and Romanticism and critics hold a favorable view of Beyer's artistic endeavors.

In his painting of the Bellevue Plantation near Ridgeway, Henry County, Virginia, a homestead of the Andrew and Maria Lewis family, Beyer depicts eight slaves toiling in a wheat field. The painting is accomplished "in the dramatic style of the Dusseldorf Academy, which emphasized atmosphere, action and drama."

Some of his works comprised industrial scenes such as railroads and bridges, juxtaposing romanticism and realism.

The painting of what was Charleston, Virginia in 1854 was declared a painting trifecta by Antiques Roadshow (U.S. TV series) appraiser Colleene Fesko. Fesko said she was amazed when she saw the piece and had to pull out her glasses to fully examine in detail the panoramic work. While in Charleston, Beyer was offered a commission from a number of businessmen in the community. They had to have a lottery to decide who would own the painting, and it stayed with the same family ever since. Fesko said that Beyer created 40 panoramic landscape paintings of Virginia towns in the mid-19th century.

Art historians lauded Beyer's "delicate and precise style" and "characteristic refinement of proportion."

== List of works ==
- Charleston, Virginia (now West Virginia)
- Natural Bridge (Virginia)
- Harper's Ferry from Jefferson Rock
- Rockfish Gap and the Mountain House
- The High Bridge near Farmville
- The drums. The tapestry Room. Weyers Cave
- Stribling Springs
- Burner's White Sulphur Spr. Shenandoah Co.
- White Sulphur Spring Montgomery
- View from the Peak of Otter
- View from the Hawks Nest
- Little tunnel near Shawsville, Va. & T.R.R.
- Old Sweet Springs
- Rockbridge Alum Spring
- Yellow Sulphur Springs
- Blue Sulphur Spring
- Falling Springs
- View from Gambles Hill
- Bullard Rock on the New River
- View's of Weyer's Cave
- Salt Sulphur Spring
- Red Sulphur Spring
- Salt Pond from the Salt Pond Knob
- Kanawha Fall
- U.S. Armory in Harpers Ferry
- Viaduct on Cheat River B & O.R.R.
- White Sulphur Springs
- Fauquier White Sulphur Springs
- Hot Springs
- Old Point Comfort. Hygeia Hotel
- View from Little Sewell Mountain
- James River Canal near the mouth of the North River
- View of the Peaks of Otter
- Red Sweet Springs
- Warm Springs.

== Gallery ==
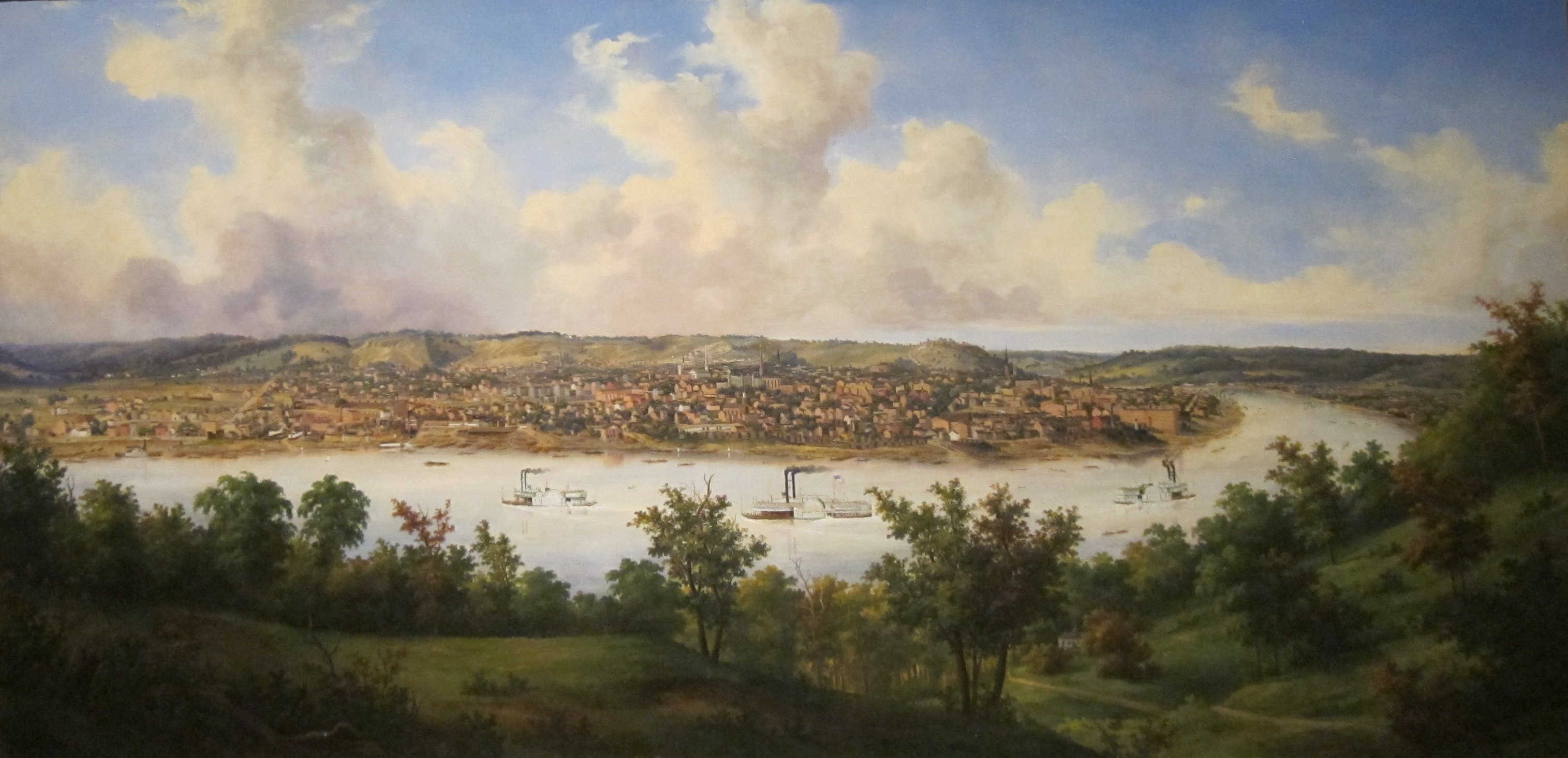
View of Cincinnati

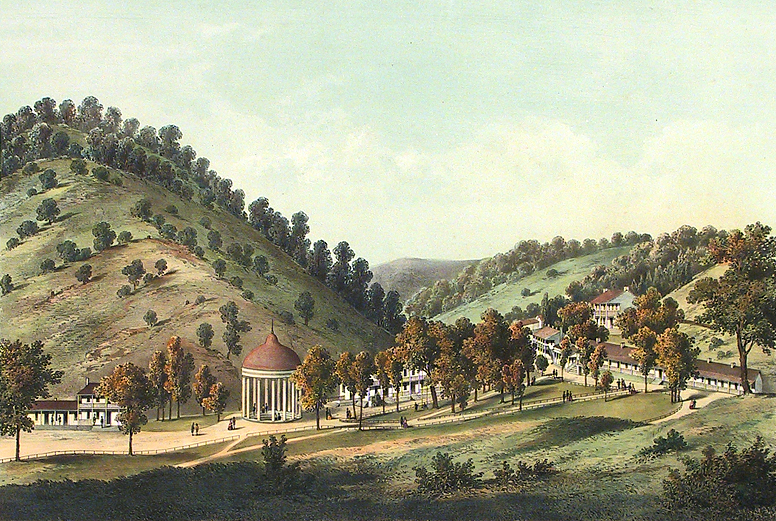
Red Sulphur Springs

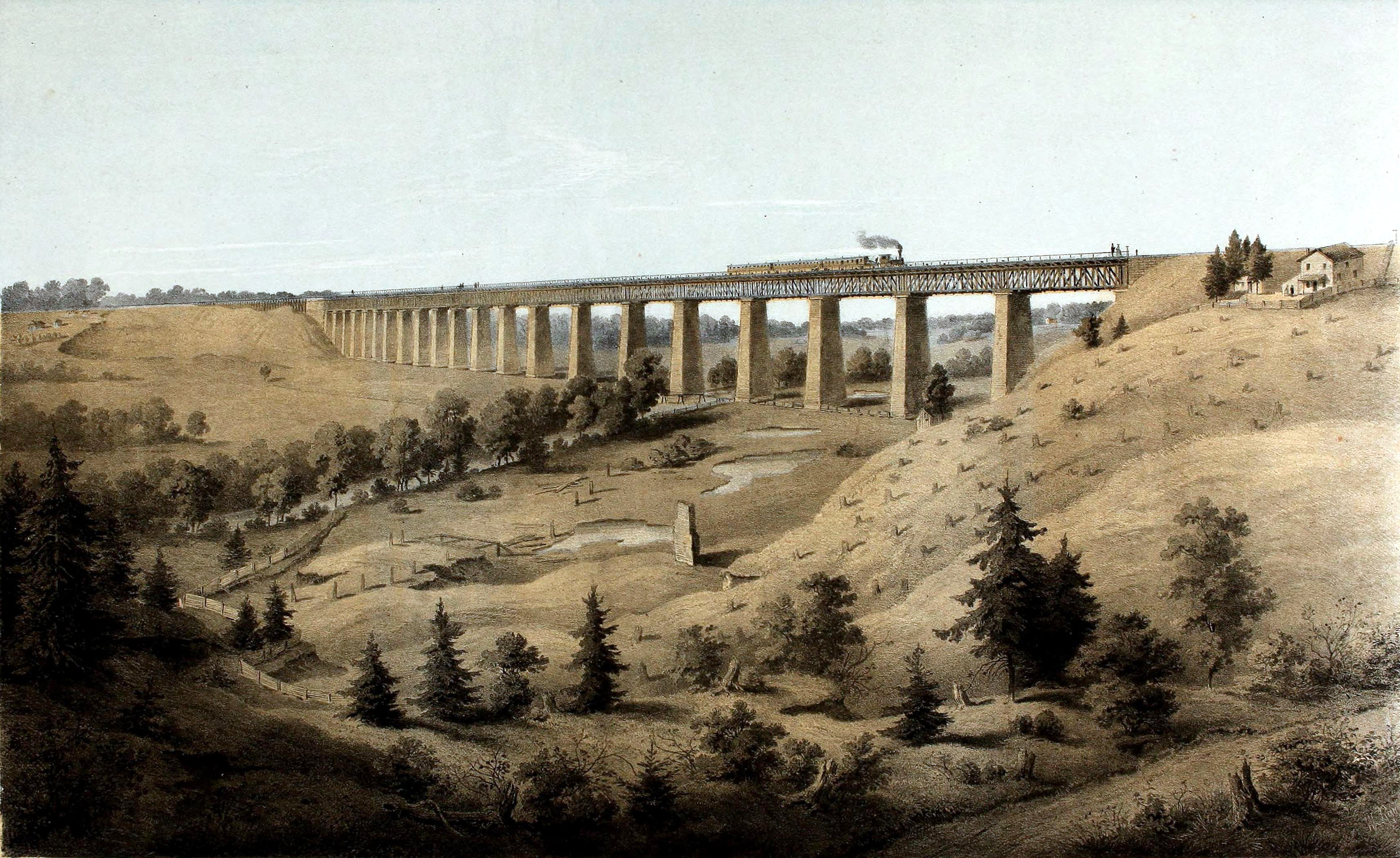
The High Bridge Near Farmville

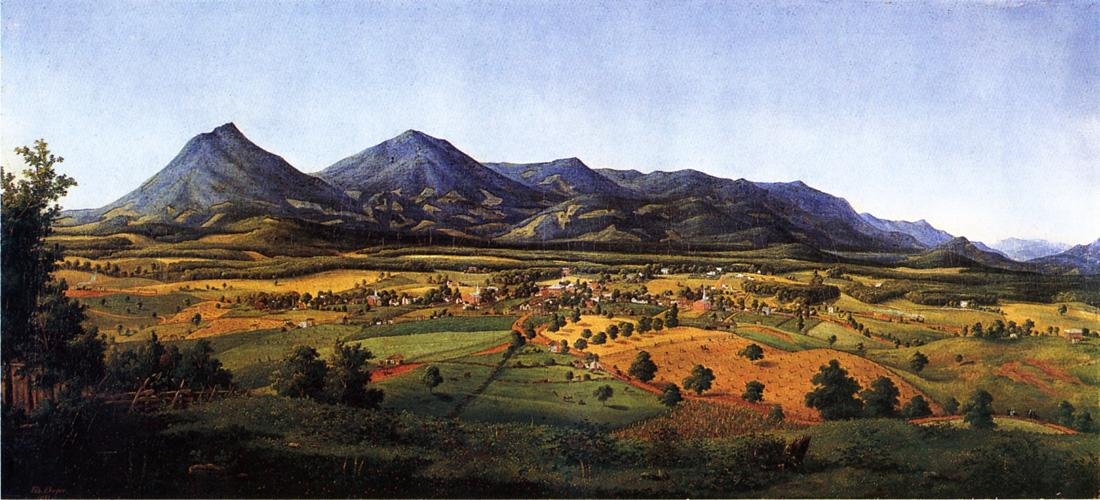
The Peaks of Otter and the Town of Liberty

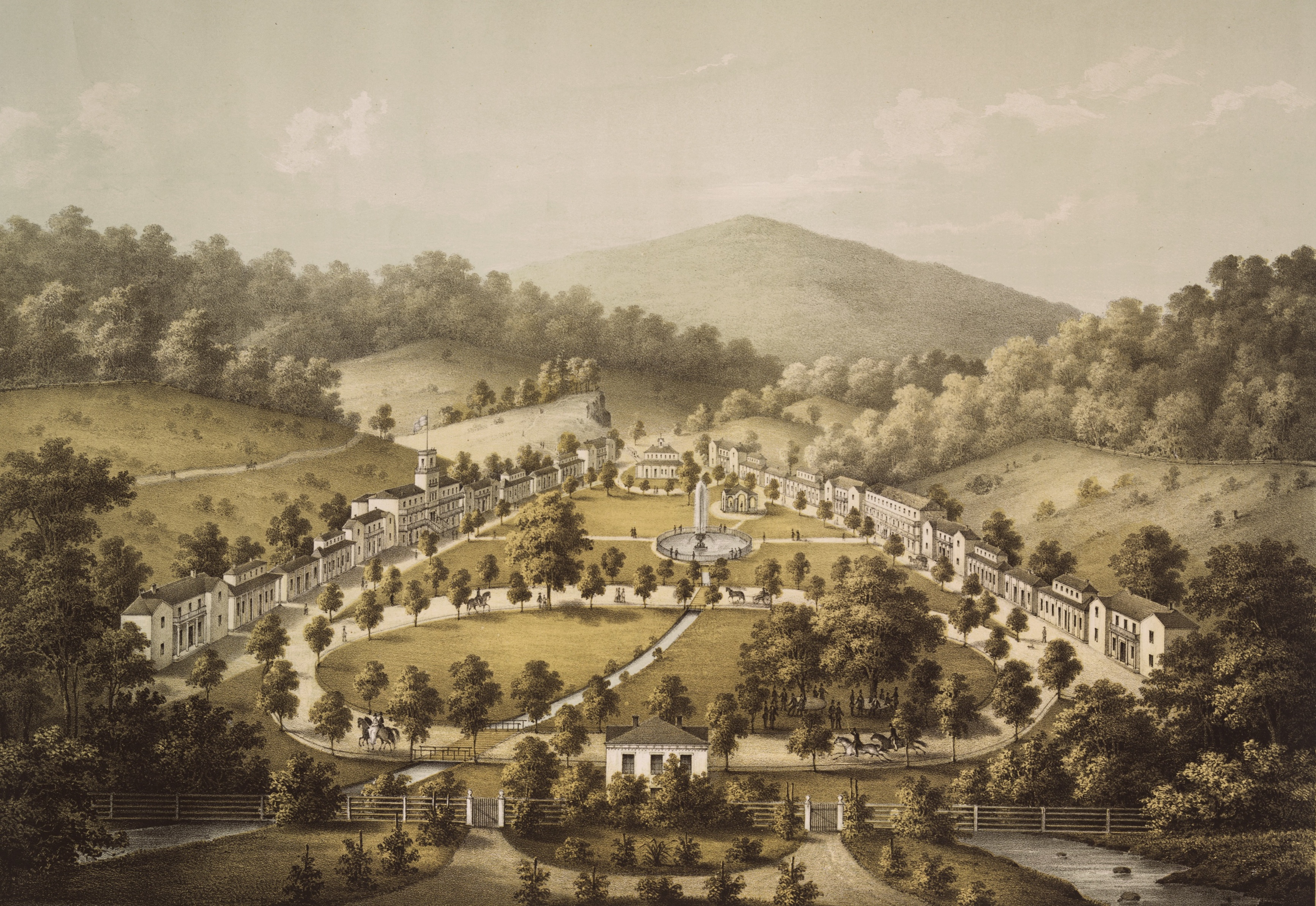
Montgomery White Sulphur Springs

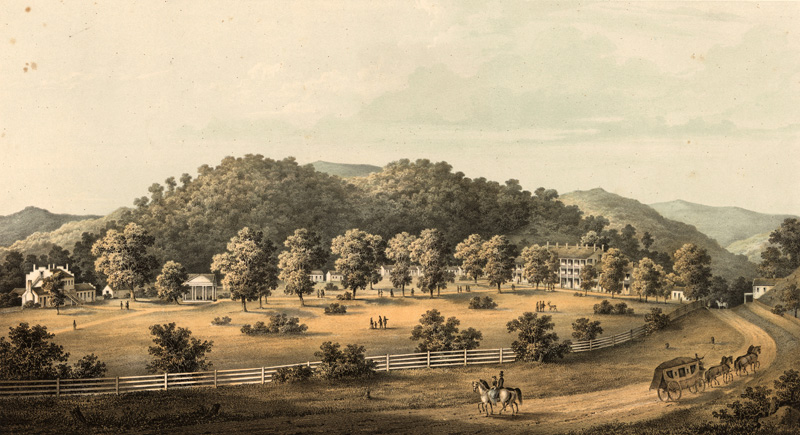
Blue Sulphur Springs Resort

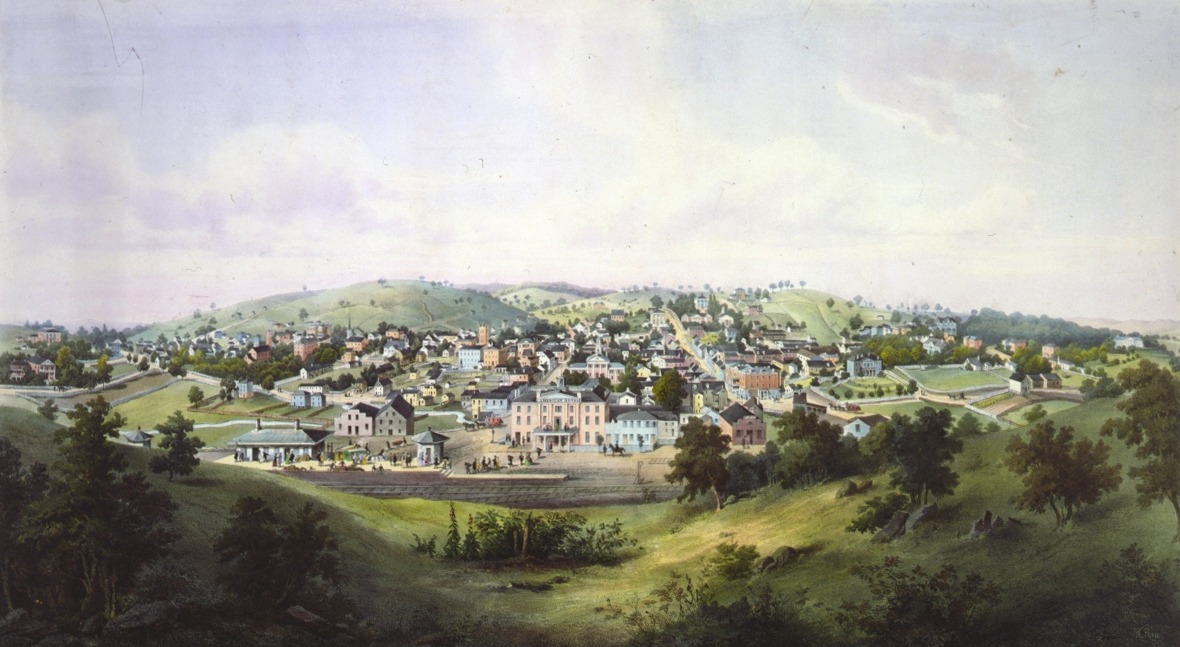
Staunton, Va.

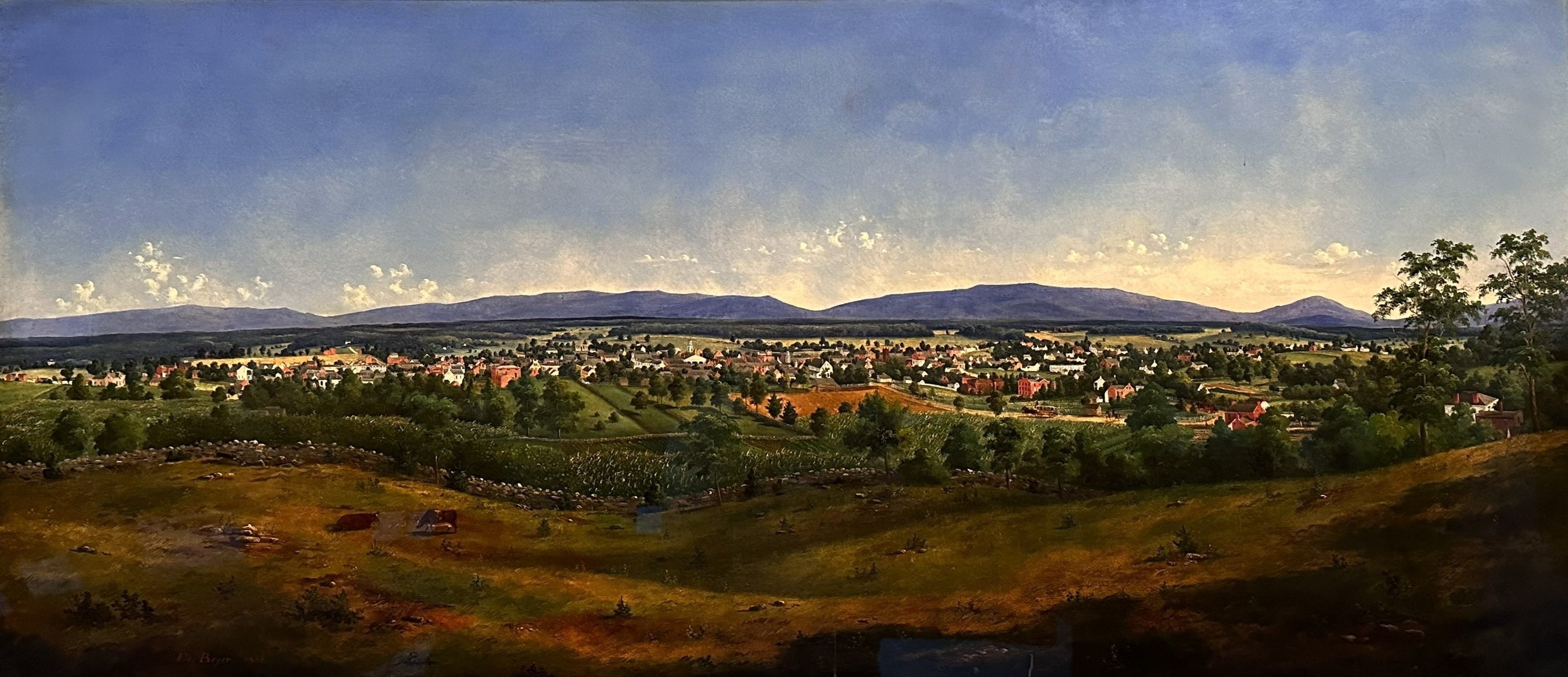
Winchester, VA (1856)
