= Greenwood Tunnel =

Historic railroad tunnel built in 1853

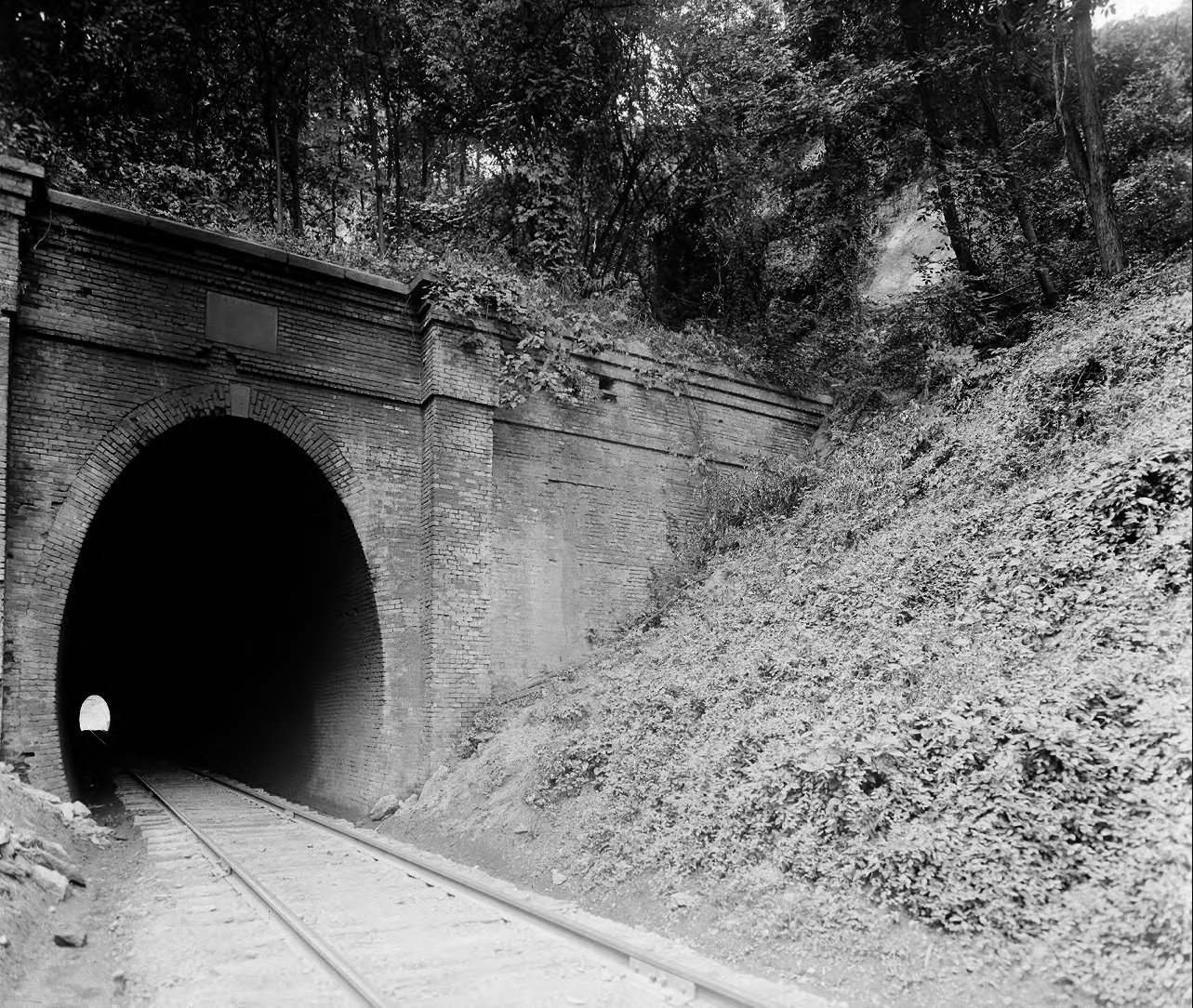
- Greenwood Tunnel in 1916
- Interactive map of Greenwood Tunnel

Overview
- Line: Blue Ridge Railroad (1853–1870); Chesapeake and Ohio Railway
- Location: Albemarle County
- Coordinates: 38°03′14″N 78°46′23″W
- Status: Abandoned and sealed

Operation
- Opened: 1853
- Closed: 1944
- Owner: Blue Ridge Railroad (1853–1870); Chesapeake and Ohio Railway

Technical
- Line length: 535.5 ft (163.2 m)
- Track gauge: 4 ft 8 1/2 in (1,435 mm)

The Greenwood Tunnel is a historic railroad tunnel constructed in 1853 by Claudius Crozet during the construction of the Blue Ridge Railroad. The tunnel was the easternmost tunnel in a series of four tunnels that were essential for crossing the Blue Ridge Mountains in Virginia. Located near Greenwood in Albemarle County, Virginia, the tunnel was used by the Chesapeake and Ohio Railway (C&O) until its abandonment in 1944.

Although no longer in use, the Greenwood Tunnel still exists, albeit sealed. It is located adjacent to the old C&O line, which is currently owned by CSX Transportation. The line is leased to the Buckingham Branch Railroad, which runs through a cut that bypasses the old tunnel.

== History ==
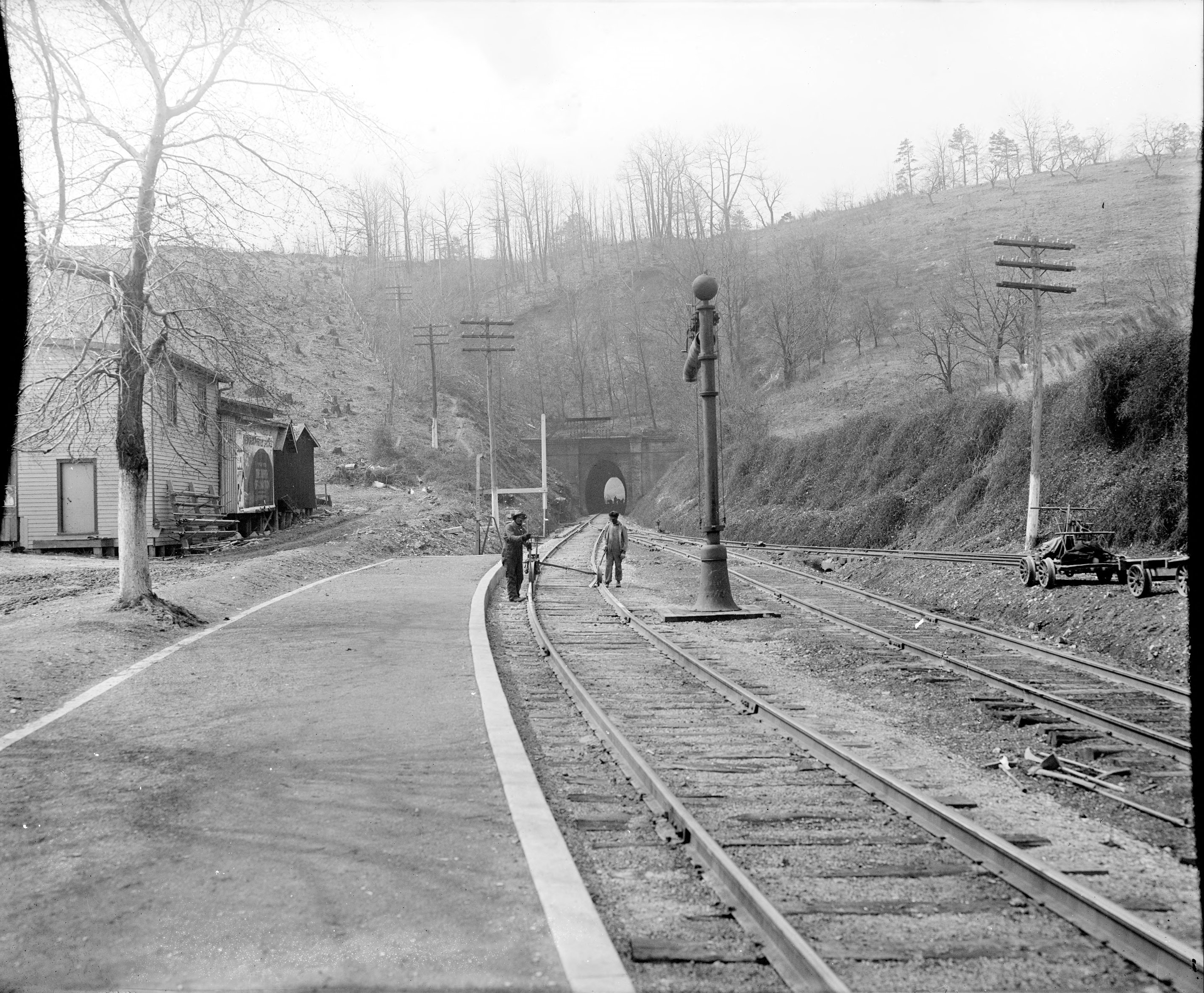
Greenwood Tunnel in 1917, as seen from the platform of the Greenwood Station

On March 5, 1849, the Virginia General Assembly passed an act to incorporate the Blue Ridge Railroad. This railroad was intended to construct a rail line over the Blue Ridge Mountains for the Louisa Railroad, which was renamed the Virginia Central Railroad in February 1850. The route was planned to extend from a point near Blair Park at the eastern base of the mountains to Waynesboro in the Shenandoah Valley via Rockfish Gap.

Claudius Crozet was appointed as the chief engineer of the Blue Ridge Railroad. Crozet developed a plan to cross the mountains using a series of four tunnels. The leadup to the tunnel was constructed by enslaved men, working under the auspices of Thomas Jefferson's grandson, Thomas Jefferson Randolph. The Greenwood Tunnel, the first tunnel on the eastern approach to the mountains, was driven through a small ridge near the village of Greenwood.

During the construction of the tunnel, the earth encountered was composed of clays and rotten slate, which created difficulties in maintaining a solid structure and was described by Crozet as "of most unfavorable character for tunneling." Because of this, it was found necessary to line the entire length of the tunnel with a strong arch made of bricks.

However, the brick arching procedure was hindered due to the poor quality of the bricks provided by Joseph Dettor, a local brickmaker. The bricks provided by Dettor were also planned to be used in the next tunnel west of the Greenwood Tunnel, Brookville Tunnel, but the conditions at Brookville were found to necessitate the use of a much stronger and more reliable brick, as the rock and earth was weaker. Because of their low quality, Crozet decided to not use Dettor's bricks in the Brookville Tunnel, but only in the Greenwood Tunnel, where the earth was slightly more stable. The best of the available bricks were chosen to be used in the tunnel, but problems with the quality of the brick still arose later on, when it was found that during freezing and thawing conditions, the arch was weakened by water. Nevertheless, the Greenwood Tunnel was completed and put into use by 1853, with a total cost of construction of $74,400. Although the construction of the Greenwood Tunnel was, as Crozet states, "excessively dangerous," the work was completed without accident.

The tunnel continued to be used by the Virginia Central's successor road, the Chesapeake and Ohio Railway, until it was bypassed by a cut about 600 feet (180 m) long and 130 feet (40 m) deep in 1944, part of a series of improvements to accommodate increased wartime traffic and the increasing size of rolling stock. Although the tunnel was abandoned, it was left in place beside the new cut and was sealed with concrete, in which state it remains to the present day.

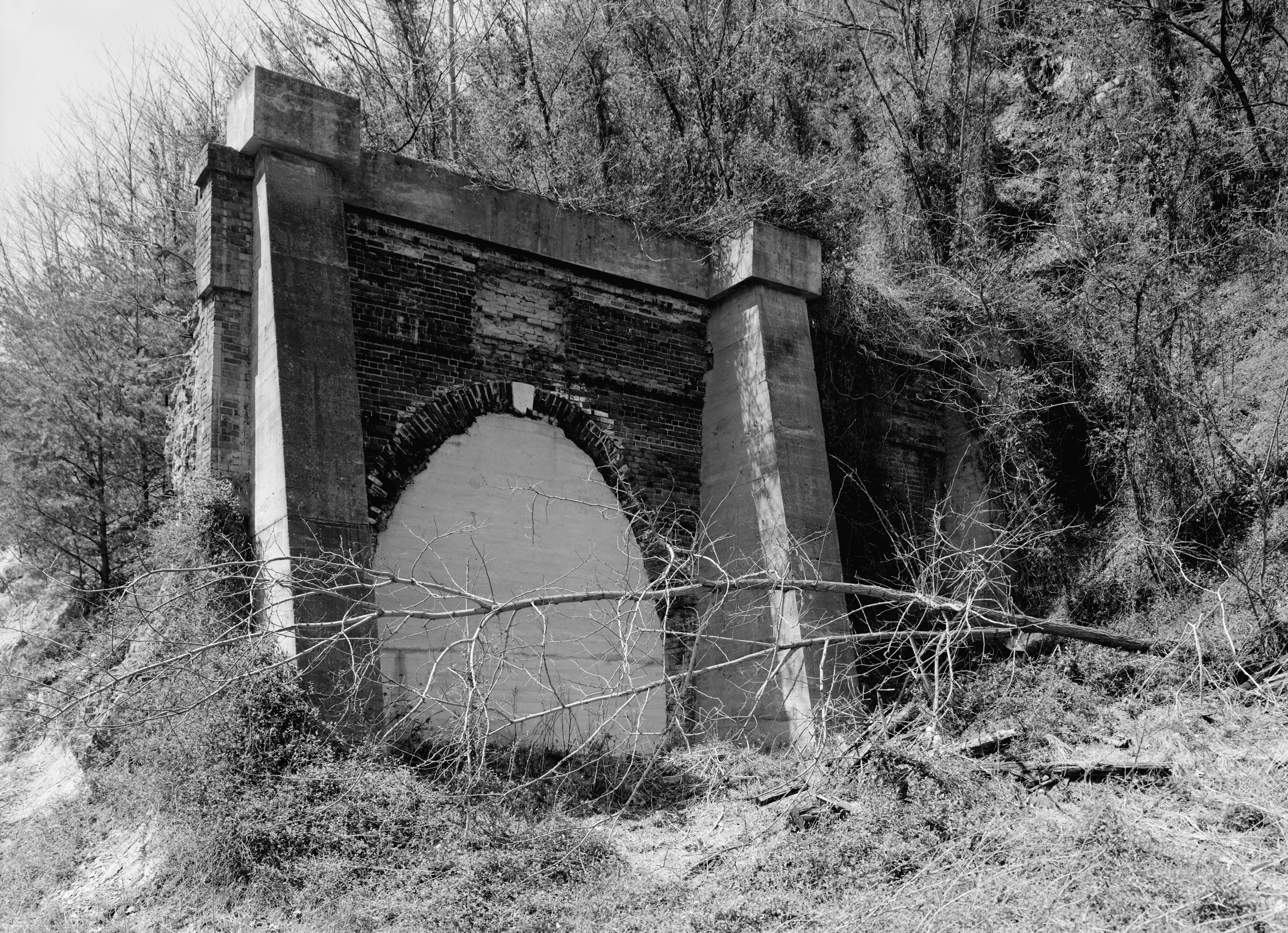
Greenwood Tunnel after abandonment; the concrete buttresses are not original.

== See also ==
- List of tunnels documented by the Historic American Engineering Record in Virginia
