= Blue Ridge Railroad (1849–1870) =

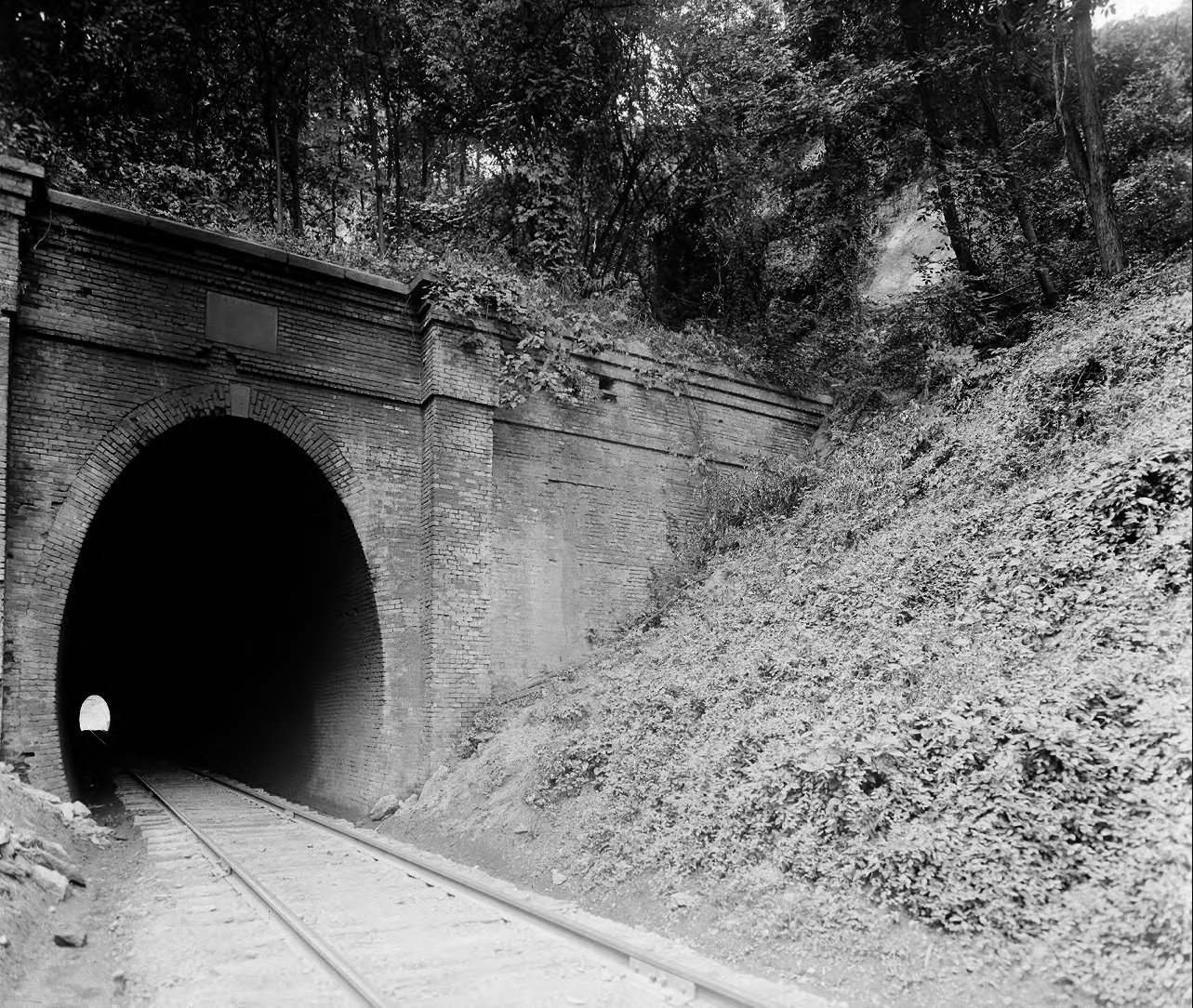
- Greenwood Tunnel constructed by the Blue Ridge Railroad

Overview
- Locale: Virginia – Albemarle County, Nelson County, Augusta County
- Dates of operation: 1849–1870
- Successor: Chesapeake and Ohio Railroad

Technical
- Track gauge: 4 ft 8 1/2 in (1,435 mm) standard gauge

The Blue Ridge Railroad was incorporated by the Commonwealth of Virginia in March 1849 to provide a state-financed crossing of the Blue Ridge Mountains for the Virginia Central Railroad, which it became a part of after completion.

== History ==
The early railroads in Virginia were privately owned, but often received partial state-funding through investments by the Virginia Board of Public Works, which was always keen to help with internal improvements in the state's transportation infrastructure. The Louisa Railroad Company (renamed Virginia Central in 1850) was chartered by the Commonwealth in 1836 and had reached a western point around Mechum's River by 1852. This railroad, which was planned to link the Piedmont region of Virginia with the Shenandoah Valley and points west, had found a planned crossing at Swift Run Gap to be financially unfeasible.

To protect its investment and enable transportation, the Virginia General Assembly then incorporated and financed the Blue Ridge Railroad to accomplish the hard and expensive task of crossing the Blue Ridge mountain barrier to the west. Rather than attempting the more formidable Swift Run Gap, the Blue Ridge Railroad built over the mountains at the next gap to the south, Rockfish Gap near Afton Mountain, from an eastern point around Blair Park to a western point near Waynesboro. Under the leadership of the great early civil engineer Claudius Crozet, the railroad bored four tunnels, from east to west: Greenwood Tunnel, Brooksville Tunnel, Little Rock Tunnel, and the 4,273-foot Blue Ridge Tunnel at the top of the pass, then one of the longest tunnels in the world. The tunnel was 'holed-through' on December 29, 1856, and was less than six inches off perfect alignment, as construction had proceeded from either end. Rail service didn't begin until April 1858, although temporary tracks over the top of the gap were placed in operation by the Virginia Central as early as 1854. This line enabled the Virginia Central to offer rail service over its entire length, which had reached a western point around Jackson's River Station, near present-day Clifton Forge, by 1857. Due to the extreme grade of the temporary tracks (approximately 5.6%), the first train to cross over the mountain wrecked on its return journey eastwards the following day. The completion of the Blue Ridge Tunnel eliminated this grade.

During the American Civil War, the tunnels on the Blue Ridge Railroad were utilized as part of the so-called foot cavalry movements of the Confederate troops of General Stonewall Jackson.

After the completion of the tunnels, the Blue Ridge Railroad was operated by the Virginia Central Railroad (which paid annual fees to the Commonwealth of Virginia for its use) until it was bought by and incorporated into the Virginia Central's successor road, the Chesapeake and Ohio Railroad, in 1870.

== Use of Slaves ==
At least three hundred enslaved African Americans were used to construct the Blue Ridge Railroad, either directly in the construction or indirectly making materials such as bricks. These slaves were generally hired from owners in the locality.

== Aftermath ==
After the Civil War, the Virginia Central and former Blue Ridge Railroads became part of Collis P. Huntington's Chesapeake and Ohio Railway and helped complete Virginia's longtime dream of linking its navigable rivers of the Chesapeake Bay watershed with the Ohio River, which led to the Mississippi River and the Gulf of Mexico.

The Blue Ridge Railroad and the former Virginia Central Railroad are both now part of CSX Transportation and are operated under lease by the Buckingham Branch Railroad.

Three of the original four tunnels were either replaced by newer ones or eliminated around World War II. Over 50 years later, still passable in the early 21st century, portions of the old tunnels and route were included in a rail trail project. The $1.6 million project is planned to turn the main Blue Ridge Tunnel into a "dark, chilly and 'mystical' hiking and biking trail".
