= Claudius Crozet =

French-American soldier and civil engineer (1789–1864)

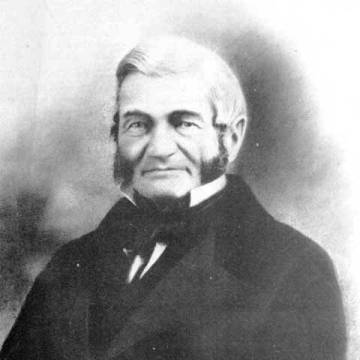
- Born: December 31, 1789; Villefranche, France
- Died: January 29, 1864 (aged 74); Virginia, Confederate States of America
- Occupations: Civil engineer, Educator
- Known for: Chief engineer of the Virginia Board of Public Works, including the Blue Ridge Railroad

Claude "Claudius" Crozet (December 31, 1789 – January 29, 1864) was a soldier, educator, and civil engineer.

Crozet was born in France and trained as an artillery officer and civil engineer. After the defeat of Napoleon's army, he emigrated to the United States in 1816 and joined the U.S. Army to teach at the U.S. Military Academy at West Point.

After resigning his commission in 1823, he took a job with the Virginia Board of Public Works and oversaw the planning and construction of canals, turnpikes, bridges and railroads in Virginia, including the area which became West Virginia during the American Civil War (during which Crozet sided with the Confederate States of America). Crozet also helped found the Virginia Military Institute in 1839 and earned a nickname as the "Pathfinder of the Blue Ridge."

== Early life, family ==
Claudius Crozet was born in Villefranche-sur-Saône, Auvergne-Rhône-Alpes, France on December 31, 1789 to Pierrette Varion Crozet and her husband, wine merchant François Crozet. His mother died when he was a boy, and his father moved to Paris in 1800 with Claude and two siblings. Claude secured permission to attend the École Polytechnique in 1805. He studied engineering (including bridge-building) as well as military matters, and graduated as sub-lieutenant on October 1, 1807. Crozet then graduated from the Imperial Artillery School in Metz, and received a commission as a second lieutenant on June 9, 1809. Thus, he served in the French Army under Napoleon Bonaparte, and won a promotion to captain on July 22, 1812 during Napoleon's invasion of Russia.

At the Battle of Borodino in September 1812, Captain Crozet was taken prisoner, but released in 1814 and returned to duty in the French army. Napoleon abdicated in April 1814, but returned to power about a year later, was defeated at the Battle of Waterloo on June 18, 1815 and surrendered about a month later. Crozet resigned from the French military on April 11, 1816.

On June 7, 1816, in Paris, Crozet married Agathe Decamp, and they would have daughters Agatha and Claudia Crozet Mills and a son (Alfred) before her death in March 1861.

== Immigration to United States and West Point ==
In the fall of 1816, Crozet and his bride immigrated to the United States. Almost immediately after arriving, Crozet began work as a professor of engineering at the U.S. Military Academy at West Point, New York.

While at West Point, Crozet is credited by some as being the first to use the chalkboard as an instructional tool. He also used the "Elementary Course of Civil Engineering", translated from the course of M. J. Sganzin at the École Polytechnique, designed several of the buildings on the campus, and published A Treatise on Descriptive Geometry. Thomas Jefferson referred to Claudius Crozet as "by far the best mathematician in the United States."

== Life in Virginia ==
=== Virginia Board of Public Works ===
In 1823, Crozet was elected Principal Engineer and Surveyor for the Virginia Board of Public Works. He resigned from his duties at West Point, and brought his wife and two children (a boy and a girl) with him to live in Richmond, Virginia.

Virginia's Board of Public Works was very active in promoting the development of canals, roads, and railroads. His work included approving various proposals and determining their engineering feasibility. At the time, Virginia extended all the way from the Atlantic Ocean to the Ohio River and was the largest state east of the Mississippi River. It included what is now the State of West Virginia. Crozet worked on hundreds of transportation projects, such as the Northwestern Turnpike.

Typical of his many projects of this nature was the Chesterfield Railroad, the first in Virginia, the plans of which he examined before Board of Public Works funds were approved. It began operations in 1831.

Crozet's 1848 map of Virginia

In 1832, Crozet left Virginia to work in Louisiana. However, he returned to his old job in Virginia in 1837 to work on roads, canals, railroads and other points of necessity for the state. By this time, some railroads were already under construction and the canal system had reached its potential. He left office in 1843 after losing support of canal owners when he correctly forecast the future advantages railroads would hold for Virginia. Authoring textbooks on highway, railroad and aqueduct design, his 1848 map of the entire state was the first since the one prepared by Peter Jefferson, father of Thomas Jefferson, over a century earlier.

=== Virginia Military Institute ===
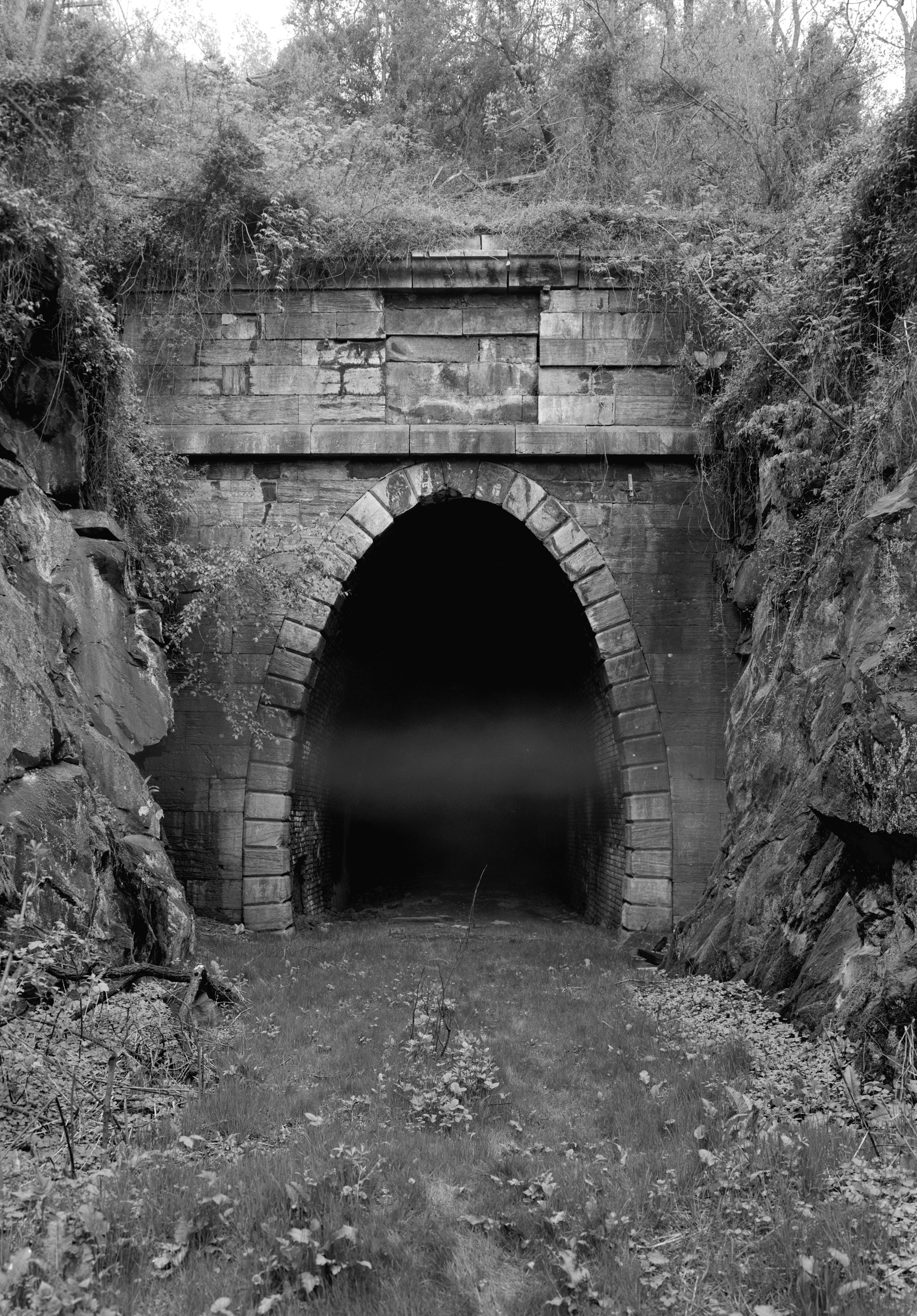
The North Entrance to the Blue Ridge tunnel

Crozet was one of the founders of Virginia Military Institute (VMI) at Lexington, Virginia, a major training institution for engineers and militia officers for Virginia and the South. When VMI opened in 1839, Crozet was the architect of the college's academic program and military organization. At its first meeting, the members of the VMI Board of Visitors elected Crozet president of the Board, a position he held for six years (while remaining the state's Chief Engineer).

However, his varied duties meant Crozet did not reside in Lexington, Virginia. In 1840, he and his family and five enslaved people lived in Richmond, Virginia. Ten years later, he and at least two much younger engineers boarded with plantation owner John T. Cocke in Albemarle County, Virginia.

=== Blue Ridge Tunnels ===
In 1839, Crozet surveyed the Blue Ridge Mountains and determined that the best way to allow the Blue Ridge Railroad, an extension of the Virginia Central Railroad, to cross the mountain would be through a series of four tunnels (from east to west: Greenwood Tunnel, Brookville Tunnel, Little Rock Tunnel, and Blue Ridge Tunnel) near Rockfish Gap at Afton Mountain. The 4,273 feet (1,302.4 m) long Blue Ridge Tunnel was opened in 1856, although rail service did not begin until April 1858. At that time, it was the longest tunnel in the United States and one of the longest in the world. Dug a decade before the invention of dynamite it was considered to be an "engineering wonder of the world" and was less than a half-foot (15.2 centimetres) off perfect alignment, as construction had proceeded from either end. Upon completion of the tunnels in 1858, the Blue Ridge Railroad ceased to exist, becoming a part of the Virginia Central Railroad.

During the American Civil War, Confederate General Thomas Stonewall Jackson, a former instructor at VMI, used Crozet's tunnel to transfer his "foot cavalry" (comparable to a rapid deployment force today) from the Shenandoah Valley to the east side of the Blue Ridge quickly, to the puzzlement and consternation of Union military leaders.

In 1868, the Virginia Central Railroad was merged with the Covington and Ohio Railroad to create the Chesapeake and Ohio Railway; the original tunnel served until it was replaced with a different alignment in 1944. Perhaps as mute testament to Crozet's extraordinary skills, despite advances in technology from the 1850s, the "new" mid 20th century tunnel was 4 feet (121.9 cm) off-center, in comparison with only 6 inches in Crozet's earlier project.

== Death and legacy ==
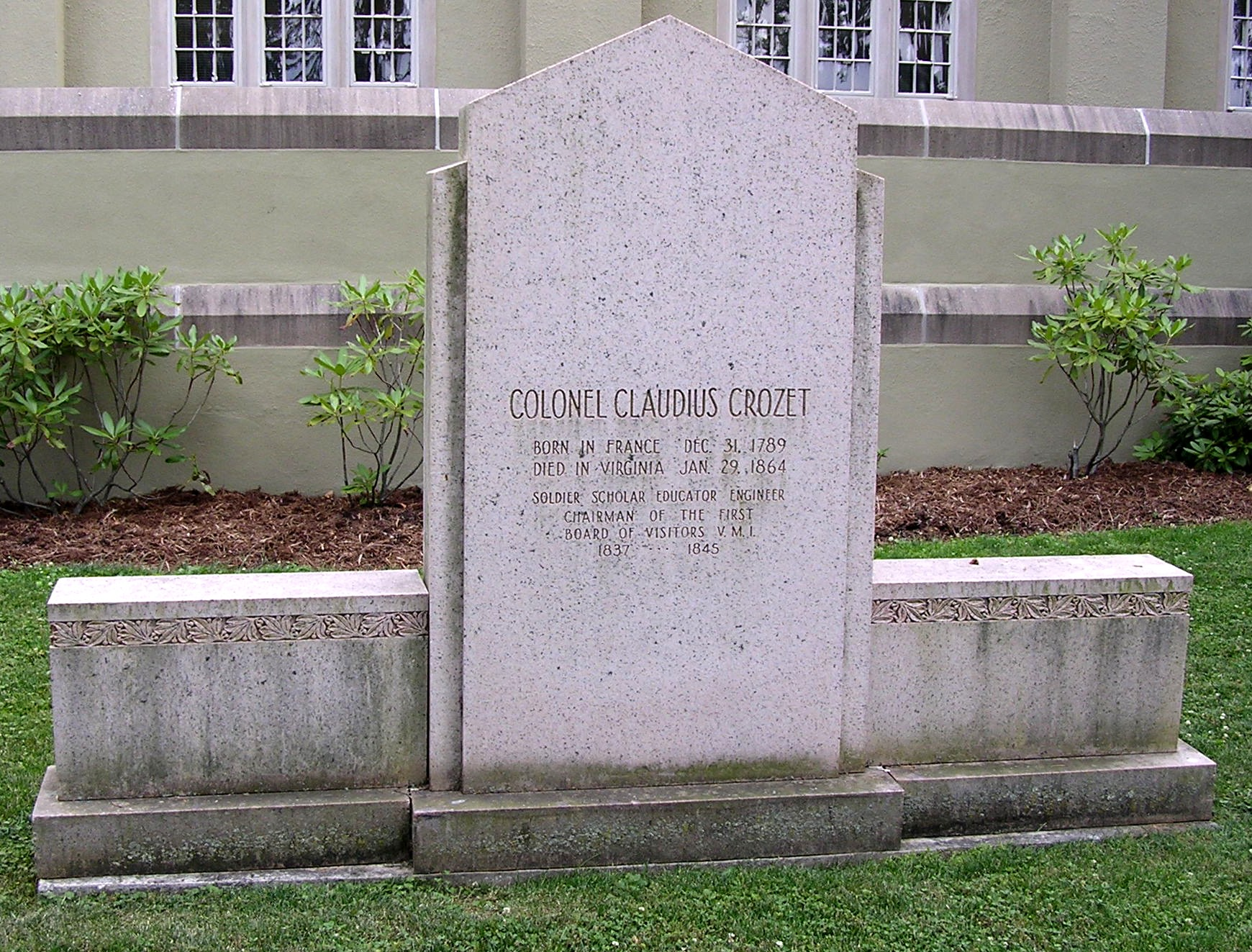
Crozet's grave on the campus of the Virginia Military Institute, in Lexington, Virginia

Crozet died in January 1864 at the residence of his daughter and son-in-law, as the Confederacy was losing the Civil War, but more than a year before its defeat. He was initially buried near his wife and children in Shockoe Hill Cemetery, but in 1942 his remains were reinterred in the Virginia Military Institute cemetery. Hundreds of plans and drawings which he oversaw have been retained in the archives of the Library of Virginia.

The town of Crozet, Virginia was named in his honor in 1870. The original Blue Ridge Tunnel was converted into a "rails-to-trails" project sponsored by Nelson County in 2020 and is the third-longest pedestrian tunnel in the United States.

VMI also named its dining hall in his honor, so cadets sometimes affectionately call it "Club Crozet".
