= Tunnel hole-through =

When the two sections of a tunnel under construction meet

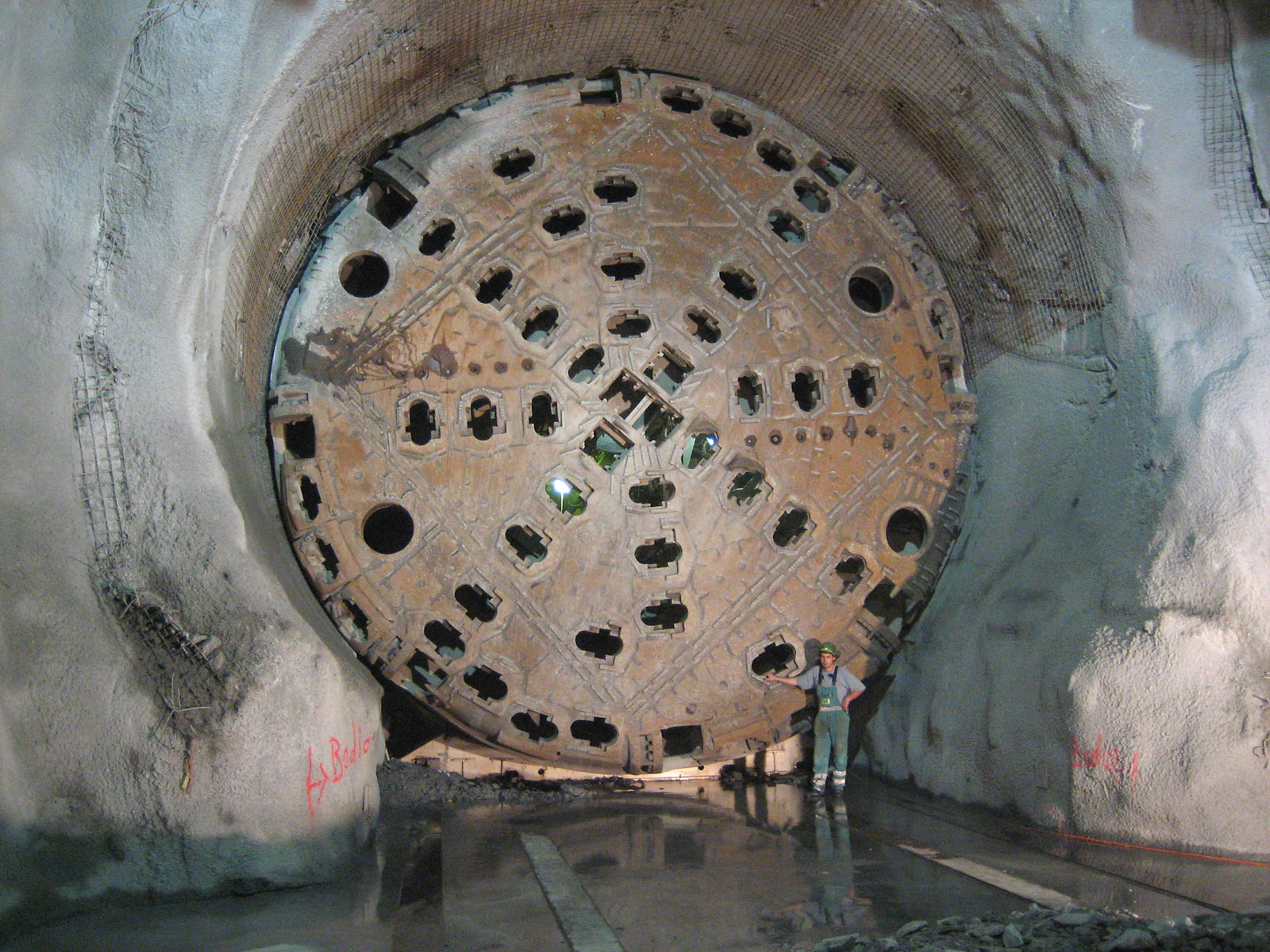
Dismantling the tunnel boring machine 10 days after the hole-through on the Gotthard Base Tunnel in Switzerland.

Tunnel hole-through, also called breakthrough, is the time, during the construction of a tunnel built from both ends, when the ends meet, and the accuracy of the survey work becomes evident. Many tunnels report breakthroughs with an error of only a few inches, for example:

- the 1858 Blue Ridge Tunnel – 6 inches (150 mm)
- the 1944 Blue Ridge Tunnel replacement – 4 feet (1.2 m) - 1944
- the Lötschberg Base Tunnel – 10 cm
- the Holland Tunnel - 1 cm

== See also ==
- Cascade Tunnel
- Siloam inscription
