= Rockfish Gap =

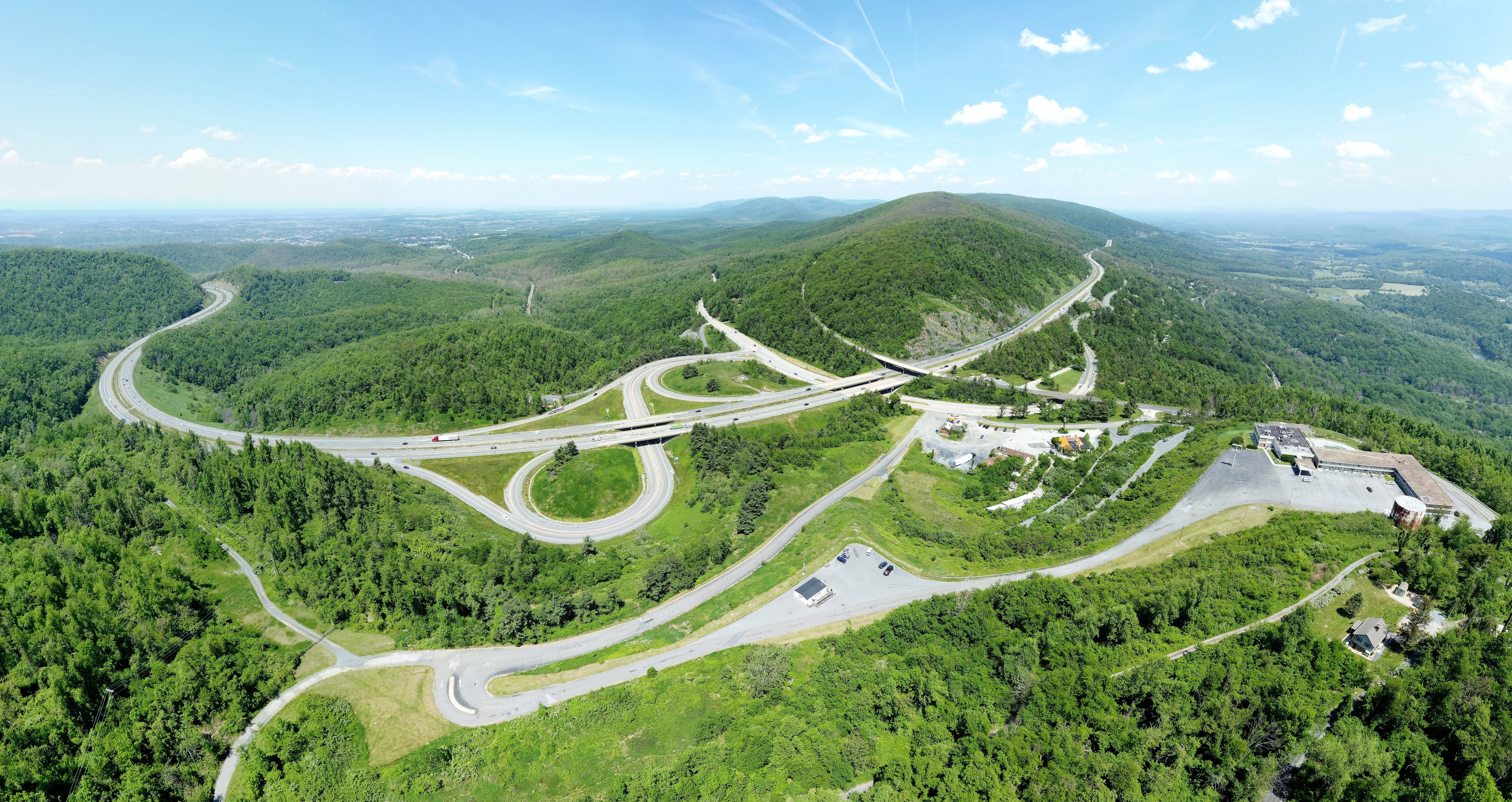
- Aerial view of Rockfish Gap showing the junction of I-64, US-250 and Blue Ridge Parkway

- Location within Virginia
- Elevation: 1,903 ft (580 m)
- Traversed by: I-64 / US 250

Location
- Location: Border of Augusta and Nelson counties, Virginia, United States
- Range: Blue Ridge Mountains
- Coordinates: 38°01′57″N 78°51′29″W
- Topo map: Waynesboro East

Rockfish Gap is a wind gap located in the Blue Ridge Mountains between Charlottesville and Waynesboro, Virginia, United States, through Afton Mountain, which is frequently used to refer to the gap.

Joining the Shenandoah Valley to the Piedmont region of the state, it is the site of the mountain crossing of Interstate 64, U.S. Route 250, and the former Blue Ridge Railroad which later became part of the Chesapeake and Ohio Railway and is currently part of the CSX line. With an elevation of about 1,900 feet (580 m), it is one of the lowest gaps between Manassas Gap and the James River. Rockfish Gap lies along a drainage divide between southeast-flowing streams that drain to the James River and northwest-flowing streams in the Shenandoah River system.

The scenic Skyline Drive, which runs through the Shenandoah National Park north to Front Royal, and south to the Blue Ridge Parkway, which continues on to a point near Cherokee, North Carolina, each generally following the mountain ridgetops; the two highways meet a short distance north of Rockfish Gap (such that the roadway on the bridge over the gap is actually part of the Blue Ridge Parkway). The Appalachian Trail also passes through the gap.

== Geology ==
Rockfish Gap is underlain by greenstones of the Catoctin Formation, a late Neoproterozoic geologic unit exposed throughout the Blue Ridge Mountains in Virginia, Maryland, and southern Pennsylvania Catoctin greenstones were originally erupted as basaltic lava flows 550 to 565 million years ago and later metamorphosed and deformed during the late Paleozoic Alleghenian orogeny (300 to 330 million years ago). Rockfish Gap lies astride a north-northwest trending fracture zone; some fractures are intruded by diabase dikes of Jurassic age. The broken bedrock along this fracture zone is more easily eroded than unfractured bedrock, which is likely the reason for the formation of the gap at this location.

== History ==
In the 18th century, early trails used by Native Americans were gradually expanded to accommodate the westward expansion of Virginia colonists. The Three Chopt or Three Notch'd Road had been established in the Colony of Virginia between Richmond and the Shenandoah Valley by the 1740s. Most likely, the road followed an ancient Monacan trail from the village of Orapax (east of Richmond) to the western Shenandoah Valley. This well-planned route required only one major river crossing, the Rivanna at Charlottesville, with inns or taverns spaced about 10 miles apart. By 1782, carriages could cross the Blue Ridge at Rockfish Gap.

In 1818, President James Monroe, former presidents Thomas Jefferson and James Madison, and Chief Justice of the United States Supreme Court John Marshall joined 24 other dignitaries at a meeting held in the Mountain Top Tavern at Rockfish Gap. Under Jefferson's leadership, they selected nearby Charlottesville as the site of the new University of Virginia.

In 1854, the German landscape artist Edward Beyer painted a landscape of Rockfish Gap and the Mountain House.

== Railroad, highway crossings ==
State Chief Engineer Claudius Crozet of the Virginia Board of Public Works oversaw construction of the railroad tunnel under Rockfish Gap in the 1850s as part of the state-owned Blue Ridge Railroad. This tunnel was later used by Confederate General Stonewall Jackson to move his foot cavalry during the 1862 Peninsula Campaign of the American Civil War. The original tunnel was replaced by the Chesapeake and Ohio Railway with a new one on a slightly different alignment in the mid-20th century. The railroad is now owned by CSX Transportation and is operated under lease to Buckingham Branch Railroad, a Virginia-based short-line railroad. The old tunnel (aka Blue Ridge Tunnel) is still intact and has been considered for possible re-use as a rail trail or bikeway. In November 2020 the old tunnel and a short trail running through it were opened to the public.

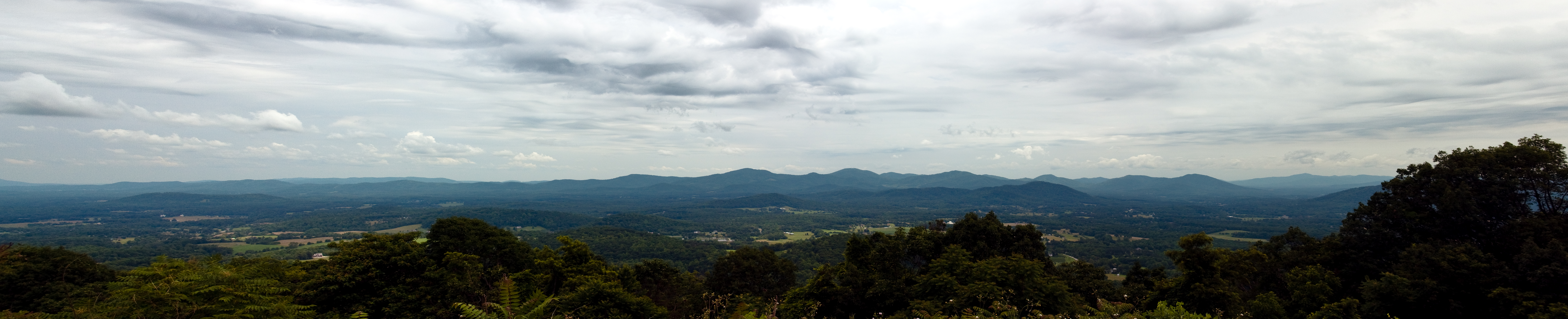
Rockfish Gap viewpoint

In the early 20th century, a road which was designated U.S. Route 250 in 1935 was built across the gap. In 1972 and 1973, sections of the new Interstate 64 were completed across Afton Mountain at Rockfish Gap.

== Fog, hazardous driving conditions ==
Rockfish Gap has been the site of several large multiple-vehicle collisions on Interstate 64 during foggy conditions on Afton Mountain, which peaks at about 1,915 feet above sea level. In April 1992, there were two fatalities in a 60-car pileup. In late April 1998, another wreck involving 65 cars sent 40 people to area hospitals. Less than three weeks later, there was another 18-car crash. Fog was a factor in all three incidents.

Motorists approaching from lower elevations sometimes suddenly encounter a dense fog as they approach the summit of the gap. A lighting system within the pavement to help designate lanes automatically activated by fog sensors was installed by the Virginia Department of Transportation (VDOT) to improve safety during such weather conditions.

== See also ==
- National Landmark of Soaring
