= Virginia Board of Public Works =

Agency overview
- Formed: February 5, 1816
- Dissolved: February 28, 1903
- Jurisdiction: Virginia
- Headquarters: Richmond, Virginia
- Parent department: Governor of Virginia

The Virginia Board of Public Works was a governmental agency which oversaw and helped finance the development of Virginia's transportation-related internal improvements during the 19th century. In that era, it was customary to invest public funds in private companies, which were the forerunners of the public service and utility companies of modern times. The state often invested in up to 40% of the stock to build turnpikes, toll bridges, canals, and water and rail transportation enterprises. A January 2, 1822, House Report from the Committee on Roads and Canals noted that

Virginia, in 1816, enacted a law, creating a board of public works, with power to appoint engineers and surveyors, and, also, creating a fund, to be applied exclusively to the rendering navigable, and uniting by canals, the principal rivers, and more intimately connecting, by means of public highways, the different parts of the commonwealth.

== Claudius Crozet: Virginia's State Engineer ==
Claudius Crozet (1789–1864), a civil engineer and educator who helped found the Virginia Military Institute (VMI), was Principal Engineer and later Chief Engineer of the Board of Public Works. He was involved with the planning and construction of many of the canals, turnpikes, bridges, and railroads in Virginia, including the area which is now West Virginia. Of the many people who helped build Virginia's transportation infrastructure, Crozet is one of the better-known individuals. His work in the Antebellum period was exceptionally well-documented.

== Massive state debt ==
In 1861, with the onset of the American Civil War, Virginia's investments in "Public Works" was interrupted. The State had purchased a total of $48,000,000 worth of stock in turnpike, toll bridge, canal, and water and rail transportation enterprises.

After the War, many of the improvements had been destroyed but the debt remained to be paid. This state debt became a major issue during Reconstruction, including questions about an apportionment to the newly created State of West Virginia. Politicians Harrison H. Riddleberger of Woodstock, an attorney, and former Confederate Major General William Mahone, a railroad builder, organized the Readjuster Party largely based upon this issue. Their coalition of newly enfranchised blacks, Republicans, and Conservative Democrats was a factor in state politics, electing William E. Cameron as governor, and sending both Riddleberger and later Mahone to the U.S. Congress. Mahone held a powerful swing vote in the U.S. Senate during the short administration of President James A. Garfield, who was assassinated. By the 1890s, the Readjusters were no longer a major force, and Conservative Democrats ruled Virginia until the late 1960s.

Virginia's infrastructure debt issue with West Virginia was finally resolved in 1915, when the United States Supreme Court ruled that West Virginia owed Virginia $12,393,929.50. The final installment of this sum was paid off in 1939.

== Shift from financing to regulatory role, creation of SCC ==
After the American Civil War, the Board's role shifted from financing to a regulatory role, as the rebuilding and expansion of the railroads were financed largely by Northern interests. The canals and turnpikes under the Board's authority declined as shipping shifted to the newer technology. The Board of Public Works was replaced by the Virginia General Assembly with a new agency, the Virginia State Corporation Commission in 1903.

== Historical archives ==
Hundreds of plans and drawings of the Board of Public Works have been retained in the archives of the Library of Virginia. Many are available for viewing on-line through the Internet.

The Library of Virginia's official website notes: "Few collections in other archival institutions are comparable. Over the years, researchers have used the records for many purposes. Maps, plans, and correspondence relating to canals have aided in the restoration of canal locks and other surviving canal features. Records relating to turnpikes and railroads assisted in resolving right-of-way questions. Field survey notes help identify changes in topography and aid in the location of archaeological sites. Surprising as it may seem, sketches made in the 1830s and 1850s of county boundaries are still consulted today."
