= Barbara (given name) =

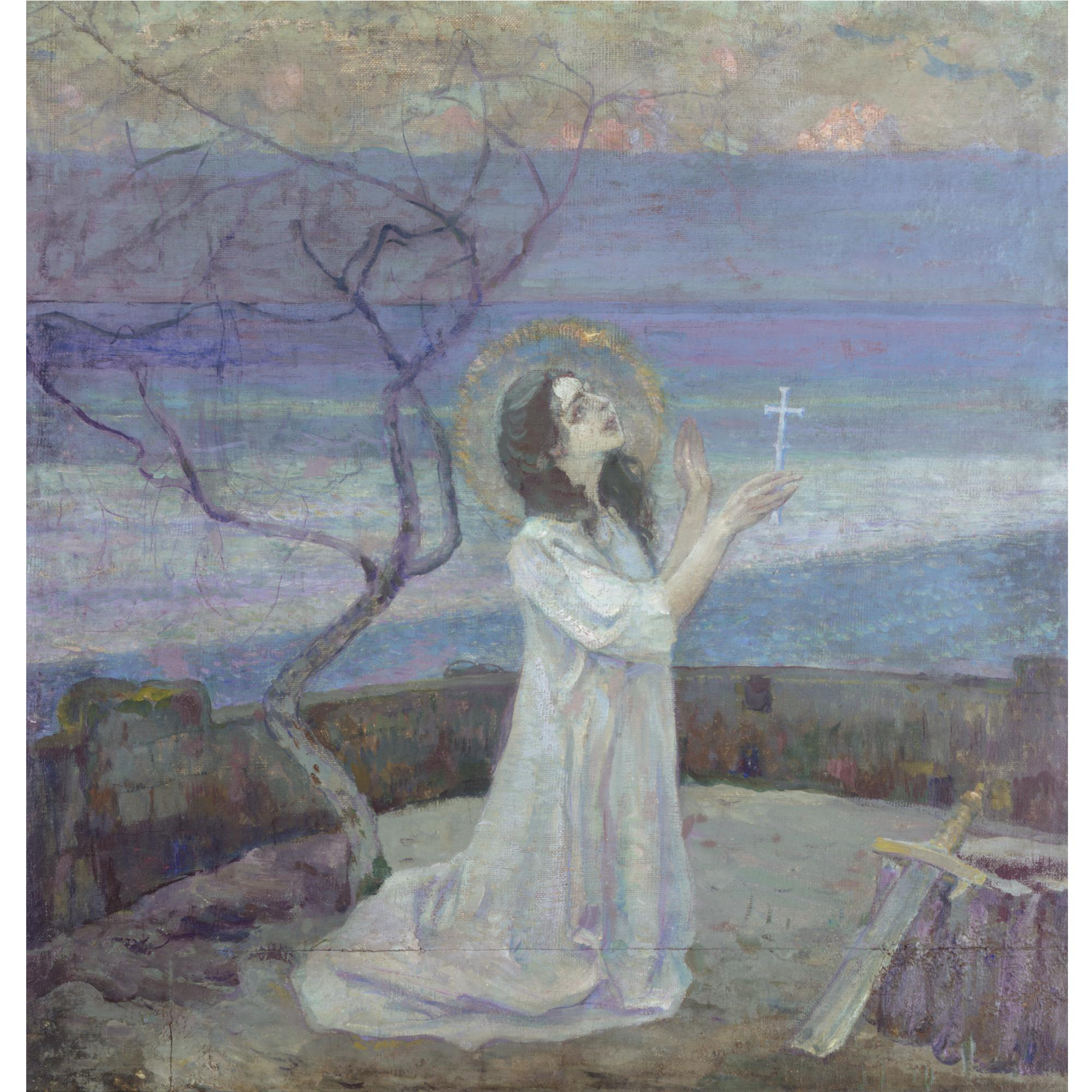
- Usage of the name increased in part due to the popularity of the Christian Saint Barbara, depicted in this 1924 painting by Mikhail Vasilievich Nesterov.
- Pronunciation: /ˈbɑːrbərə/ BAR-bər-ə; /ˈbɑːrbrə/ BAR-brə
- Gender: feminine
- Language: Greek
- Name day: December 4

Origin
- Meaning: "strange or foreign"

Other names
- See also: Babs, Barbie, Barb, Barbro, Bärbel, Varvara

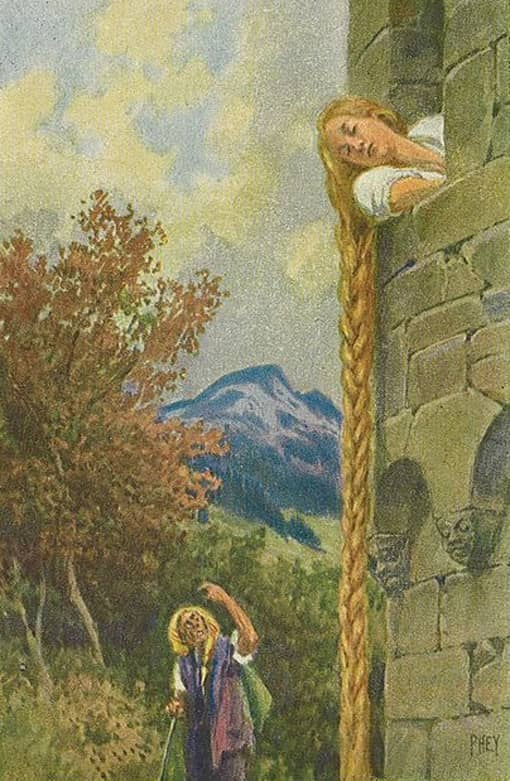
Rapunzel and the Prince, an illustration by Paul Hey

Barbara and Barbra are given names. They are the feminine form of the Greek word barbaros (Koine Greek: βάρβαρος) meaning "stranger" or "foreign". In Roman Catholic and Eastern Orthodox tradition, Saint Barbara (Koine Greek: Ἁγία Βαρβάρα) was imprisoned in a tower by her father. She was then martyred by her father when she refused to renounce Christianity. According to legend, her father was then punished with death by lightning. As such, Saint Barbara is a protectress against fire and lightning. Early Christians occasionally referred to themselves as "barbarians" in opposition to the pagan Romans and Greeks. The story of Saint Barbara is said to have been an inspiration for the fairy tale Rapunzel and other European stories that feature a maiden in a tower.

Today, the name Barbara or its variants are commonly given to female babies born in such countries as Chile, the Czech Republic, Estonia, Georgia, Hungary, Poland, Slovakia, and Russia, among others. Barbie, a traditional English hypocorism for the name and the brand name of a popular fashion doll, is well-used as an independent name for girls and women in the American Amish community. There was also increased interest in the name Barbie following the release of the 2023 film Barbie. Barbara was among the most popular names for girls in English-speaking countries in the first half of the 20th century but has since decreased in usage in countries such as the United States. There were 271 American girls named Barbara and 27 American girls named Barbie in 2022. The name increased in usage in 2023 in the United States, with 305 newborn girls given the name that year, an increase of 87 from 2022. The name ranked 877th on the popularity chart in 2023. Another 32 American girls were named Barbie in 2023.

In Italy, Barbara was particularly popular during the 1970s: it was among the top 10 names given to girls born from 1969 to 1977, rising to 2nd place (behind Maria) in 1971. In the same year, it was the most common name for girls born in Rome and in Bologna.

== Variants ==
- Babag (Scottish Gaelic)
- Babaidh (Scottish Gaelic)
- Babara (Hawaiian)
- Babbie (English)
- Babs (English)
- Baiba (Latvian)
- Baibín (Irish Gaelic)
- Bairbre (Irish Gaelic)
- Bára (Czech)
- Barabal (Scottish Gaelic)
- Barb (name) (English)
- Barba (Faroese)
- Bàrbara (Catalan)
- Bárbara (Galician, Portuguese, Spanish)
- Barbara (Belarusian, Croatian, English, French, German, Hungarian, Italian, Maltese, Polish, Romanian, Slovene, Serbian)
- Barbare (Georgian)
- Barbary (English)
- Bärbel (German)
- Barbera (Italian, old Florentine variant)
- Barbie (English)
- Barbo (Norwegian)
- Barbora (Czech, Lithuanian, Slovak)
- Barborka (Slovak), (Czech)
- Barbra (English)
- Barbro (Norwegian, Swedish)
- Barbuš, Baruš (Czech)
- Barby (English)
- Barča (Czech)
- Barunka (Czech)
- Baruška (Czech)
- Basia (Polish)
- Baśka (Polish)
- Basieńka (Polish)
- Berber (West Frisian)
- Borbála, Barbara (Hungarian)
- Varvara (Bulgarian, Greek, Russian)
- Βαρβάρα (Varvara), (Greek)
- Варвара (Varvara), (Russian, Ukrainian)
- Варя (Varya), (Russian, Ukrainian)

== People with the given name Barbara or Bárbara ==
=== Academia ===
- Barbara Abbott (born 1943), American linguist
- Barbara Adams (Egyptologist) (1945–2002), British historian and Egyptologist
- Barbara Angus (1924–2005), New Zealand diplomat and historian
- Barbara Evelyn Bailey (born 1942), Jamaican educator and gender studies advocate
- Barbara Bailey (Connecticut Four), American librarian and activist
- Barbara Bates (American physician) (1928–2002), American physician, author and historian
- Barbara A. Bowman (born 1954), American nutritionist
- Barbara H. Bowman (1930–1996), American geneticist
- Barbara Dawson (born 1957), Irish art historian, museum gallery director, author, curator
- Barbara Drossel (born 1963), German physicist
- Barbara Else (born 1947), New Zealand writer
- Barbara Ercolano (born 1977), Italian astrophysicist
- Barbara Galland, New Zealand academic in the field of paediatric sleep health
- Barbara R. Hatton, American academic administrator
- Barbara Hochstein, German–New Zealand radiologist
- Barbara Krauthamer (born 1967), American historian
- Barbara Levick (1931–2023), British historian
- Barbara Liskov (born 1939), American computer scientist, recipient of the Turing Award
- Barbara Buhler Lynes (born 1942), American art historian
- Barbara McClintock (1902–1992), American scientist
- Barbara Mitcalfe (1928–2017), New Zealand conservationist, botanist and educator
- Barbara Rokowska (1926–2012), Polish mathematician
- Barbara Stollberg-Rilinger (born 1955), German historian
- Barbara Strang (1925–1982), English language scholar
- Barbara Tudek (1952–2019), biologist, professor who served as president of the Polish section of the European Environmental Mutagenesis and Genomics Society
- Barbara Voss (born 1967), American historical archaeologist
- Barbara Ward (1914–1981), Lady Jackson, British economist and writer
- Barbara Yeaman (1924–2025), American conservationist
- Barbara Yorke (born 1951), British historian

=== Arts ===
- Barbara (1930–1997; stage name of Monique Andrée Serf), French singer
- Barbara Acklin (1943–1998), American soul singer
- Barbara Avedon (1925–1994), American television writer
- Dame Barbara Cartland (1901–2000), English novelist
- Barbara Chase-Riboud (born 1939), American visual artist and sculptor (born 1939)
- Barbara Comyns (1907–1992), English writer and artist
- Barbara Corcoran (born 1949), American entrepreneur
- Barbara Dex (born 1974), Belgian singer
- Barbara Dickson (born 1947), British singer
- Barbara Fei (1931–2017), Hong Kong soprano opera singer
- Barbara Frischmuth (1941–2025), Austrian writer and poet
- Barbara Frittoli (born 1967), Italian opera singer
- Barbara Gibbs Golffing (1912–1993), American poet and translator
- Barbara Gordon (filmmaker) (born 1935), American documentary filmmaker and author
- Barbara Harnack (born 1957), American ceramic and mixed media sculpture artist
- Barbara Haščáková (1979–2023), Slovak singer
- Barbara Hendricks (born 1948), African-American operatic soprano
- Dame Barbara Hepworth (1903–1975), British artist and sculptor
- Barbara Elisabeth van Houten (1863–1950), Dutch painter
- Barbara Jakobson (1933–2025), American art collector
- Barbara Nation, known as Barbara Jones, Jamaican singer
- Barbara Jordan (poet) (born 1949), American poet
- Barbara Karinska (1886–1983), Ukrainian costumer of the New York City Ballet
- Barbara Karlich (born 1969), Austrian television presenter
- Barbara Keiler, pen name Judith Arnold (born 1953), American writer
- Barbara Kingsolver (born 1955), American novelist and essayist
- Barbara Kolb (1939–2024), American composer
- Barbara Kopple (born 1946), American film director
- Barbara Longhi (1552–1638), Italian painter
- Barbara Mandrell (born 1948), American singer and musician
- Barbara Matera (costume designer) (1929–2001), British-born American costume and clothing designer
- Barbara McCauley (born 1951), American romance writer
- Barbara Moore (disambiguation), various individuals with the same or similar names
- Barbara O'Neal, American novelist
- Barbara Pennington (1954–2023), American music artist
- Barbara Pravi (born 1993), French singer
- Barbara Randolph (1942–2002), American soul singer
- Barbara Rosiak (born 1955), Polish graphic artist and painter
- Barbara Rybałtowska (1936–2025), Polish singer, songwriter
- Barbara Schöneberger (born 1974), German entertainer
- Barbara Seidenath (born 1960), American metalsmith and jeweler
- Barbara Strozzi (1619–1677), Italian Baroque singer and composer
- Barbara Jožefa Struss (1805–1880), Slovenian drawing teacher and painter
- Barbara Traub, American photographer
- Barbara "Basia" Trzetrzelewska (born 1954), Polish singer-songwriter and recording artist
- Barbara Vernon (writer) (1916–1978), Australian playwright and screenwriter
- Barbara Yelin (born 1977), German cartoonist

==== Actors ====
- Barbara Auer (born 1959), German actress
- Barbara Bach (born 1947), American actress
- Barbara Bain (born 1931), American actress
- Barbara Barrie (born 1931), American actress
- Barbara Bates (1925–1969), American actress
- Barbara Carrera (born 1945), Nicaraguan-American actress
- Barbara Colby (1939–1975), American actress
- Barbara Dunkelman (born 1989), Canadian-born actress and internet personality
- Barbara Eden (born 1931), American actress
- Barbara Feldon (born 1933), American actress
- Barbara Flaminia (1540–1586), Italian stage actress
- Barbara Hale (1922–2017), American actress
- Barbara Hershey (born 1948), American actress
- Barbara Jefford (1930–2020), British actress
- Barbara Kellerman (born 1949), British actress
- Barbara Kent (1907–2011), American actress
- Barbara Knox (born 1933), English actress
- Barbara La Marr (1896–1926), American actress
- Barbara Lea (1929–2011), American actress and singer
- Barbara McNair (1934–2007), American singer and actress
- Barbara Nedeljáková (born 1979), Slovak actress
- Barbara Nichols (1928–1976), American actress and sex symbol
- Barbara O'Neil (1910–1980), American actress
- Barbara Rafferty (born 1950), Scottish actress
- Barbara Rudnik (1958–2009), German actress
- Barbara Stanwyck (1907–1990), American actress
- Barbara Sukowa (born 1950), German actress
- Barbara Windsor (1937–2020), English comedy and soap opera actress
- Barbara Alyn Woods (born 1962), American actress
- Barbara Yung (1959–1985), Hong Kong actress

=== Law ===
- Barbara Findlay, Canadian lawyer
- Barbara Jackman (born 1950), Canadian lawyer
- Barbara S. Jones (born 1947), United States district judge of the United States District Court for the Southern District of New York
- Barbara Ann Rowan (1938–2020), American attorney
- Barbara Seal, Canadian judge from Montreal, Quebec

=== Nobility ===
- Barbara of Austria (1539–1572), Archduchess of Austria
- Barbara of Brandenburg (1464–1515), Queen consort of Bohemia and Hungary
- Barbara of Cilli (1392–1451), Queen of Hungary, Germany and Bohemia, Empress of Holy Roman Empire
- Barbara Hamilton, 14th Baroness Dudley (1907–2002), British noblewoman
- Barbara of Hesse (1536–1597), Duchess of Württemberg-Mömpelgard
- Barbara of Portugal (1711–1758), Queen Consort of Spain
- Barbara Bronisława Czarnowska (1810–1891), Polish noblewoman, independence fighter and soldier
- Barbara Freyberg, Baroness Freyberg (1887–1973), British peeress
- Barbara Palmer, 1st Duchess of Cleveland (1640–1709)
- Barbara Radziwiłł (1520–1551), Queen of Poland
- Barbara Ward, Baroness Jackson of Lodsworth (1914–1981), British economist and writer

=== Politics, Diplomacy & Activism ===
- Barbara Adams (attorney) (born 1951), Pennsylvania attorney and politician
- Barbara Adams (politician) (born 1962), Canadian politician
- Barbara Agostino (born 1982), Luxembourgish politician
- Barbara Allimadi (1972–2020), Ugandan politician and human rights activist
- Barbara Ayrton-Gould (1886–1950), British politician and suffragist
- Barbara Bailey (politician) (born 1944), American politician
- Barbara Ball (1924–2011), Bermudian politician
- Barbara Ballard (born 1944), American politician
- Barbara Bartuś (born 1967), Polish politician
- Barbara Biggie, American politician
- Barbara Bohannan-Sheppard (born 1950), American politician
- Barbara Boxer (born 1940), American politician (US House Representative & US Senator, D-CA)
- Barbara Bush (1925–2018), First Lady of the United States 1989–1993
- Barbara Cartwright, Bahamian politician
- Barbara Castle, Baroness Castle of Blackburn (1910–2002), British politician
- Barbara Creecy (born 1958), South African politician
- Barbara Comstock (born 1959), American attorney, lobbyist, and politician
- Barbara Dittrich (born 1964), American politician
- Barbara Dürk, (1949–2014), German trade union functionary, publicist and management consultant
- Barbara Ehrenreich (1941–2022), American author and political activist
- Barbara Waxman Fiduccia (1955–2001), American disability activist, author, and educator
- Barbara Floridia (born 1977), Italian politician
- Barbara French (1926–2022), American politician
- Barbara Gibson (born 1962), American-born British politician and academic
- Barbara Griffin, American politician
- Barbara Gysi (born 1964), Swiss politician
- Barbara Hanley (1882–1959), Canadian politician
- Barbara Hatfield (born 1935), American politician
- Barbara Hendricks (politician) (born 1952), German politician, Minister of Finance
- Barbara Höll, (born 1957), German politician
- Barbara Holm (born 1948), American politician
- Barbara Janke (born 1947), British politician
- Barbara Jordan (1936–1996), American politician
- Barbara Kalik (born 1936), American politician
- Barbara Keeley (born 1952), British politician
- Barbara B. Kennelly (born 1936), American politician
- Barbara Lee (born 1946), American politician
- Barbara Lezzi (born 1972), Italian politician
- Barbara Lisk (born 1952), American politician
- Barbara Lüdemann (1922–1992), German politician
- Barbara Masini (born 1974), Italian politician
- Barbara Matera (politician) (born 1981), Italian politician
- Barbara Mikulski (born 1936), American politician
- Barbara O'Shea (born 1963), Australian politician
- Barbara Patton (born 1944), New York politician and university professor
- Barbara Piwnik (born 1955), Polish judge and politician
- Barbara Pompili (born 1975), French politician
- Barbara "Dusty" Roads (1928–2023), American labor activist and flight attendant
- Barbara Reimers (1919–2010), American politician
- Barbara Roche (born 1954), British politician
- Barbara Romagnan (born 1974), French politician and teacher
- Barbara Salt (1904–1975), British diplomat
- Barbara Schack (1873/4–1958), Sudeten German politician
- Barbara Schmid-Federer (born 1965), Swiss politician
- Barbara ter Kuile (1929–2004), American politician
- Barbara Thaler (born 1982), Austrian politician
- Barbara Vernon (activist), Australian maternity activist and government lobbyist
- Barbara Wasinger (born 1958), American politician
- Barbara Webster-Bourne, Anguillian Speaker of the National Assembly
- Barbara Woodward (born 1961), British diplomat
- Barbara Wylie (1861–1954), British suffragette
- Barbara Steel (1857–1942), Scottish-South African suffragette

=== Religion ===
- Saint Barbara, early Christian martyr
- Barbara Choe Yong-i, Korean Roman Catholic laywoman, martyr and saint
- Bárbara de Santo Domingo (1842–1872), Spanish Catholic mystic
- Barbara Bailey (artist) (1910–2003), British nun (Sister Mary Barbara Bailey), artist, and illustrator

=== Sports ===
- Barbara Abart (born 1985), Italian luger
- Barbara Aigner (born 2005), Austrian para-alpine skier
- Barbara Banks (1947–2025), English long-distance runner
- Barbara Calder (1924–2018), British yachtswoman
- Bárbara Micheline do Monte Barbosa (born 1988), known as Bárbara, Brazilian footballer
- Barbara Brych (born 2000), Polish fencer
- Barbara Howard (athlete) (1920–2017), Canadian sprinter
- Barbara Jelić-Ružić (born 1977), Croatian volleyball player
- Barbara Jones (sprinter) (born 1937), American sprinter
- Barbara Jordan (tennis) (born 1957), American tennis player
- Barbara Joscelyne (born 1959), British Paralympian athlete
- Barbara Kendall (born 1967), boardsailor from New Zealand
- Barbara Kennedy (1960–2018), American basketball player
- Barbara Klerk (born 1989), Belgian figure skater
- Barbara Lah (born 1972), Italian triple jumper
- Barbara de Loor (born 1974), Dutch speed skater
- Barbara Mensing (born 1960), German archer
- Barbara Niedernhuber (born 1974), German luger
- Barbara Oddone (born 1970), Italian tennis player
- Barbara Pardo (born 1999), Spanish canoeist
- Barbara Paulus (born 1970), Austrian tennis player
- Barbara Potter (born 1961), Barbara Jordan's American compatriot and tennis player
- Barbara Rittner (born 1973), German tennis player
- Barbara Riveros Diaz (born 1987), Chilean triathlete
- Barbara Sadleder (born 1967), Austrian alpine skier
- Barbara Schett (born 1976), Austrian tennis player
- Barbara Skinner (1911–1942), British racing driver
- Barbara Viera (1941–2026), American volleyball coach
- Barbara Wagner (born 1938), Canadian figure skater

=== Others ===
- Barbara Adachi, American businesswoman
- Barbara Berlusconi (born 1984), Italian business executive
- Barbara Bestor (born 1969), American architect based in Los Angeles
- Bárbara Cabrera (born 1996), Argentine fashion model and beauty pageant titleholder who was appointed Miss Universe Argentina 2022
- Barbara Dreaver, New Zealand broadcast journalist
- Barbara Figueroa, American chef
- Barbara Frost (born 1952), British charity executive
- Barbara Frum (1937–1992), Canadian broadcast journalist
- Barbara Fry (1922–1997), British daffodil breeder and horticulturist
- Barbara Fugger (1419–1497), German banker
- Barbara Fuld, better known as Bracha Fuld (1926–1946), German-born Jewish resistance fighter
- Barbara Galpin (1855–1922), American journalist
- Barbara Harris (disambiguation), various individuals with same or similar names
- Barbara Hutton (1912–1979), American heiress
- Barbara Kavovit, American socialite
- Barbara Kay (born 1943), Canadian columnist
- Barbara Ledermann (born 1925), German-born American Holocaust survivor
- Barbara Joan March (born 1945), American criminal
- Barbara McAlister (disambiguation), various individuals with the same or similar names
- Barbara Moriarty (1902–1979), Australian Red Cross field representative
- Bárbara Palacios (born 1963), Venezuelan beauty queen
- Barbara Palvin (born 1993), Hungarian model
- Barbara Peterson (born 1953), American philanthropist and former beauty pageant titleholder
- Barbara Schwartz (disambiguation), several people
- Barbara Sturgeon, British broadcaster
- Barbara Thenn (1519–1579), Austrian merchant and Münzmeister
- Barbara Walters (1929–2022), American journalist
- Barbara Young (disambiguation), various individuals with the same or similar names
- Barbara Zdunk (1769–1811), Polish alleged arsonist

== People with the given name Barbra ==
- Barbra Amesbury (born 1948), formerly Bill Amesbury, Canadian singer-songwriter, composer and filmmaker
- Barbra Banda (born 2000), Zambian Olympic footballer
- Barbra Fontana (born 1965), American beach volleyball player
- Barbra Fuller (1921–2024), American actress and centenarian
- Barbra Higgins (born 1957), Panamanian Olympic fencer
- Barbra Lica, Canadian jazz singer and songwriter
- Barbra Riley (born 1949), American photographer
- Barbra Ring (1870–1955), Norwegian writer and critic
- Barbra Casbar Siperstein (1942–2019), American political and transgender-rights activist
- Barbra Streisand (born 1942), American singer and film and theatre actress
- Barbra Walz (1950/51–1990), American fashion photographer

== Fictional characters with the given name Barbara ==
- Barbara "Barbie" Roberts, the name of famous Mattel doll
- Barbara, a character from the videogame Genshin Impact

== See also ==
- Babs (disambiguation)
- Barbie (disambiguation)
- Barb (name)
- Barbro
- Bärbel
- Varvara (disambiguation)
