= Barbel =

Barbel may refer to:

- Barbel (zoology), a whisker-like organ near the mouth found in some fish (notably catfish, loaches and cyprinids) and turtles
- Barbel (fish), a common name for certain species of fish
  - Barbus barbus, a species of cyprinid native to Eurasia
  - Clarias gariepinus and related species of African catfish
- USS Barbel (SS-316), a US Navy submarine launched in 1943
- USS Barbel (SS-580), a US Navy submarine launched in 1958
  - Barbel class of submarines of which SS-580 was the lead ship

== People ==
Given name

- Bärbel, a German-language feminine given name

Surname

- Jacques Barbel (c. 1670–1740), French soldier
- Marie-Anne Barbel (1704–1793), French-Canadian businesswoman

== See also ==
- Barbell, weight training equipment
