= François Lévesque =

François Lévesque (June 29, 1732 – January 15, 1787) was a French-born merchant and political figure in Quebec. He served as a member of the Legislative and Executive Councils.

He was probably born in Rouen, of Huguenot descent, the son of François Lévesque and Marie Pouchet. Sometime before 1756, he joined his cousins François Havy and Jean Lefebvre who were operating as merchants in Quebec City. Both of his cousins left during the Seven Years' War. Lévesque established a prosperous business in the wheat trade. In 1769, he married Catherine Trottier Desauniers Beaubien. In the same year, he became a justice of the peace. In 1772, he became a member of the Council and, in 1775, a member of the Legislative Council for the Province of Quebec. Lévesque died in Quebec City at the age of 54.
