= CEO compensation among charities in the United Kingdom =

Charity compensation in the UK

In the UK, CEOs of charities are compensated for their time, and the data of which is available in the public domain. In comparison to the private sector, the compensation of charity CEOs is generally substantially lower. For example Steve Robertson of the privatised Thames Water, which serves water to 10,000,000 people, received a fixed salary of £745,000 in 2018, with potential bonus of £3,750,000 in 2020. For a public-sector comparison, the UK prime minister is entitled to a salary of £167,391 and the Cabinet Secretary is entitled to a salary of £200,000 to £204,999.

The table below outlines financial data - CEO salaries and turnover figures - where available, of a selection of major charities in the United Kingdom, by capital.

Data for 2001 and 2002 is available on The Guardian's website

Charity	CEO salary (£)	Source	CEO name	Salary data sourced	Charity turnover (£)	Source	Turnover data sourced	Salary percentage (2 s.f.)
Age UK	190,000		Jonny Towers	2015	86,400,000		2016	0.22%
Amnesty International	210,000		Shalil Shetty	2015	24,900,000		2015	0.84%
Anchor Trust	420,000		Jane Ashcroft	2015	374,700,000		2017	0.11%
Arts Council England	40,000		Sir Nicholas Serota	2022	1,488,655,343		2021	0.0027%
Barnardos	209,999		Javed Khan	2019	306,000,000		2021	0.069%
BBC Children in Need	154,044		Simon Antrobus	2023	50,078,000		2023	0.31%
British Heart Foundation	180,000		Simon Gillespie	2013	158,900,000		2017	0.11%
British Red Cross	173,000		Mike Adamson	2017	251,700,000		2016	0.069%
Cancer Research UK	240,000		Harpal Kumar	2015	621,000,000		2015	0.039%
The Institute of Cancer Research	457,000		Kristian Helin	2025	131,400,000		2025	0.35%
Macmillan Cancer Support	200,000		Lynda Thomas	2022	227,145,000		2022	0.088%
NSPCC	162,000		Peter Wanless	2016	106,800,000		2016	0.15%
Oxfam	120,936		Danny Sriskandarajah	2021	400,000,000		2016	0.031%
National Trust	209,000		Hilary McGrady	2023	704,700,000		2023	0.030%
Nuffield Health	1,229,999		Steve Gray	2022	1,238,400,000		2022	0.10%
Prince's Trust	140,000		Martina Milburn	2013	610,000,000		2013	0.023%
RSPCA	162,217		Chris Sherwood	2022	152,107,708		2022	0.11%
Scope	129,000		Mark Atkinson	2015	99,500,000		2017	0.13%
Scottish SPCA	140,000		Kirsteen Campbell	2023	20,936,000		2023	0.67%
Shelter	122,500		Polly Neate	2017	58,000,000		2017	0.21%
Sightsavers	144,288		Caroline Harper	2021	261,200,000		2020	0.055%
St Andrew's Healthcare	433,000		Gil Baldwin	2017	205,600,000		2017	0.21%
St. John Ambulance	140,000		Sue Killen	2013	910,000,000		2013	0.015%
Wateraid	128,000		Barbara Frost	2016	84,000,000		2016	0.15%
Wellcome Trust	445,220		Jeremy Farrar	2017	1,134,000,000		2017	0.039%

The below table shows the inflation-adjusted, equivalent value of 100 British pounds in 2017, for previous years. It is sourced from Bank of England website:

Year	Equivalent value of £100 in 2017
2012	1.17
2013	1.09
2014	1.06
2015	1.05
2016	1.04
