= Narcissus white streak virus =

Narcissus white streak virus (NWSV)

Virus classification
- Group: Group IV ((+)ssRNA)
- Order: Unassigned
- Family: Potyviridae
- Species: Narcissus white streak virus

Species of virus

''Narcissus white streak virus (NWSV) is a plant pathogen of the family Potyviridae which infects plants of the genus Narcissus, and is transmitted by aphids. It is among the commonest and most serious of the viral infections that infect narcissi, but appears to be confined to N. tazetta.

== Description ==
This virus causes narrow greenish-purple streaks that turn white to yellow, on the leaves and flower stalk after flowering, and premature senescence, which reduces bulb size and yields.

== Taxonomy ==
Despite its importance, there is relatively little phylogenetic information on NWSV and its taxonomy remains unresolved. It has been proposed as a tentative member of the genus Potyvirus, but never formally accepted.

== Bibliography ==
- Rina Kamenetsky, Hiroshi Okubo, ed. (2012). Ornamental Geophytes: From Basic Science to Sustainable Production. CRC Press. ISBN 978-1-4398-4924-8.
- "Daffodil (Narcissus spp.)-Virus Diseases". Pacific Northwest Plant Disease Management Handbook. Oregon State University. 2014. Archived from the original on 17 December 2014.
- Berniak, Hanna; Komorowska, Beata; Sochacki, Dariusz (1 January 2013). "Detection of Narcissus Latent Virus Isolates Using One-Step Rt-Pcr Assay" (PDF). Journal of Horticultural Research. 21 (1): 11–14. doi:10.2478/johr-2013-0002. S2CID 3700211.
- "Daffodil viruses". Royal Horticultural Society. 2014.
- Brunt, A. A. (1970). "Virus diseases of Narcissus" (PDF). Daffodil Tulip Yb. 36: 18–37.
- Mowat, W.P.; Duncan, G.H.; Dawson, S. (1988). "An appraisal of the identities of Potyviruses infecting Narcissus". Acta Hort. 234 (234): 207–208. doi:10.17660/ActaHortic.1988.234.24.
