= Drossel =

Drossel may refer to:

- Barbara Drossel (born 1963), German physicist
- Heinz Drossel (1916–2008), German World War II anti-Nazi lieutenant who protected Jews and released Russian prisoners of war
- Leo Drossel, German World War II captain awarded the Knight's Cross of the Iron Cross in 1940
- Drossel von Flügel, a fictional character in the anime Fireball
- Drossel Weissberg, a fictional character in Atelier Firis: The Alchemist and the Mysterious Journey, a Japanese video game
- "Die Drossel", an 1877 composition (Lied) by Richard Strauss - see List of compositions by Richard Strauss
- Drossel, a German World War II wolfpack - see List of wolfpacks of World War II
- Drossel, a German World War II minesweeper sunk in October 1941 - see Soviet Navy surface raids on Western Black Sea
