= Barbara Fry =

British daffodil breeder

Barbara Mary "Bob" Fry BEM (1922–1997) was a British daffodil breeder and horticulturist. During her career, Fry conducted over 4000 cross-breeding experiments in order to produce disease-resistant and early-flowering daffodil cultivars. Several of her daffodil hybrids are now important commercial varieties, especially in Cornwall and the Isles of Scilly. Fry won several awards in recognition of her work, including the Royal Horticultural Society's Veitch Memorial Medal and the American Daffodil Society's gold medal. Upon her retirement, she was described by The West Briton as "an international authority" on daffodils.

== Early career ==
Fry was born in 1922 in Gloucester, and was known as 'Bob' from childhood. She served in the Women's Land Army there during the Second World War. After the war, she decided to switch to working in horticulture and was placed in a private garden in the Cotswolds. She stayed there for around six months, later saying that it "was only a short time but very good basic training". Fry went on to study at the Kent Horticulture Institute before moving to Cornwall in 1947 to work at a flower farm in St Keverne growing anemones, polyanthus and daffodils.

== Work at Rosewarne ==
In the 1950s, (Note: The exact year of Fry beginning to work at Rosewarne is unclear. The West Briton gives 1957, while The Sunday Telegraph's Mandrake column gives 1955.) Fry was employed as a field assistant at Rosewarne Experimental Horticulture Station (Note: Rosewarne Experimental Horticulture Station was run as a Agricultural Development and Advisory Services (ADAS) site under the auspices of the Ministry of Agriculture between 1952 and 1989. It was later made part of Duchy College.) in Camborne, Cornwall. Starting in 1963, Fry ran a programme of daffodil hybridisation along with H. J. Eaton, the station's director, aiming to produce new types of early-flowering daffodils which would be commercially viable in terms of yield, quality, health and vase life. According to David Willis, this was the first government-sponsored daffodil breeding programme in England.

The programme was prompted by 'Rijnveld's Early Sensation' (RES), a cultivar registered by Dutch grower F. Rijnveld & Sons in 1956, which flowered up to six weeks earlier than Golden Harvest, the then-standard early-flowering variety. However, RES's poorer qualities (low yield, short stems and "indifferent flower quality") made it less viable as a commercial variety. By crossing other daffodil varieties with RES, its early-flowering tendency could be passed on while also allowing the quality to be increased.

The breeding and selection process took many years, as daffodils take four or five years to flower. At Rosewarne, new seeds would be planted and take a year or two to germinate before being replanted with more space in the third year. Over the next four seasons, the daffodils would be evaluated and selected. Once there were sufficient bulbs of a given variety, final trials would be run over a further four seasons. Fry herself said that varieties being grown in the 1980s had first been pollinated more than 20 years before.

The breeding programme ran until the 1980s and the last pollinations were made in 1981. The programme was gradually wound down after Fry's retirement in 1983, although she continued to help with evaluation of seedlings on a part-time basis for several years afterwards. The West Briton reported that Fry had left her job "reluctantly", having reached the retirement age for civil servants.

=== Varieties ===
Despite a high failure rate of almost 98% "because [the flowers'] shape, colour or stems were not perfect", the breeding programme at Rosewarne produced a number of successful daffodil varieties.

The first garden varieties, called 'Bob Minor' and 'Small Fry', were both named after Fry and released in 1979. Bob Minor was a bright yellow trumpet variety, bred from 'M J Berkeley' and 'Tanagra', which flowered in February in Cornwall. Small Fry was a lemon yellow trumpet variety, bred from 'M J Berkeley' and the Asturian daffodil, which flowered as early as January.

The first varieties for commercial production, called 'Tamara' and 'Tamsyn', (Note: 'Tamsyn' is also spelt 'Tamsin' in some sources.) were released in 1981. Tamara was a cross between Rijnveld's Early Sensation and 'Trenance' which had been seeded in 1964 and flowered up to 20 days early than Golden Harvest. Tamsyn was a cross between St Keverne and 'Joseph Macleod' which had been seeded in 1965 and flowered up to six days earlier than Golden Harvest. The rights to grow the two varieties were subject to a sealed auction in April 1981, with Cornish growers forming a consortium to bid for the 2000 bulbs on offer. Tamara was sold to the Cornwall Area Bulb Growers' Association and Tamsyn was sold to Lingarden, a growers co-operative in Lincolnshire.

They were followed by four tazetta varieties which were bought by growers on the Isles of Scilly; the breeding process for these varieties had begun in 1969 when the stocks of 'Soleil d'Or' tazetta which were grown on Scilly were reported to be deteriorating.

== Honours ==
Fry was awarded the British Empire Medal in 1973 for services to agriculture. She was presented with the medal by Lord Lieutenant of Cornwall Sir John Carew Pole at a ceremony in Camborne.

The Royal Horticultural Society awarded Fry the Peter Barr Memorial Cup in 1974 and the Veitch Memorial Medal in 1978. She was also awarded the Gold Medal of the American Daffodil Society in 1981 for being "instrumental in producing a new range of flowers" which were "destined to brighten the homes and bring joy to the heart of the everyday citizen".

== Personal life and death ==
Fry retired in March 1983 after 26 years working at Rosewarne. After her retirement, Fry continued to grow daffodils at her home in Camborne and in her allotment, winning awards at flower shows. She died in November 1997; her obituary in The West Briton noted that "her work was her vocation, her hobby and her life."

== See also ==
- Agriculture in Cornwall
