= Zisk =

Zisk is a surname. Notable people with the surname include:

- Craig Zisk (born 1950), American director and producer, brother of Randall
- Randall Zisk, American television director and producer
- Richie Zisk (born 1949), American baseball player

== See also ==
- Lisk
