= Jacques Barbel =

Jacques Barbel (c. 1670 – 30 July 1740) was a French soldier in New France who stayed in the area after the end of his military service. His daughter, Marie-Anne Barbel and her husband, Louis Fornel became successful merchants as well.

Barbel was an active participant in the region from 1687. He at various times was a judge, a royal notary and an important legal practitioner. He was a seigneur and, for a time, acted as secretary to the Intendant of New France, Michel Bégon de la Picardière.
