= Bärbel =

- Gender: Female
- Language: German
- Name day: 4 December

Origin
- Region of origin: German-speaking areas

Other names
- Derived: From barbaros (Greek: βάρβαρος) meaning "strange" or "foreign"
- Related names: Barbara

Bärbel is a German-language feminine given name, often a diminutive or variant of the name Barbara.

Notable people with the name include:

- Bärbel Bas (born 1968), German politician
- Bärbel Bendiks (born 1950), German rower
- Bärbel Beuermann (born 1955), German politician
- Bärbel Bohley (1945–2010), German artist and politician
- Bärbel Broschat (born 1957), East German hurdler
- Bärbel Dieckmann (born 1949), German politician
- Bärbel Fuhrmann (born 1940), German swimmer
- Bärbel Graf, East German high jumper
- Bärbel Grimmer (born 1945), German swimmer
- Bärbel Höhn (born 1952), German politician
- Bärbel Hönisch (born 1974), German paleoclimatologist
- Bärbel Inhelder (1913–1997), Swiss psychologist
- Bärbel Jungmeier (born 1975), Austrian cyclist
- Bärbel Kampmann (1946–1999), Afro-German psychologist, writer
- Bärbel Kleedehn (1952–2022), German politician
- Bärbel Kofler (born 1967), German politician
- Bärbel Koribalski (born 1964), German astrophysicist
- Bärbel Körner, West German slalom canoeist
- Bärbel Köster (1957–2025), East German canoeist
- Bärbel Löhnert (born 1942), German long jumper
- Bärbel Martin (born 1940), German figure skater
- Bärbel Mayer (born 1935), German sprinter
- Bärbel Mohr (1964–2010), German author
- Bärbel Podeswa (born 1946), East German hurdler
- Bärbel Richter
- Bärbel Schäfer (born 1963), German television presenter and talk show host
- Bärbel Struppert (born 1950), East German sprinter
- Bärbel Wartenberg-Potter (born 1943), German theologian
- Bärbel Wöckel (born 1955), East German sprinter
- Bärbel Wohlleben (born 1943), German footballer

== See also ==
- Barbel (disambiguation)
