= Barb (name) =

Barb is a feminine given name, often a short form (hypocorism) of Barbara. It is also sometimes a surname.

== People ==
=== Given name ===
- Barb Bellini (born 1977), Canadian retired volleyball player
- Barbara Barb Bond (born 1962), American former rugby union player, United States team captain in 1991
- Barbara Barb Bunkowsky (born 1958), Canadian former LPGA golfer
- Barbara Barb Goodwin (born 1949), American politician
- Barb Haley (born 1963/64), American politician
- Barbara Barb Hayden, New Zealand marine biologist
- Barb Honchak (born 1979), American professional mixed martial artist
- Barb Jungr (born 1954), English singer, songwriter, composer and writer
- Barb Kniff McCulla (born 1956), American politician
- Barbara Lindquist (born 1969), American triathlete
- Barbara Barb Miller (born 1958/59), Canadian politician
- Barb Mucha (born 1961), American LPGA golfer
- Barbara Barb Spencer (born 1966), Canadian curler
- Barb Tarbox (1961–2003), Canadian anti-smoking activist
- Barb Whitehead (born 1961), American LPGA golfer
- Barb Yarusso (born 1956), American politician

=== Surname ===
- Alphons Barb (1901–1979), Austrian-born academic, archaeologist, numismatist, museum director and author
- Heinrich Alfred Barb (1826–1883), academic, university director, civil servant, interpreter and author, director of the Oriental Institute of Vienna

=== Nicknamed ===
- Louis Barbarin (1902–1997), American jazz drummer nicknamed "Lil Barb"

== Fictional characters ==
- Barbara Henrickson, on HBO's TV series Big Love
- Barb, on the TV series Witches of East End

== See also ==
- Barbe, including Barbé
- Barb (disambiguation)
- Barbara (disambiguation)
