= Barbro =

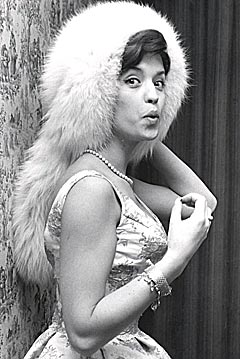
Lill-Babs represented Sweden in the 1961 Eurovision Song Contest in Cannes with the song "April, April"

Barbro is a female given name in Sweden, with the same origin as Barbara.

In a village in Dalecarlia, Barbro is also an "estate name", a unisex concept not taken into account in the Swedish name law, which leads to some confusion.

Noted bearers of the name include:

- Barbro Alving (1909–1987), Swedish journalist and writer
- Barbro Eriksdotter (died 1553), Swedish noble
- Barbro Feltzing (born 1945), Swedish Green Party politician, member of the Riksdag 1994–2002
- Barbro Hietala Nordlund (born 1946), Swedish social democratic politician, member of the Riksdag 1994–1998 and 2001–2006
- Barbro Hiort af Ornäs (1921–2015), Swedish film actress
- Barbro Holmberg (born 1952), Swedish Social Democratic politician
- Barbro Cecilia Johansson (1912–1999), Swedish-Tanzanian missionary
- Barbro Kollberg (1917–2014), Swedish film actress
- Babben Larsson (born 1956), Swedish actress and comedian
- Barbro Lönnkvist (born 1959), Swedish orienteering competitor
- Barbro Lindgren (born 1937), Swedish children's books writer
- Barbro Martinsson (born 1935), Swedish cross-country skier
- Barbro Nilsson (1899–1983), Swedish textile artist
- Barbro Oborg (born 1941), Swedish actress
- Barbro Owens-Kirkpatrick (born 1946), American diplomat
- Barbro Sachs-Osher (born 1940), Swedish diplomat
- Barbro Sundback (born 1945), Ålandic politician
- Barbro Margareta Svensson (Lill-Babs) (1938–2018), Swedish singer
- Barbro Westerholm (1933–2023), Swedish politician
