= Barbara Harris =

Barbara Harris may refer to:

- Barbara Harris (bishop) (1930–2020), first woman ordained a bishop in the Anglican Communion
- Barbara Harris (actress) (1935–2018), American actress
- Barbara Eve Harris (born 1959), Canadian actress
- Barbara Harris (singer) (born 1945), lead singer of the R&B group The Toys
- Barbara Harris (voice casting director)
- Barbara Harris (born 1951), fifth wife and widow of Cary Grant
- Barbara Harris, former Miss California
- Barbara Harris, birth control activist, founder of Project Prevention (formerly known as C.R.A.C.K.)
