= François Havy =

French merchant (1709–1766)

François Havy (1709 – December 12, 1766) was a French merchant who operated in Quebec. Havy managed the Quebec business of the French shipping firm Dugard et Cie. While the company's Quebec activities were modest when Havy first established the office in 1732, by 1741 he was handling a full fifth of the colony's imports. They oversaw the construction of six ships for the company.

His assistant was his cousin Jean Lefebvre, with whom he formed a partnership to pursue other business opportunities while retaining their positions at Dugard et Cie. Eventually, Dugard et Cie's ships were lost to privateers or storms and the firm withdrew from Canada. Lefebvre and Havy's business grew steadily, as they personally handled cargos and eventually came to own a small ship of their own, the Parfaite Union.

They experienced a setback when they invested in a sealing station in Labrador with Louis Bazil and Louis Fornel, and retained their interest in it until the 1745 capture of the Fortress of Louisbourg by Anglo-Americans cut them off from it. They lost about a third of their original 100,000 livre investment.

In 1756, partly out of a desire to marry (as a Huguenot, he could not do so in Quebec) and partly motivated by the looming threat of the Seven Years' War, Havy returned to France to oversee the transfer of as much of the business as possible there. When the British captured Quebec in 1759 much of his and Lefebvre's assets in New France – in mortgages, Canadian paper money, and bills of exchange – were declared worthless by the new government. However, the pair joined with another cousin, François Levesque, as a partner to conclude what business remained, and Levesque carried on as a merchant in British Canada for some time.
