= Lisk =

Lisk is a surname. Notable people with this surname include:

- Alphonso Lisk-Carew (1887–1969), Sierra Leonean photographer
- Barbara Lisk (born 1952), American politician
- Dennis Lisk, (born 1977), also known as Denyo, German singer
- Kati Lisk, victim of Richard Evonitz
- Pierre Lisk (born 1971), Sierra Leonean sprinter
- Ricarda Lisk (born 1981), German triathlete

== See also ==
- Long Island serial killer
