= Louis Bazil =

Louis Bazil (1695 – February 20, 1752) was a French merchant and militia officer in New France.

Bazil traded between his home in Quebec and La Rochelle, as well as Martinique and Île Royale. He was well-connected; in 1736, he was granted a concession to administer a sealing station in Labrador. Having no capital of his own, he formed a company with François Havy, Jean Lefebvre, and Louis Fornel, but the enterprise was a failure and Bazil, unable to pay his share of the company's debts, lost his concession to his partners.

Throughout the 1740s, he was hounded by creditors, but he escaped poverty when his connections secured him a writership at Domaine d’Occident. Even so, he needed to lease a portion of his home for use as a tavern in order to make ends meet.

When he died, his house was sold to pay his debtors.
