= Barbara Dürk =

Barbara Dürk (28 February 1949, Freiburg im Breisgau — 20 April 2014, Frankfurt am Main) was a German trade union functionary, publicist and management consultant.

== Life ==
Barbara Dürk was born in Freiburg im Breisgau and spent her childhood in the Black Forest. After A-levels, she initially studied at Frankfurt am Main to become a teacher. She also completed a locksmith's apprenticeship and in 1984 applied to a university lecturer who was looking for a skilled worker for a third-party funded project. Her application was not accepted because of her gender. Barbara Dürk took legal action against this, but lost at the Hessian State Labour Court in Frankfurt am Main with the judgement of 4 December 1985 - 2 Sa 625/85. She then lodged a Constitutional Complaint with the Federal Constitutional Court, because she had been discriminated against because of her gender. After eight years, on 16 November 1993, the decision was made in her favour.

After training as a locksmith, Dürk attended the Academy of Labour at the University of Frankfurt am Main (today: European Academy of Labour). She then worked in the ÖTV-Hesse as trade union secretary for women and environmental protection. At ÖTV, she initiated a campaign to improve the status of typical women's occupations in the public sector. According to some of her fellow campaigners, she did "pioneering work in women's politics" in this context. At the same time, she published alongside other non-lawyers on the concept of equal work, e.g. in 1990 with Wenn das Brunnenmädchen im Heilbad den Hahn zudreht, which preceded the later legal discourse. Additional focal points of her work were the development of alternatives to privatisation, especially for women's jobs, as well as women's interests in the modernisation of public services. She was committed to the implementation of more flexible working time models to enable women in particular to better reconcile working life and family.

From 1993, Dürk worked as a management consultant. Together with Karin Kraus, she founded the "Büro für neue Zeitpraxis" institute to further develop working time models, network practitioners, academics and institutions and facilitate the exchange of experience. Among others, the institute's sponsors were Margret Mönig-Raane, then deputy Ver.di chairwoman, Hans-Günter Henneke and Herbert Mai. Dürk and Kraus advised administrations and municipal organisations and companies as part of the "New Time Practice" project. Over the course of the project, working hours and opening times were organised more flexibly in cooperation with all those involved. The aim was to be able to offer more family-friendly working hours for a better compatibility of family and career, but also more customer-friendly opening hours.

In collaboration with the trade unionist Renate Sternatz, Barbara Dürk dealt with the practical implementation of the Leistungsentgelts collective agreement for the public service, which was introduced across the board in 2005. Dürk and Sternatz described for employees, staff councils and company management how performance pay - remuneration based on performance and not on time - can be linked to target agreements and used for the benefit of all those involved. From 2010 to 2012, Dürk and Renate Sternatz carried out a pilot project on demographic change in Germany. This was implemented in a number of municipalities in Germany. Together with employees from various areas of work, she developed models for age-appropriate work.

Dürk died on 20 April 2014.
