= Barbara Seal =

Canadian judge

Barbara Seal is a former judge from Montreal, Quebec, Canada. Seal has been involved in a number of community organisations and foundations, serving in both leadership and advisory roles. Seal was appointed as judge of Canada's citizenship court in 1997, retiring in 2016. Seal is a recipient of the Order of Canada Award (OAM).

== Career ==
Barbara Seal is a former city councillor for the city of Hampstead, Quebec.

== Charity work ==
Seal's charity and community leadership work has included membership on the boards of the Children's Wish Foundation, the Canadian Cancer Society. In the arts, Judge Seal has served on the boards of Place des Arts, the Montreal Arts Council, and serves on the board of directors for the National Arts Centre Foundation. She is the National President of the Canadian Friends of Tel Aviv University.

== Barbara Seal Scholarship ==
In 2012, Seal established the Barbara Seal Scholarship for Newcomers to Canada at McGill University, dedicated to permanent residents and new citizens.
