= Barbara Rosiak =

Polish graphic artist and painter (born 1955)

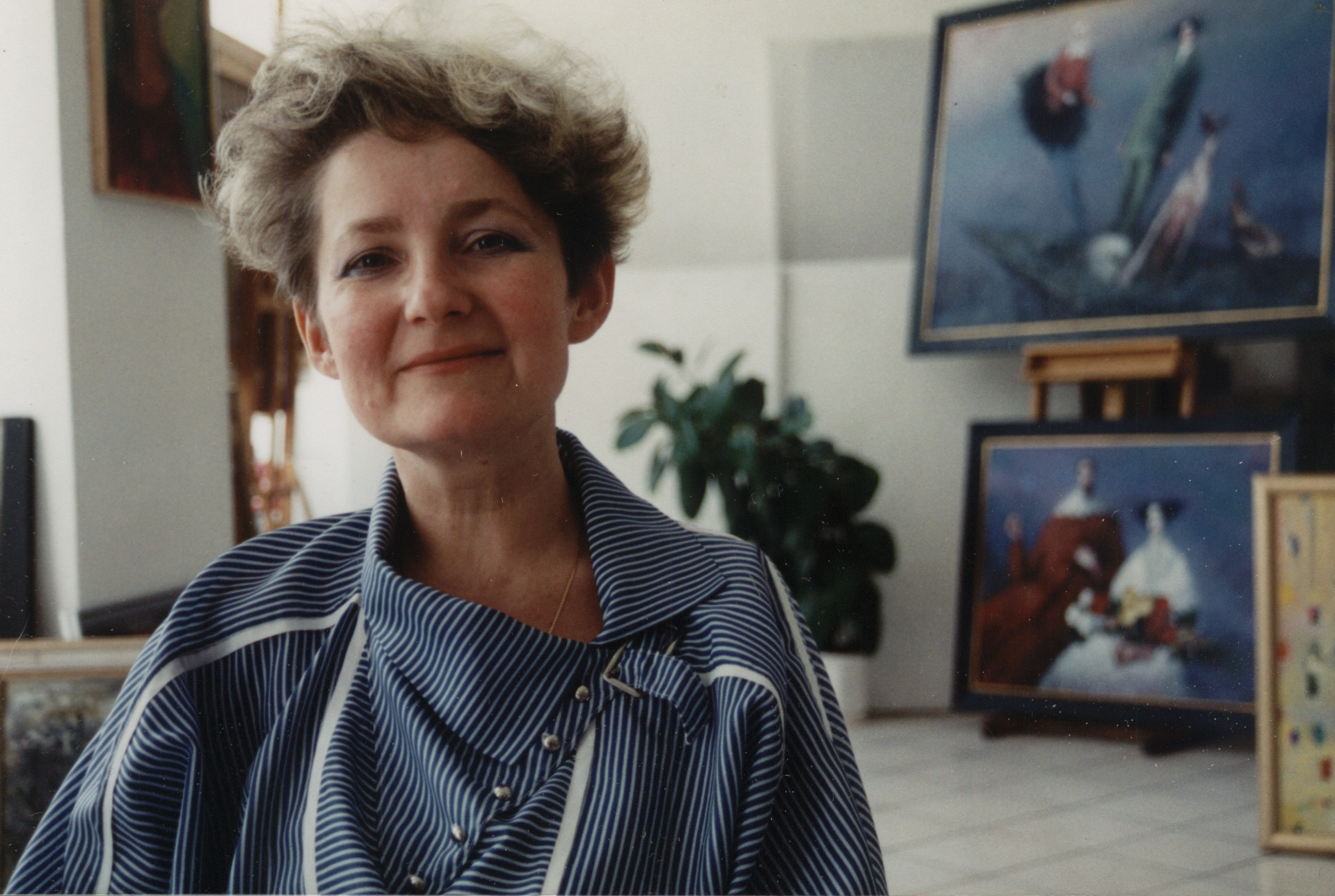
- Born: March 3, 1955 (age 71); Lodz, Poland
- Education: Wladyslaw Strzeminski Academy of Fine Arts
- Occupations: Graphic artist, painter
- Years active: 1979-present

Barbara Rosiak (born March 3, 1955, in Lodz, Poland) is a Polish graphic artist and painter. She is known for her various types of paintings, utilizing techniques such as intaglio printing, color etching (sometimes with aquatint), as well as soft varnish. Other painting types include watercolor paintings and pastel paintings. Throughout her career, she has held 30 solo exhibitions and has participated in over 100 group exhibitions and competitions worldwide. She currently lives and works in her hometown of Lodz, Poland.

== Career ==
Rosiak studied at the Faculty of Painting and Graphic Arts of the State Higher School of Fine Arts (PWSSP) (known today as the Władysław Strzemiński Academy of Fine Arts) in Lodz, Poland from 1974 to 1979. She specialized primarily in printmaking. She later earned a diploma of distinction from the intaglio studio of Professor Leszek Rozga and an award in painting from the studio of Professor Stanisław Fijałkowski in 1979.

== Style ==
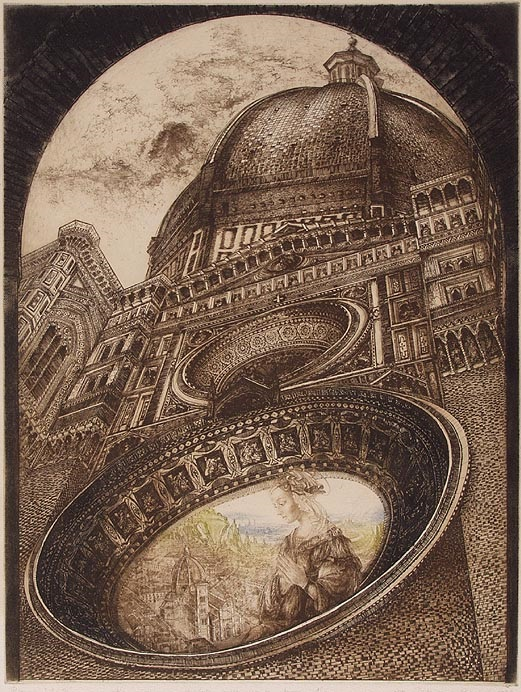
Colored etching, "Florence - Il Duomo"

Her compositions incorporate themes that are elaborate and symbolic, showcasing landscapes or vedutas. Her compositions also combine architectural motifs and figurative models from ancient paintings (Madonnas, nudes, etc.), as well as decorative details and ornaments from various historical periods such as the Baroque and Renaissance era, often depicted in odd perspectives. She has also created her own bookplates.

== Solo exhibitions ==
- 1979 KMPiK – Club – Łódź
- 1980
  - "GP" Gallery – Warsaw
  - Gallery Bö Landsjö – Malmö
  - "Chimera" Gallery – BWA – Łódź
  - Gallery "Gimle Kunstsirkel" – Oslo
- 1981
  - Gallery Forni – Amsterdam
  - Gallery Tullgatan 1 – Malmö
- 1983
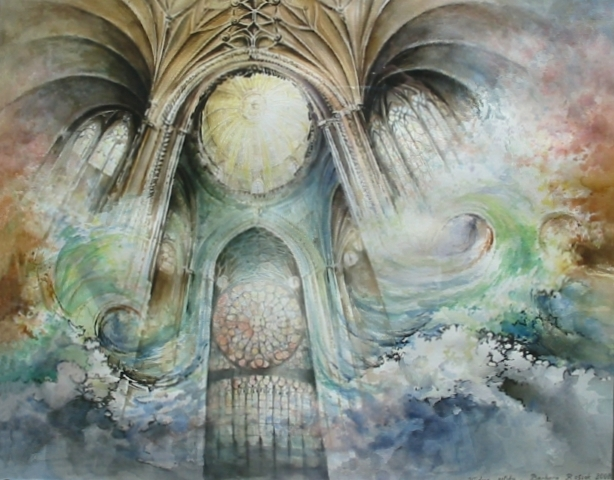
  - Watercolor painting, "The Gothic Spectre"
    PSP Gallery – Toruń
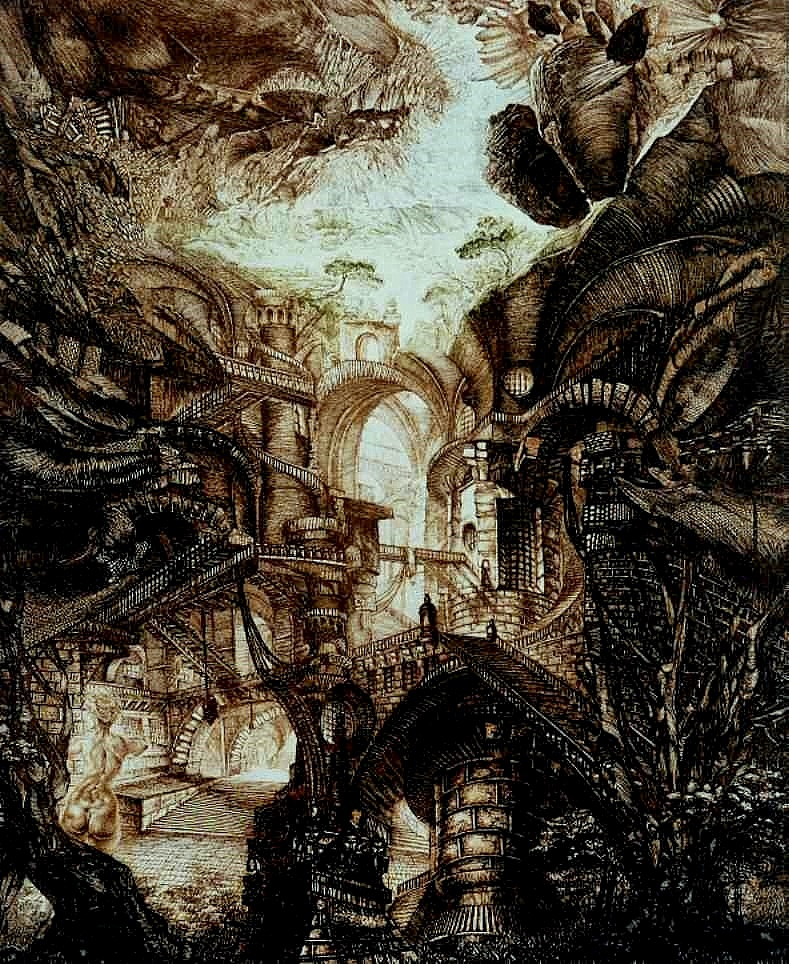
  - Colored etching, "Fortress of Emotions"
    Gallery "Samlargrafik" – Kristianstad
- 1984
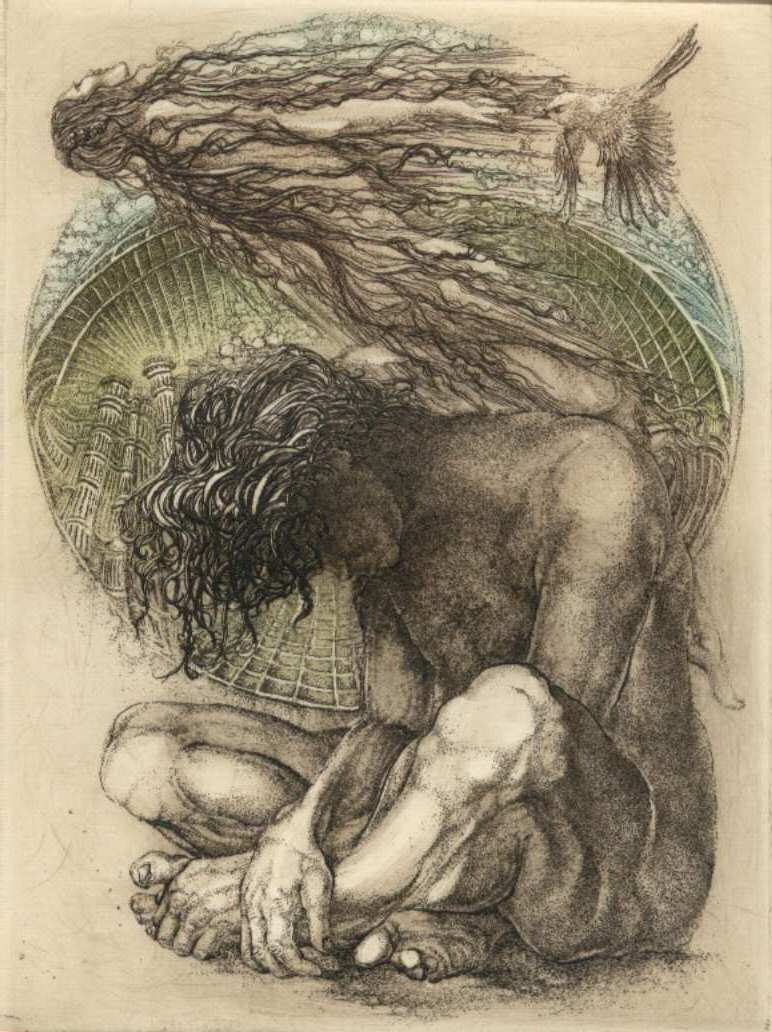
  - Colored etching, "Regret"
    Religious Art Gallery – PAX – Łódź
  - Polish Information and Culture Center – Sofia
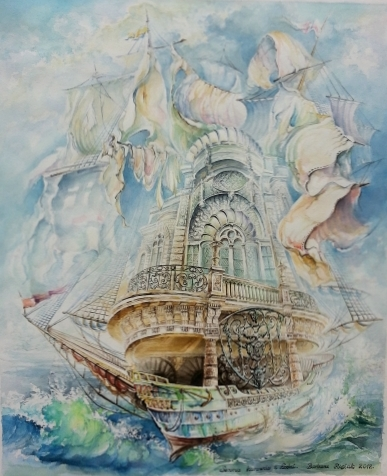
    Watercolor painting, "Sleepy Caravel"
  - KMPiK – Club – Poznań
  - BWA Gallery – Konin
- 1985 Main Library Gallery – WSP Zielona Góra
- 1986
  - Euroart Gallery – Ottawa
  - BWA Gallery – Leszno
- 1986 Scheltema Boekhandel – Amsterdam
- 1987 JA Baruch Gallery – Chicago
- 1988 Graphics and Poster Gallery 72 – Poznań
- 1990 K. Napiórkowska Gallery – Old Market Square, Warsaw
- 1991 "Aneks" Graphics and Poster Gallery – Poznań
- 1994 Art Gallery – Department of Culture and Education, Szczecinek
- 1997 Pastoral Care Center for Creative Communities – Łódź
- 1998 "Chimera – Villa" Gallery – BWA – Łódź
- 2000 Gallery "Samlargrafik" – Fjalkinge
- 2001 Art Gallery – 6th Branch of PKO BP Łódź
- 2002 Exlibris Gallery – Podgórze Cultural Center – Kraków
- 2006 K. Napiórkowska Gallery – Old Town Square, Warsaw
- 2008 Ars Nova Gallery – Exhibition Hall, Łódź
- 2014 Exhibition and Lecture – University of the Third Age at the Sanctuary of Divine Mercy – Łódź
- 2017 – 2018 Retrospective Exhibition of Graphics and Paintings on the occasion of the 40th anniversary of creative work – Mirror Room and Main Hall at the Museum of the City of Lodz – Łódź

== Major exhibitions in Poland ==
- 8th and 10th International Graphic Art Biennial in Krakow – BWA, Krakow. 1980, 1983
- Small Graphic Forms – BWA / Municipal Art Gallery, Łódź. 1981, 1983, 1985, 1999, 2002, 2005, 2011
- "INTERART" Art Fair – BWA, Poznań. 1985
- Łódź Spring Salon – BWA, Łódź. 1986
- International Biennial of Contemporary Exlibris – Malbork Castle Museum. 1988, 1990, 1992, 1994, 1996, 2000
- International Triennial "MEZZOTINTA" – BWA, Sopot. 1988
- Biennial of Small Graphic Forms and Exlibris – Ostrów Wielkopolski City Museum – Town Hall, Ostrów Wielkopolski. 1991, 2001, 2005
- 1st Baltic Countries Graphic Art Triennial – Abbots' Palace, City Hall, Gdańsk – Oliwa. 1992
- International Exhibition of Small Graphic Forms "Kontakt / 93" - Voivodeship Cultural Center, Toruń. 1993
- Lodz Art Presentations – BWA, Lodz. 1994
- National Exhibition "Contemporary Polish Exlibris" – District Museum, Rzeszów. 1995
- International Exlibris Graphic Competition – Municipal Public Library, Gliwice. 1997, 1999, 2001, 2005
- Wrocław Exlibris and Small Graphic Forms – Pod Plafonem Gallery. Municipal Public Library, Wrocław. 1999
- 4th and 5th Krakow Biennial of Polish Exlibris – Voivodeship Public Library, Podgórze Cultural Center, Krakow. 2000, 2002
- 3rd Lublin Forum of Small Graphics: "Art – Education" – Vetter Gallery, MDK, Lublin. 2002
- Interdisciplinary exhibition as part of the Warsaw Art Festival: "In the Shadow of the Cathedrals" – Steel Forest Gallery, Stara Papiernia, Konstancin Jeziorna. 2006
- Small Graphics Forum – Faculty of Fine Arts, Catholic University of Lublin, “Pod Podłogą” Gallery, Lublin. 2007
- Interdisciplinary exhibition as part of the Night of Museums "Autographs" - Polish Academy of Sciences Archives - Staszic Palace, Warsaw. 2010
- Group exhibition accompanying the 14th Triennial of Small Graphic Forms: "Łódź – City of Graphics" – Art Propaganda Center, Łódź, 2011
- "Leszek Rózga – Professor and Adepts" – Kobro Gallery, Academy of Fine Arts in Łódź, 2014
- 10th International Graphic Competition for Exlibris 'GLIWICE 2014' - Municipal Public Library in Gliwice. 2014
- 15th INTERNATIONAL TRENNIAL OF SMALL GRAPHIC FORM – Municipal Art Gallery “WILLA” – Łódź. 2014
- "Leszek Rózga – Professor and Adepts" – University Gallery of the Institute of Art – Faculty of Arts, University of Silesia – Cieszyn. 2015
- Exhibition of Łódź Bookplates – Municipal Art Gallery in Łódź – "CHIMERA" Gallery. Łódź. 2016

== Worldwide exhibitions ==
- ART EXPO – Ars Polona DESA organization, New York, USA. 1980
- Small Graphic Forms – Ars Polona DESA organization. Gallery Depolma, Düsseldorf, Germany. 1981
- Art Fair "MUBA" – organized by Ars Polona DESA, Zurich, Basel, Switzerland 1981, 1983
- Polish Color Graphics – exhibition entitled "Landscape" – organized by CBWA. Caracas, Venezuela 1982
- Polish Graphic Miniature – organized by BWA. Polish Institute, Stockholm, Sweden 1983
- Exhibition of 10 Young Polish Graphic Artists – Cultural Center, Bourges, France 1984
- Colorful Graphics from Poland – Århus, Lolland, Falsters, Copenhagen, Fredriksberg, Denmark 1984
- Polish Graphic Arts – organized by BWA. Gallery Otomo, Osaka, Nagoya, Towo Art Center, Tokyo, Japan 1984
- Polish Art – BWA organization. Steyer–Daimler-Benz Auto Show Vienna, Austria 1985
- "Art Never Seen" Exhibition – Euroart Gallery, Ottawa, Canada. 1985
- International Graphic Arts Salon – Palais de la Beaujoire, Nantes, France 1985
- Łódź Graphic Art Exhibition – organized by BWA / Łódź. National Museum, Tampere, Finland 1986
- Polish Landscape – Interdisciplinary Exhibition – CBWA Organization. Rabat, Morocco. 1986
- Annual International Exhibition Of Miniature Art – Del Bello Gallery. Toronto. Canada. 1986, 1987
- XXII & XXIII Prix International D'Art Contemporain de Monte Carlo – Musee National. Monte-Carlo, Monaco 1988, 1989
- Salon of Eastern European Art – Town Art Gallery, Damme, Netherlands. 1989
- II Festival International de Gravue de / Menton Les Pays De/L/East – Musee de Prehistoire Regionale. Menton. France. 1989
- International Art Competition: “Art Horizons” – Gallery 52. Soho. New York. USA. 1989
- XXIII International Exlibris Congress – Mönchengladbach, Germany. 1990
- "Small is Beautiful" – Exhibition of the Ministry of Foreign Affairs – Polish Institute. Paris, France. 1990
- Internationale Biennale Of Small Graphic & Exlibris: “Eros” – Stadhuis, Sint Niklaas. Belgium. – 1991
- "Utopie sains illusion" – Competition for the 700th Anniversary of the Founding of Switzerland. Book Publication. Atelier Contraste, Fribourg, Switzerland. 1991
- International Exlibris Congress – Dajmaru Fuji – Department Store, Sapporo. Japan. 1992
- International Competition: "Exlibris etching for the 400th anniversary of the birth of Jacques Callot" – Metiatheque – Municipal Library, Nancy, France. 1992
- XVII International Independent Exhibition of Prints – Kanagawa Prefecture Gallery Auction, Yurino Stationery House Gallery. Yokohama. Japan. 1992, 1995
- Concorso Internationale: "Exlibris Cristoforo Colombo 1492 - 1992, 500th Anniversary" - Palazzo Serra Gerace. Genova. Italy. 1992
- 10th Jubilaumus Triennial schedule – Stadsaal. Frechen. Germany. 1993
- II & III International Exhibition Of Prints – Ino-Cho Paper Museum. Kochi. Japan. 1993, 1996
- I Internationale Grafik Biennale Maastricht – Exhibition & Congress – Center (MECC), Maastricht. Netherlands. 1993
- British International Miniature Print Exhibition – City Gallery, Leicester off Centre Gallery. Bristol, UK. 1994
- XIII Biennial of Print Art – Ibiza – Museo de Arte Contemporareiro de Ibiza – Ibiza. Balearic Islands. Spain. 1994
- II International Exhibition & Publication – Taiwan Exlibris Club, National Central Library, Taipei. Taiwan. 1994
- 11th International Grafik Triennial – Stadtsaal. Frechen. Germany – 1996
- International Graphic Competition: "Il Giubileo en il Nuovo Millennio" - Palazzo Sirena. Francavilla Al Mare. Italy. 2000
- XXVIII International Exlibris Congress: "FISAE" – Boston, Massachusetts, 2000
- 1st Qingdao Biennial of Print & Exhibition – Qingdao Art Gallery. Qingdao, China 2000
- 1st International Print Biennale in Beijing – Beijing Yan Huang Art Gallery, Beijing, China 2003
- Contemporain Art Fair – "ST-ART" – Congress. Strasbourg, France. 2004, 2005, 2006
- Exhibition of works by Polish graphic masters – organizers: Embassy of the Republic of Poland and the Ministry of Information, Culture and Tourism of Laos – VIENTIAN Center / National Museum. Laos. 2012
- "Between Heaven and Earth" – Exhibition of graphics from the collection of the Municipal Art Gallery in Łódź. MUSEUM OF EASTERN AND WESTERN ART in Odessa, Consulate General of the Republic of Poland in Odessa. Polish Institute in Kyiv. Ukraine. 2018

== Awards ==
- 1980 First prize in the religious art competition in the graphics department – PAX Gallery in Łódź, Poland
- 1985 First prize of the "Smok" gallery in the "Eroticism in Graphic Miniature" competition - Municipal Galleries in Słubice and Gorzów Wielkopolski, Poland
- 1987 Honorable Mention in the 10th Open Graphics Competition. BWA Municipal Gallery in Łódź, Poland
- 1991 First Prize and Special Prize of the Municipal Museum in the 4th Biennial of Small Graphics and Exlibris – Museum of Ostrów Wielkopolski, Poland
- 1992 Honorable Mention in the International Bookplate Competition for the 400th Anniversary of the Birth of Jacques Callot – Nancy Municipal Library, France
- 1999 Third Prize in the 3rd International Contemporary Exlibris Competition – Gliwice Municipal Library. Poland
- 2000 Honorary Medal at the 4th Krakow Biennial of Contemporary Exlibris – Krakow Municipal Library. Poland
- 2000 Honorable Mention at the 1st International Graphic Art Biennial "New Millennium Jubilee" – Sirena Palace in Francavilla al Mare, Italy
- 2000 Silver Medal at the Graphic Arts Biennial, Qingdao Municipal Art Gallery, China
- 2003 Honorable Mention and Tai-He Master Prize at the 1st Beijing International Print Biennial. International Exchange Center and Yan Huang Gallery, Beijing, China

== Museums/galleries featuring her work ==
- BWA (Office of Artistic Exhibitions) – Łódź – (currently) Municipal Art Gallery
- CBWA (Central Bureau of Artistic Exhibitions) – Warsaw
- BWA – Konin, Leszno, Toruń, Poznań
- National Museum – Szczecin, Toruń
- National Museum – Print Room – Poznań
- Library of the Higher Pedagogical School – Zielona Góra
- Forestry Museum – Forest Culture Centre – Gołuchów
- Castle Museum – Malbork, Poland
- Ostrów Wielkopolski City Museum
- Abbots Museum – Gdańsk – Oliwa
- Musee National – Monte-Carlo, Monaco
- Stadt Museum – Sint-Niklaas, Belgium
- Collection of Atelier Contraste – Fribourg, Switzerland
- Mediatheque – Municipal Library – Nancy, France
- Collections of the Prefecture Gallery – Kanagawa – Yokhama, Japan
- Ino-Cho Parer Museum – Kochi, Japan
- Museo De Arte Contemporareiro – Ibiza, Balearic Islands, Spain
- National Central Library - Taipei. Taiwan.
- Collections of the Stadtsaal – Frechen, Germany
- Collection Gallery 52 – Soho – New York, United States
- Collection of the Del Bello Gallery – Toronto, Canada
- Collections of Tilbury's Gallery – Sint Truiden, Belgium
- Off Centre Gallery Collection – Bristol, UK
- Collection of Euroart Gallery – Ottawa, Canada
- Provincial and Municipal Public Library – Wrocław
- Municipal Public Library – Gliwice
- Provincial Public Library – Kraków
- Collection of the Exlibris Gallery "Podgórze" – Kraków
- District Museum – Rzeszów.
- Collections of Palazzo Sirena – Francavilla Al Mare, Italy
- Collections of the Qingdao Art Gallery – Qingdao, China
- Boston Public Library Collections – Boston, Massachusetts
- International Cultural Exchange Center – Beijing, China
- PAN Archives – Staszic Palace. Warsaw
