= Barbara McAlister =

Barbara McAlister may refer to:

- Barbara McAlister (diver)
- Barbara McAlister (mezzo-soprano)
