= Barbara Bates (American physician) =

American physician, author and historian

Dr. Barbara Bates
- Born: 1928; Auburn, New York
- Died: December 18, 2002 (aged 74); Bryn Mawr, Pennsylvania
- Education: Smith College; Cornell University
- Medical career
- Profession: Physician
- Field: Internal medicine
- Institutions: University of Kentucky; University of Missouri-Kansas City; University of Rochester; University of Pennsylvania
- Sub-specialties: Writing
- Research: Role of the nurse practitioner

Barbara Bates, MD, MA (1928 – December 18, 2002) was an American physician, author and historian. She authored a leading medical textbook on physical examination. Bates was on the faculty at several U.S. medical schools, and she was on both the medical and nursing school faculties at the University of Pennsylvania. She helped to develop the role of the nurse practitioner in American healthcare and she wrote a thorough account on the history of tuberculosis in Pennsylvania.

== Biography ==
=== Education and early life ===
Bates attended Smith College as an undergraduate and earned a medical degree at Cornell University. She also completed a medical residency at Cornell. Once her medical career was established, Bates earned two master's degrees in history, one from the University of Kansas and one from the University of Pennsylvania.

=== Medical career ===
After completion of her residency training, Bates established an internal medicine practice in Greenwich, Connecticut. She subsequently worked with the University of Kentucky and the University of Rochester. In 1976, she moved on to the University of Missouri-Kansas City, which was establishing a six-year post-high school medical program to increase the supply of rural physicians. In 1980, Bates came to the University of Pennsylvania, where she was a faculty member in nursing and in medicine. She also held an appointment at MCP Hahnemann University.

Bates became known for contributions beyond direct patient care and teaching. Her first book, A Guide to Physical Examination and History Taking, was written in 1974 and published in eleven languages. In her obituary, The New York Times described the book as "the leading text in its field." Bates received the Smith College Medal from her alma mater in 1980. Her second book, Bargaining for Life: A Social History of Tuberculosis, 1876-1938, won the Lavinia L. Dock Award from the American Association for the History of Nursing in 1993.

=== Later life ===
Bates died of Alzheimer's disease in Bryn Mawr, Pennsylvania, in 2002. Dr. Bates was survived by longtime companion Dr. Joan Lynaugh. Lynaugh is the co-founder and director emerita of the Barbara Bates Center for the Study of the History of Nursing, a research center at the University of Pennsylvania School of Nursing.

== Works ==
=== Books ===
- Bates, Barbara (1974). A Guide to Physical Examination and History Taking. J. B. Lippincott Company.
- Bates, Barbara (1992). Bargaining for Life: A Social History of Tuberculosis, 1876-1938. University of Pennsylvania Press. ISBN 9780812231205.

=== Articles ===
- Bates, Barbara (1970). "Doctor and Nurse: Changing Roles and Relations". Supervisor Nurse. 1 (5): 32–4 passim. doi:10.1097/00006247-197010000-00004. PMID 5206339.
- Bates, Barbara (November 1974). "Twelve Paradoxes: A Message for Nurse Practitioners". Nursing Outlook. 22 (11): 686–689. PMID 4497093.
- Bates, B (1975). "Physician and Nurse Practitioner: Conflict and Reward". Annals of Internal Medicine. 82 (5): 702–706. doi:10.7326/0003-4819-82-5-702. PMID 1137265.

== See also ==
- List of physicians
