= Barbara Harris (voice casting director) =

American voice casting director

Barbara Harris is an American voice casting director.

== The Looping Group ==
Harris is a voice casting director for motion pictures and television. Her credits include some of the top grossing films of all time, including Black Panther, Jurassic Park, Titanic, The Lion King, Indiana Jones and the Kingdom of the Crystal Skull, The Dark Knight, The Dark Knight Rises, Mission: Impossible – Ghost Protocol, Pirates of the Caribbean: Dead Man's Chest, Pirates of the Caribbean: On Stranger Tides, The Fate of the Furious, The Matrix Reloaded, The Twilight Saga: Eclipse, Transformers: Age of Extinction, Interstellar, Guardians of the Galaxy, and others.

She founded the voice casting company, The Looping Group. She and her company were mentioned in film critic, Roger Ebert's book, Questions for the Movie Answer Man. They were also mentioned in Kate McClanaghan's book, The Sound Advice Encyclopedia of Voice-Over & the Business of Being A Working Talent.
