= Jean Lefebvre (merchant) =

French merchant in Quebec City

Jean Lefebvre (1714–1760) was a French merchant in Quebec City. He came to Quebec City in 1732 to be the assistant of François Havy, at the trading company Dugard et Cie. Havy and LeFebvre formed a partnership and two became highly successful merchants in their own right. Lefebvre and Havy's business grew steadily, as they personally handled cargos and eventually came to own a small ship of their own, the Parfaite Union.

They experienced a setback when they invested in a sealing station in Labrador with Louis Bazil and Louis Fornel, and retained their interest in it until the 1745 capture of Louisbourg by Anglo-Americans cut them off from it. They lost about a third of their original 100,000 livre investment.

In 1756, during the Seven Years' War, Havy returned to France to oversee the transfer of as much of the business as possible there and Lefebvre joined with another cousin, François Levesque, as a partner to conclude what business remained. When the British captured Quebec in 1759 much of their assets in New France—in mortgages, Canadian paper money, and bills of exachange—were declared worthless by the new government. Leveque carried on as a merchant in British Canada for some time.

In 1760 he finally set to return to France, but died in an accident at sea aboard the Trident.
