= Barbara Harnack =

American sculptor (born 1957)

Barbara Harnack (born October 9, 1957) is a ceramic and mixed media sculpture artist. In 2016, she began expanding her career in painting. She has also co-authored a Children's book with husband and sculptor/ writer Michael Lancaster.

== Biography ==
Born in New York City, Harnack was adopted by Phyllis Harnack and grew up in Hastings on Hudson, NY. She studied at The Art Students League, NY and The Hudson River Museum, and RSDI during her early years. After high School she attended California College of Art, Philadelphia College of Art, State University of NY, and graduated with a certificate arts completion from Parsons School of Design in 1980. She also studied with Betty Warren at the Malden Bridge School of Art, where she met her future husband Michael Lancaster. Harnack and Lancaster founded The Malden Bridge Pottery in 1980. She began her work in clay during this time and although the couple made functional ceramics she began exploring mixed media on clay and making abstract figurative sculptures

== Contributions in Ceramic Art and the Drive to Support Artists ==
Barbara Harnack has made numerous contributions in the arts especially in ceramic arts. In 2006 she and her husband created the Harnack/ Lancaster Award for excellence and innovation in the Ceramic Arts awarded by New Mexico Potters and Clay Artists. Her interest in elevating and contributing to artists began in the 1980s when she and her husband began creating awards for artists in exhibits at their Woods Gallery, including exhibits such as "Art Wear for the Home and Body," which expressed the artist's role in interior design. Her desire to support artists was best expressed in the collaborative effort to create The Malden Bridge Arts Center which housed her gallery and studio may have been best addressed when she collaborated with George Ricky and created the invitational show "Six Sculptors," which showcased Rickey and artists and fellows in his foundation. In 1983 Harnack and her husband, along with interested community members established "The Malden Bridge Playhouse Society" to honor the former renowned summer stock theater where their gallery resided, and to bring performing arts back to the same venue. The former theater was a starting point for notable actors such as Barbra Streisand.

== Publications ==
- "Couples In Clay," Ceramics Monthly 2011
- "Barbara Harnack's Archetypal Tribe," Ceramics Monthly, March 2007
- "House on a High Desert Plain," American Style, #56 Summer 2007
