= Bärbel Beuermann =

German politician

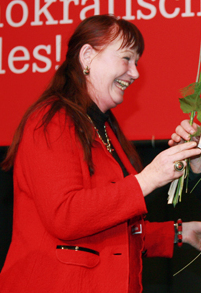
- Beuermann in 2012

Leader of The Left in the Landtag of North Rhine-Westphalia
- In office 11 May 2010 – 31 May 2012
- Preceded by: Position established
- Succeeded by: Position abolished

Member of the Landtag of North Rhine-Westphalia
- In office 9 June 2010 – 31 May 2012
- Constituency: The Left List

Personal details
- Born: 16 October 1955 (age 71) Herne-Holthausen, North Rhine-Westphalia, Germany
- Occupation: Politician

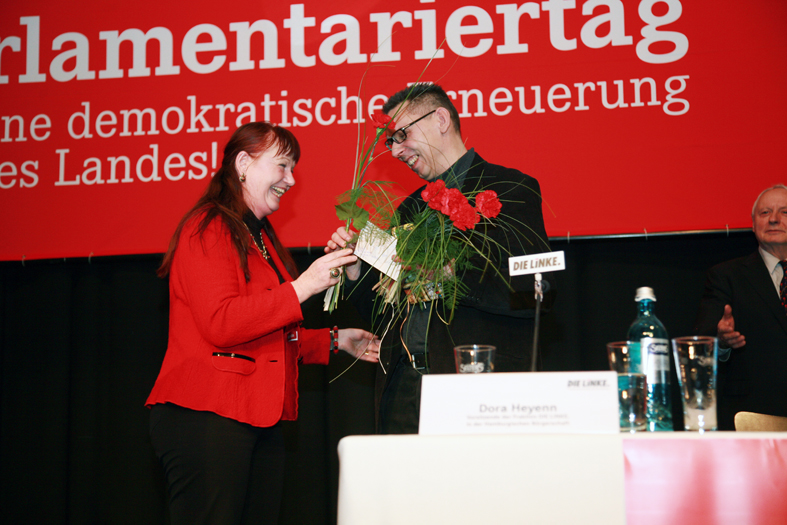
Beuermann and Gernot Klemm, 2012

Bärbel Beuermann (born 16 September 1955) is a German politician (The Left, now SPD), and was a member of the Landtag of North Rhine-Westphalia as a list MP since the state election held on 9 May 2010. She is the joint leader of the party in the Landtag, and is also a member of The Left's national party executive. After the election of 2012 in North Rhine-Westphalia she retired from the Landtag of North Rhine-Westphalia.

== Biography ==
Beuermann was born in Herne-Holthausen, North Rhine-Westphalia, Germany on 16 September 1955.

She completed high school in 1972, then from 1973 until 1976 attended a technical college in Dortmund from 1973 until 1976, graduating in nutrition science. She then taught in a vocational school in Wattenscheid. Her students were in many cases young people still of school age but registered as unemployed and with no prior training.

In 1986, she became a teacher at a comprehensive school in Herne-Wanne, while also working at an external technical school.

In 1994, she moved to the special school for the mentally and physically disabled in Wanne-Eickel, initially working as a subject teacher but then also focusing on a composite program for emotional and social development. She was elected as a representative by the staff in 2000, and is a member of the Education and Science Workers’ Union

== Politics ==
Since the mid-1980s, Beuermann engaged in the peace movement, and in 1999 she actively opposed the war in Kosovo, and through this, joined the Party of Democratic Socialism (PDS). On 12 September 1999, she was elected to the Herne city council, and from 2000 until 2003 was the party's spokeswoman. From 2004 until 2009 she represented Herne in the regional parliament of Arnsberg.

In 2004, she was elected to the party's executive, specialising in education, and in 2007, she was part of the steering committee managing the merger of the PDS and the WASG to form The Left Party (Die Linke).

On 21 November 2009, a national meeting of representatives in Mülheim an der Ruhr elected Beuermann (with 84% of the 203 delegates' votes) as their top list candidate for the upcoming state election in North Rhine-Westphalia. She also nominated as the constituency candidate for electoral district 110 (Herne I).

At the election, she obtained 8.52% of the vote in Herne I — third overall, and an improvement of 3.34% on the combined PDS-WASG vote in the 2005 election. The good showing of The Left under Beuermann's leadership throughout the state resulted in the party winning 11 list seats in the Landtag. The elected MPs subsequently elected Beuermann and Wolfgang Zimmermann to leadership roles.
