= Barbara ter Kuile =

American politician (1929–2004)

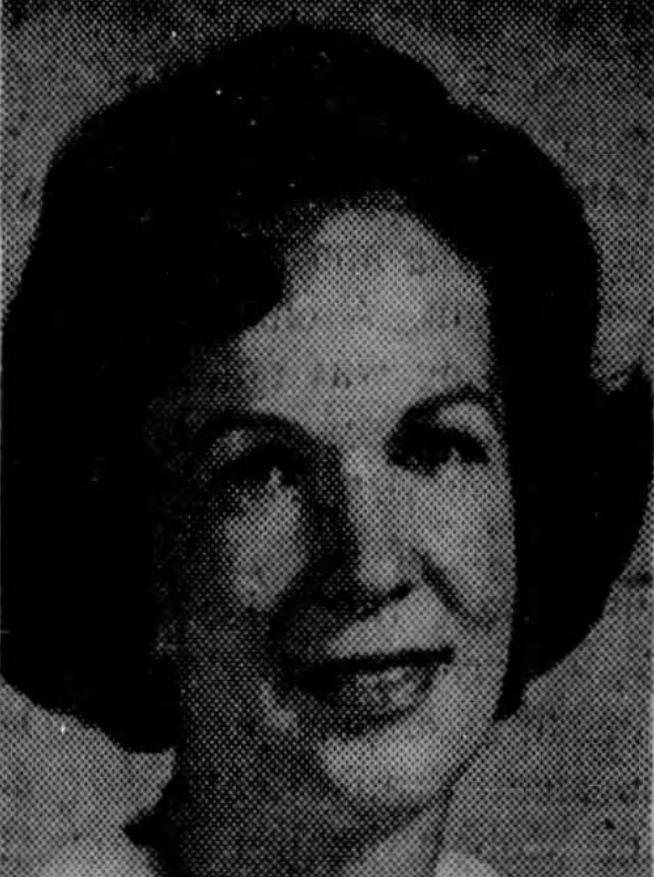

Member of the Connecticut House of Representatives from the 172nd district
- In office 1967–1971
- Preceded by: Seat created
- Succeeded by: Harold G. Harlow

Personal details
- Born: February 18, 1929 Brooklyn, New York, U.S.
- Died: November 5, 2004 (aged 75) Southampton, New York, U.S.
- Party: Republican
- Spouse: Curtis Rowe ter Kuile
- Children: 3

Barbara J. ter Kuile (February 18, 1929 – November 5, 2004) was an American politician who served in the Connecticut House of Representatives from 1967 to 1971, representing the 172nd district as a Republican.

== Personal life ==
Ter Kuile was born on February 18, 1929, in Brooklyn, New York. She was married to Curtis Rowe ter Kuile, with whom she moved to Litchfield, Connecticut, and had three children.

Ter Kuile died on November 5, 2004, in Southampton, New York. She was 75.

== Political career ==
Ter Kuile was elected to the Connecticut House of Representatives in 1966, and she served two terms representing the newly created 172nd district as a Republican. She did not run for reelection in 1970 and was succeeded by fellow Republican Harold G. Harlow. Following her service in the House of Representatives, ter Kuile remained involved with the Connecticut Republican Party and served on the Republican State Central Committee.
