= Marie-Anne Barbel =

French-Canadian businesswoman (1704–1793)

Marie-Anne Barbel (26 August 1704 – 16 November 1793) was a French-Canadian businesswoman who lived in New France. She is notable for leading several successful business enterprises after the death of her husband, Louis Fornel.

== Early life ==
Marie-Anne Barbel was born to Jacques Barbell and Marie-Anne Le Picard on 26 August 1704, at the French settlement of Quebec. Her father, Jacques, began as a garrison seargent and eventually was able to work his way into political office. By 1723, Jacques Barbel was the judge sénéchal of Lauson, a royal notary in Quebec, the judge bailiff of the Beaupre seigneurie, and greffier de l'Officialité. The Barbel family was well known amongst the political elite in New France.

== Marriage ==
Marie-Anne Barbel married Jean-Louis Fornel, son of a wealthy merchant family, in December 1723. Both came from very important families in New France and this was reflected in the list of guests invited at the marriage. Guests such as the governor le marquis de Vaudreuil and intendant Michel Bégon attended the wedding.

They had 13 children, seven of whom survived beyond infancy, and five of which, four girls and one boy, reached the age of 18. Fornel and his father were both designated bourgeoisie of Quebec. Marie's brother-in-law, Joachim Fornel, was a parish priest as well as Canon of the Quebec Cathedral Chapter. During the life of her husband, the care of her children would have likely consumed most of her time while Fornel was busy taking care of the different business ventures One of the principal businesses of the family was a retail store located in Place Royal in Quebec. In fact, most of Fornel's business ventures between 1723 and 1737 is centered around retail. However, beginning in 1737, Fornel began exploring the possibility of expanding into the fur industry with Louis Bazil and Francois Havy. In 1743, Fornel's involvement in the fur industry gave him less time to take care of his retail business in Quebec. Therefore, on May 14, 1743, Fornel granted Barbel full power of attorney. This allowed her to manage the business affairs of Fornel while he was on business away at Labrador, and that Barbel had all the legal and financial rights that Fornel would have had to conduct business. At this point, Fornel focused almost exclusively on exploring different posts in Labrador.

=== Death of husband ===
Fornel fell ill and died on 30 May 1745.

Barbel was granted control of roughly half of Fornel's property as well as control of his business ventures. This division of property was dictated under the Custom of Paris which served as the legal framework for most of France's overseas colonies beginning in 1454. As the Custom dictated, Barbel was entitled to one half of the couple's Communaute des biens (community of property), the rest going to child heirs.

=== Custom of Paris ===
Under the Custom of Paris, widow's have all the legal rights of the deceased husband. Therefore, there are no restrictions on her if she wishes to pursue business ventures inherited from her husband. When couples get married under the custom of Paris, the husband normally had most of the managerial power. However, if the husband dies, the rights of the community belong to the widow and the children if they decide not to dissolve it. However, once they chose to dissolve the community, half goes to the widow and the other half goes to the children. Most importantly for Barbel, though, is that once the husband dies, the widow receives authority of the community, la puissance paternelle, to manage all the belongings. The widow acquires "judicial authority, the right to make contracts and go to court". In effect, this means that widows have equal status as men and this allowed several women to pursue successful business careers.

=== Business ventures ===
After the death of her husband, Barbel took her inheritance from her husband and was able to expand her interests. Initially, from 1745 to 1748, Barbel took care of the retail store in Place Royal. However, in 1749, Barbel received the lease on a fur trade post in Tadoussac. This lease lasted from 1749 to 1755 and the cost was 7,000 livres per year. Although the exact amount of the trade at this post is not known, the value of the inventory went from 44,686 livres in 1750 to 71,069 livres in 1755. This suggests a significant increase in business during her tenure. By 1750, Barbel had over 40 men working for her. She also expanded her posts to four other locations in this time, at Ile Jeremie, Riviere Moisie, Chicoutimi, and Malbaie.

Barbel also had significant real estate holdings, much of it inherited from her husband after his death. In 1746, she purchased land in Charlesbourg and in 1747, she purchased land in the seigneurie of Neuville. Also, between 1747 and 1754, she purchased the buildings surrounding her shop in Place Royal.

Barbel was involved in a legal battle with the Jesuits between 1745 and 1756 concerning land she inherited from her husband. This piece of land was located in seigneurie de Notre-Dame-des-Anges, and part of the land was eaten up the river Saint-Charles. Barbel requested that the Jesuits expand her land by nineteen arpents, the amount taken by the river, or that they pay her 6,000 livres in damages. The Jesuits refused either option and went to court. The case lasted several years.

Not all of Barbel's business ventures, however, were successful. An important business venture that did not succeed was her pottery business. She began this business in 1746. However, she would face considerable problems with workers and production was inconsistent. Therefore, in 1752, she abandoned this business.

== British rule ==
At the end of the Seven Years' War, New France became a part of the British empire. This event, and the war preceding it, damaged Barbel's commercial career. Much of her real estate in Quebec was damaged from the bombing, including her store in Place Royal. After years of stalling, in 1765, she decided to dissolve her community of property. This meant that her children would finally receive their inheritance from the deceased father. When Fornel initially died, Barbel decided not to dissolve the community of property because some of her children were still young.

== Final years ==
After years of working, Barbel was effectively in retirement from 1777 to 1793. During this period, her son Jean-Louis died in 1784. Also, her daughter died in 1793. On 16 November 1793, Barbel died at the age of 90.

== Legacy ==
Barbel's life in business gave a close look at a woman functioning in the merchant class. An inventory of Barbel's property in 1770 showed she lived a relatively bourgeois life and maintained several properties in settlement at Quebec. Despite serious losses during the Seven Years' War, she was able to divide a solid estate amongst the heirs on her retirement in 1777. According to scholar Lilianne Plamondon, Barbel's life is an example of the diverse kinds of women that existed in New France. In the history of New France, much attention is given to women such as Marguerite Bourgeoys, Marie de l'Incarnation, and Jeanne Mance. These were all religious figures who influenced public life. However, there were numerous important women who took up important roles in the economic life of New France. Barbel was not an exception, and many women had prominent business roles.
