= Barbara Hochstein =

New Zealand radiologist

Barbara Hochstein MNZM
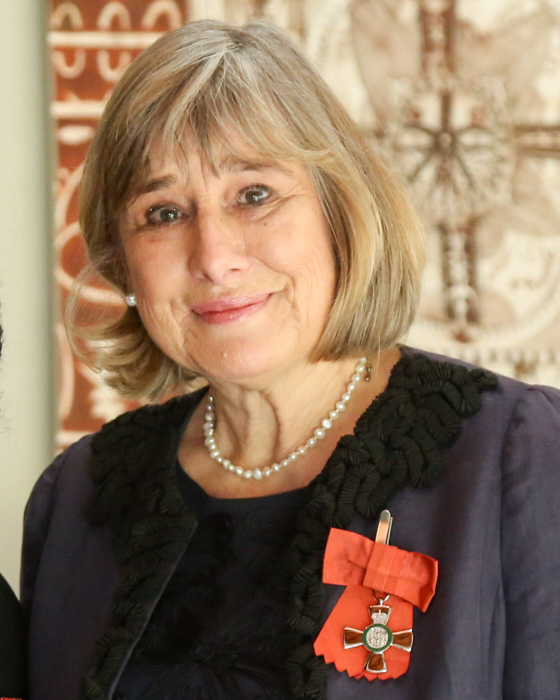
- Born: Germany
- Awards: Member of the New Zealand Order of Merit

Academic background
- Education: University of Otago

Barbara Eva Hochstein MNZM is a German–New Zealand radiologist, and radiology educator. She is one of New Zealand's longest-serving radiologists, and has led the establishment of mobile breastscreening services, the use of pregnancy scans for family violence detection, and the provision of out-of-hours radiology advice across Australia and New Zealand. In 2024 Hochstein was appointed a Member of the New Zealand Order of Merit for services to radiology and education.

== Early life and education ==
Hochstein is originally German, and arrived in New Zealand with her parents at the age of seven. She became a New Zealand citizen fifty years later, having waited until dual citizenship was permitted. Hochstein completed her medical degree at the University of Otago in 1982.

== Career ==
Hochstein is based in Rotorua, and is one of New Zealand's longest-serving radiologists. She has been a Fellow of the Royal Australian and New Zealand College of Radiologists since 1990, and is a Fellowship Examiner. She has been a consultant radiologist at Rotorua Hospital since 1999. Between 1999 and 2016 Hochstein was clinical director of the Bay of Plenty Breastscreen Aotearoa service, and has previously been the medical advisor to the Breast Cancer Foundation.

Hochstein established initiatives to improve communication between radiologists and surgeons, pathologists, oncologists, chemotherapy nurses, and practitioners, encouraging the use of a common language. She set up mobile breast screening services for rural areas, and convened a conference on the use of pregnancy ultrasounds for family violence detection.

Hochstein founded the Aratika Cancer Trust in 2011, of which she was chair until 2019, and of which she is now patron and medical advisor. The trust promotes integrative care for cancer patients, which is the use of evidence-based complementary therapies alongside medical treatment. The trust also runs workshops, support programmes and retreats for patients and their families.

Hochstein is a Clinical Senior Lecturer in Radiology at the University of Auckland, and has received fifteen 'best guest lecturer' awards. In 2024 she took a temporary position based in London in order to provide out-of-hours radiology services to hospitals in New Zealand and Australia.

== Honours and awards ==
In the 2024 New Year Honours Hochstein was appointed a Member of the New Zealand Order of Merit for services to radiology and education.
