= Barbara Waxman Fiduccia =

American disability activist, author, and educator

- Born: April 1, 1955
- Died: April 24, 2001 (aged 46)
- Education: California State University
- Known for: Disability rights activism, reproductive rights activism
- Spouse: Dan Fiduccia (married 1996)

Barbara Faye Waxman Fiduccia (April 1, 1955 – April 24, 2001) was an American disability activist, author, and educator.

Waxman Fiduccia was born with spinal muscular atrophy and used an external ventilation system until she had a tracheostomy in 2000.

== Biography ==
She studied at California State University, graduating in 1978 with a degree in psychology, and then went on to work for Planned Parenthood and the Los Angeles Regional Family Planning Council.

She published Disability Feminism: A Manifesto and the second Multiplying Choices: Improving Access to Reproductive Health Services for Women with Disabilities both spoke to her commitment to providing sexual and reproductive healthcare to women with disabilities. She also published articles and papers relating to disabilities and reproductive rights.

She was married to Dan Fiduccia in 1996. Fiduccia also used a wheelchair as a result of childhood cancer. They fought the Social security Administration for their right to be married without losing the Medicaid and Medicare benefits she needed to stay alive.

== Death and legacy ==
Eighteen days after Fiduccia died of cancer in 2001, Waxman Fiduccia died of a ventilator malfunction. The Center for Women Policy Studies, where she had been a senior associate, sponsored an online series of academic papers in memory of Waxman Fiduccia between 2011 and 2012.
