= Barbara Biggie =

American politician

Member of New Hampshire House of Representatives for Hillsborough 23
- In office 2014–2018

Personal details
- Party: Republican

Barbara Biggie is an American politician. She was a member of the New Hampshire House of Representatives and represented Hillsborough's 23rd district.
