= Barbara Buhler Lynes =

American art historian (born 1942)

Barbara Buhler Lynes (born 1942) is an art historian, curator, professor, and preeminent scholar on the art and life of Georgia O'Keeffe. She retired on February 14, 2020 from her position as the Sunny Kaufman Senior Curator at the NSU Museum of Art in Fort Lauderdale, Florida to continue her scholarly work on O'Keeffe and American modernism. From 1999 to 2012, she served as the founding curator of the Georgia O'Keeffe Museum in Santa Fe, New Mexico, where she curated or oversaw more than thirty exhibitions of works by O'Keeffe and her contemporaries. Lynes was also the Founding Emily Fisher Landau Director of the Georgia O'Keeffe Museum Research Center from 2001 to 2012. Prior to her work at the Georgia O'Keeffe Museum, Lynes served as an independent contractor to the National Gallery of Art in Washington, D.C. from 1992 to 1999 and has taught art history at Vanderbilt University, Dartmouth College, Montgomery College, and the Maryland Institute College of Art (MICA).

Lynes holds a PhD in French Literature from the University of California, Riverside and a PhD in Art History from Indiana University Bloomington. She has written books, book chapters, and essays on O'Keeffe and other American modernists, including the award-winning two volume Georgia O'Keeffe: Catalogue Raisonné (1999) that documents and authenticates O'Keeffe's extensive oeuvre.

== Books ==
- Exhibiting O'Keeffe: The Making of an American Modernist: Museum of Modern Art 1946, 2023
- O'Keeffe and Moore, 2023 ISBN 978-0937108635
- O'Keeffe: A Life Well Lived, 2020 ISBN 978-0-8263-6200-1
- Wiliiam J. Glackens and Pierre-Auguste Renoir: Affinities and Distinctions, 2018 ISBN 978-88-572-3950-7
- Georgia O'Keeffe: Abstracting Nature, 2018 ISBN 978-1-7324480-0-1
- Georgia O'Keeffe, un phénomène américain: questions d'identité, 2015 ISBN 978-2-7572-1039-0
- Photography Changes Our Public Image, 2012 ISBN 978-1-59711-199-7
- Georgia O'Keeffe and Her Houses: Ghost Ranch and Abiquiu, 2012 ISBN 978-1-4197-0394-2
- Georgia O'Keeffe in New Mexico: Architecture, Katsinam, and the Land, 2012 ISBN 978-0-89013-547-1
- Georgia O'Keeffe, 2011 ISBN 978-88-572-1232-6
- Shared Intelligence: American Painting and The Photograph, 2011 ISBN 0-520-26906-3
- Georgia O'Keeffe: Abstraction, 2009 ISBN 978-0-300-14817-6
- Georgia O'Keeffe, 2009 Encyclopedia Britannica, online publication
- Susan Rothenberg: Moving in Place, 2009 ISBN 3-7913-4346-7
- Georgia O'Keeffe and the Camera: The Art of Identity, 2008 ISBN 978-0-916857-48-6
- Georgia O'Keeffe and Ansel Adams: Subjects of Self, 2008 ISBN 0-316-11832-X
- Georgia O'Keeffe and Marsden Hartley in New Mexico, 2008 ISBN 978-0-300-12149-0
- The 1980s: A Virtual Discussion, 2007 ISBN 978-1-890761-09-7
- Georgia O'Keeffe Museum Collections, 2007 ISBN 978-0-8109-0957-1
- Georgia O'Keeffe: Identity and Place, 2007 ISBN 978-0-943411-49-1
- Introduction and Overview: Visiting Georgia O'Keeffe, 2006
- Moments in Modernism—Georgia O'Keeffe and Andy Warhol: Flowers of Distinction, 2005 ISBN 0-9673190-7-2
- Museums of Tomorrow: A Virtual Discussion, 2004 ISBN 1-890761-07-9
- Georgia O'Keeffe and New Mexico : A Sense of Place, 2004 ISBN 0-691-11659-8
- Maria Chabot—Georgia O'Keeffe: Correspondence 1941–1949, 2003 ISBN 0-8263-2993-4
- Georgia O'Keeffe Museum: Highlights of the Collection, 2003 ISBN 0-8109-9153-5
- Postmodernism: A Virtual Discussion, ISBN 1-890761-05-2
- Georgia O'Keeffe and the Calla Lily in American Art, 1860-1940, 2002 ISBN 0-300-09738-7
- Georgia O'Keeffe, 1916 and 1917: My Own Tune, 2001 ISBN 0-89468-283-0
- O'Keeffe's O'Keeffes: The Artist's Collection, 2001 ISBN 0-500-09299-0
- O'Keeffe on Paper, 2000 ISBN 0-89468-275-X
- Modern Art in America: Alfred Stiegtliz etc., 2000 ISBN 0-89468-283--0
- Georgia O'Keeffe: Catalogue Raisonné, 1999 ISBN 0-300-08176-6
- Georgia O'Keeffe, 1993 ISBN 0-8478-1650-8
- The Language of Criticism: Its Effect on Art of Georgia O'Keeffe, 1992 ISBN 0-201-57070-X
- O'Keeffe and Feminism: A Problem of Position, 1992 ISBN 0-06430207-5
- O'Keeffe, Stieglitz and the Critics, 1916–1929, 1989 ISBN 0-226-49824-7
