= Barbara Oddone =

Italian tennis player

- Country (sports): Italy
- Born: 5 April 1970 (age 55)

Singles
- Career record: 3/1

Doubles
- Career record: 0/1
Medal record
Women's Tennis
Representing Italy
Event / 1st / 2nd / 3rd; Deaflympics / 15 / 2 / 1
Deaflympics
Gold medal – first place	Christchurch 1989	singles
Gold medal – first place	Christchurch 1989	doubles
Gold medal – first place	Christchurch 1989	mixed doubles...
Gold medal – first place	Sofia 1993	singles
Gold medal – first place	Sofia 1993	mixed doubles
Gold medal – first place	Copenhagen 1997	singles
Gold medal – first place	Copenhagen 1997	doubles
Gold medal – first place	Copenhagen 1997	mixed doubles
Gold medal – first place	Rome 2001	singles
Gold medal – first place	Rome 2001	doubles
Gold medal – first place	Rome 2001	mixed doubles
Gold medal – first place	Melbourne 2005	singles
Gold medal – first place	Melbourne 2005	doubles
Gold medal – first place	Melbourne 2005	mixed doubles
Gold medal – first place	Taipei 2009	singles
Silver medal – second place	Sofia 1993	doubles
Silver medal – second place	Taipei 2009	mixed doubles
Bronze medal – third place	Taipei 2009	doubles

Barbara Oddone (born 5 April 1970) is a former Italian deaf female tennis player. She has represented Italy at the Deaflympics from 1989 to 2013. Oddone has won a total of 18 medals at the Deaflympics, which enlightens the career best performance by any Italian player at the Deaflympic history.

She is also regarded as one of the greatest tennis players to have competed at the Deaflympics with a record haul of 18 medals including 15 gold medals.

Oddone was awarded the Deaf Sportswoman of the Year in 1997 by the ICSD after winning gold medals in the women's singles, doubles and mixed doubles at the 1997 Summer Deaflympics. She was also nominated for the Deaf Sportswoman of the Year award in 1996, 2001 and in 2009.
