= Barbara Schwartz =

Barbara Schwartz is the name of:

- Barbara Schwartz (artist) (1949–2006), American abstract artist and art teacher
- Barbara Schwartz (tennis) (born 1979), Austrian former tennis player
