= Barbara Figueroa =

American chef

- Born: New York City, New York
- Education: New York City Community College
- Culinary career
- Cooking style: American/Mediterranean cuisine
- Previous restaurant(s): Hunt Club; B. Figueroa
- Award(s) won: James Beard Foundation Award Best Northwest Chef 1992

Barbara Figueroa is an American chef who was best known for her work at the Hunt Club, and her restaurant B. Figueroa. She won the James Beard Foundation Award for Best Northwest Chef in 1992.

== Career ==
Barbara Figueroa grew up in New York City, and decided to become a chef once she was in her 20s following the influence of her grandmother. As a child, Figueroa spent summers with her grandmother in Maine, and has memories of family cooking. Figueroa trained as a chef at the New York City Community College, and then moved to Los Angeles where she worked for Wolfgang Puck at his restaurant Spago.

Figueroa made her name as a chef while working as head chef at the Hunt Club within the Sorrento Hotel in Seattle, taking over from David Pisegna. She worked there between 1987 and 1992, when she won the James Beard Foundation Award for Best Northwest Chef. After leaving there, she opened the restaurant B. Figueroa and then became director of food and beverage at the Warwick Hotel. When she left the Warwick in 2002, following a change of direction for the restaurant, she made a career change. Figueroa returned to college and went on to study for a Doctor of Psychology at the University of Kansas. She graduated in 2012, and undertook her postdoctoral residency in Kansas City, Missouri, at the Center for Behavioral Medicine.
