= Barbara Holm =

American politician

Member of the Washington House of Representatives from the 35th district
- In office 1993–1995

Member of the Washington House of Representatives from the 20th district
- In office 1987–1989

Personal details
- Born: 1948 (age 77–78) Washington
- Party: Democratic
- Education: University of Washington

Barbara J. Holm (born 1948) was an American politician. She is a Democrat, and represented District 20 in the Washington House of Representatives which included parts of Lewis, Pierce and Thurston counties, from 1987 to 1989. In 1993 she was elected in District 35 representing Mason County and parts of Grays Harbor, Kitsap and Thurston counties.
