= Barbara Young =

Barbara Young may refer to:

- Barbara Young, Baroness Young of Old Scone (born 1948), Labour member of the British House of Lords
- Barbara Young (actress) (1931–2023), British actress
- Barbara Young (poet) (1878–1961), American art and literary critic, and poet
- Barbara Arrowsmith Young (born 1951), creator of the Arrowsmith Program
- Barbara G. Young, TSR roleplaying game magazine editor
- Barbara M. Young, judge on the Supreme Court of British Columbia
- Barbara N. Young, American art librarian and curator
- Barbara Young (Neighbours), fictional character on Australian soap opera Neighbours
