= Louis Fornel =

French explorer (1698–1745)

Louis Fornel (August 20, 1698 – May 30, 1745) was a Habitant merchant, explorer, and seigneur in New France. Involved in maritime trade and both born and married into prominent Quebec families, Louis Fornel was among the partners Louis Bazil convinced to invest in his ill-fated Labrador sealing station.

Determined to claim a sealing concession of his own, Fornel explored Hamilton Inlet (until then known as Baie des Esquimaux and named Baie Saint-Louis) in Labrador aboard the Expérience, which he owned with François Havy and Jean Lafebvre. According to his record of the journey, Fornel devised an experiment to prove that the Inuit did not, as was commonly supposed, live on raw meat and salt water. Fornel's claim to the Bay was never formally recognised until after his death, when it was granted to his widow, Marie-Anne Barbel, who carried on the family business.

Some time in the 1740s, Fornel bought a parcel of land adjacent to Notre-Dame-des-Anges – and perhaps more importantly, the status that came with the title of seigneur—which he named Bourg-Louis.
