= Barbara Moore =

Barbara Moore may refer to:

- Barbara Moore (ambassador) (1952–2010), United States ambassador to Nicaragua
- Barbara Moore (arts executive), Australian arts executive, CEO of Biennale of Sydney since 2019
- Barbara Moore (athlete) (born 1957), New Zealand long-distance runner
- Barbara Moore (composer) (1932–2021), British composer, arranger and vocalist for film, television and commercials
- Barbara Moore (model) (born 1968), Playboy magazine's Playmate for December 1992
- Barbara Moore (vegetarian activist) (1903–1977), Russian-born health enthusiast and long-distance walker
- Barbara Mbitjana Moore (born 1964), Australian artist
