= Narcissus 'Grand Soleil d'Or' =

Daffodil cultivar

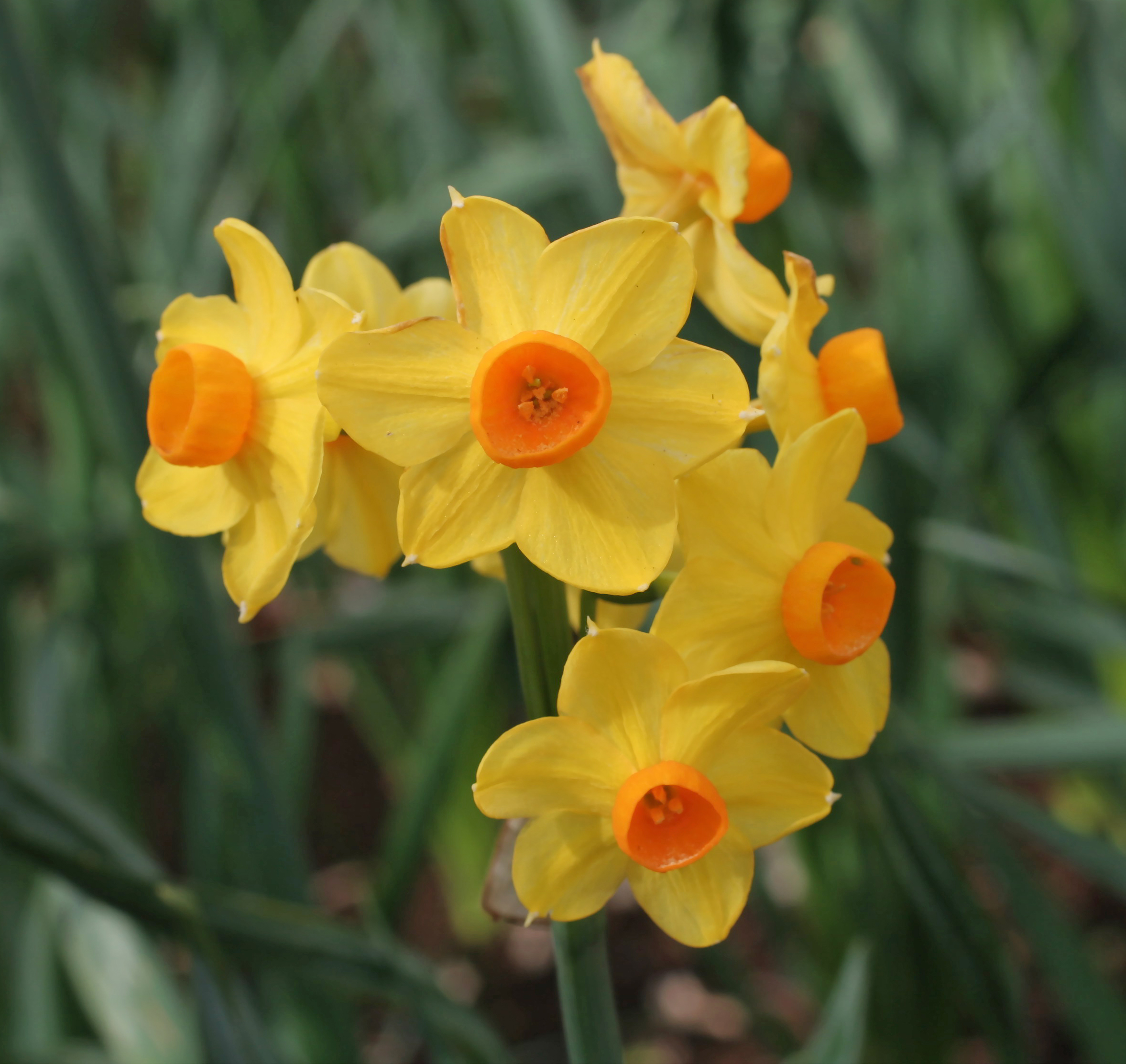
- Genus: Narcissus
- Species: Narcissus tazetta
- Cultivar group: Division 8
- Cultivar: 'Grand Soleil d'Or'
- Breeder: Unknown
- Origin: Unknown

Narcissus 'Grand Soleil d'Or' is a cultivar of daffodil. It is believed that the cultivar was derived from Narcissus tazetta.

== Description ==
Narcissus 'Grand Soleil d'Or' is a clump forming, bulbous perennial that can grow up to 45cm tall. Leaves are strap-shaped and greyish green in colour. A mature bulb will produce a singular stem, which hosts a cluster of scented flowers. Blooms consist of 10 to 20 small flowers, which possess golden petals and a short orange corona.

== History ==
The 'Grand Soleil d'Or' daffodils origin isn't certain, however it is believed it may be Dutch in origin. Records of the cultivars existence date back to before 1770. There is a legend on the Isles of Scilly that a Dutch merchant gifted Narcissi bulbs to the lady of Star Castle. She later discarded the bulbs mistaking them for foul tasting onions.

Cultivation of this cultivar has taken place on the Isles of Scilly as far back as the 1860s. The first Narcissus to be farmed for the cut flower trade and sold in London suburbs were predominantly ‘Grand Soleil d’Or' and ‘Scilly White’. During the 1950s up to 200 million narcissus were grown and hand picked on the Isle of Scilly every year. These daffodils would then be packed and distributed throughout the United Kingdom as cut flowers.
