= Barbara Joan March =

American criminal (born 1945)

- Born: October 10, 1945 (age 81)
- Status: Incarcerated
- Conviction: Mailing injurious articles
- Penalty: 15 years' imprisonment

Barbara Joan March (born October 10, 1945) is an American criminal from Connecticut who is imprisoned for 'Mailing Injurious Articles' to fourteen United States government officials.

In April 2005, she sent several food items, including baked goods and candy, to the fourteen officials. Each item was laced with a lethal dose of warfarin (rat poison). Each package included a typewritten note that threatened the recipient with being poisoned, and had the return address of people she had a grudge against, such as former co-workers and classmates.

The items were sent to the:

- Nine justices of the Supreme Court of the United States
- Director of the Federal Bureau of Investigation, Robert Mueller
- Deputy Director of the Federal Bureau of Investigation
- Chief of Naval Operations of the United States
- Chief of Staff of the United States Air Force
- Chief of Staff of the United States Army

An investigation by the Federal Bureau of Investigation resulted, led by Special Agent Monica M. Patton. After initial testing of evidence and investigation of the people named as the senders of the packages, a pattern emerged linking March to the items. March's home was searched, leading to the discovery of documents and sufficient evidence to lead to an arrest and charges.

At the time of her arrest on June 24, 2005, March was living in a rented room at a Bridgeport, Connecticut homeless shelter.

March had previously been convicted in 1985 of attempting to poison several relatives with wine.

On March 1, 2006, March pleaded guilty to 14 counts of mailing injurious articles. On October 11, 2006, she was sentenced to serve fifteen years, and is currently serving her time at FCI Danbury, with a projected release date of July 19, 2018.

March signed out of a halfway house in April 2018 and failed to return, she was arrested and pled guilty to escape charges and was sentenced to an additional five years in prison.
