= Barbara Traub =

American photographer

External videos
- "An Iconic Photo of Burning Man", Time

Barbara Traub is an American photographer, who was born and raised in Baltimore, Maryland. Several years after graduating from Johns Hopkins University, she went on an exchange program to an art school in Florence, Italy, for a semester with the intention of doing painting and drawing but at the last minute was handed a camera, thus establishing her future direction.

== Career ==
Her early work was influenced primarily by the street photography/decisive moment aesthetics of Robert Frank, Josef Koudelka, and Henri Cartier-Bresson. In 1987 she won first place in the Baltimore Sun Magazine photo contest and held her first exhibition. She traveled worldwide, particularly in Southeast Asia, making informal portraits of people in their surroundings. Soon thereafter, she was introduced to the art of Man Ray whose attention to surrealism, abstraction, and multimedia further influenced her style.

In 1994 Traub moved to San Francisco. That summer she went to Lake Tahoe to photograph the figure as landscape and heard of the Black Rock Desert and shortly afterward its Burning Man festival. In 1996 she worked on assignment for Wired magazine's cover story and again for Wired News in 2001 and 2006. She was chief photographer for HardWired's 1997 book Burning Man and curator of the Art of Burning Man exhibition at Photo SF 2004. Her book Desert to Dream: A Decade of Burning Man Photography, was published in 2006 to favorable reviews. It has been described as "A lovely book, beautifully shot, surreal and random and appropriately odd" and recommended for academic collections of photographic studies. In 2009, Time magazine declared the image on the book's cover to be an "Iconic Photo of Burning Man". A revised and expanded edition Desert to Dream: A Dozen Years of Burning Man Photography was released in 2011.

== Books ==
- Burning Man - HardWired, 1997. ISBN 1-888869-13-5.
- Desert to Dream: A Decade of Burning Man Photography - Immedium, 2006. ISBN 1-59702-003-6.
- Desert to Dream: A Dozen Years of Burning Man Photography - Immedium, 2011. ISBN 1-59702-026-5.

== Exhibitions ==
Traub's work has been shown in a number of solo and group exhibitions, including the following:

- 2015, All About the Light, Group exhibition, Robert Tat Gallery
- 2011, "Essence Of Luminescence", solo exhibition, Canessa Gallery, San Francisco
- 2011, "Every Reverie", solo exhibition, The McLoughlin Gallery in San Francisco
- 2001, "Light2: Images from the Photography Collections", Group exhibition, Albin O. Kuhn Library Gallery, UMBC, Baltimore, MD
- 1998, "Burning Mirror", solo exhibition, San Francisco Arts Commission
- 1987, first solo show, Hubble Space Telescope Science Institute
