= Barbra Riley =

American photographer

Barbra Riley (born 1949) is an American photographer. From 1978 to 2016 Riley was a professor of art at Texas A&M University, Corpus Christi.

Her work is included in the collection of the Museum of Fine Arts Houston, and the Dallas Museum of Art and the Harry Ransom Center at the University of Texas, Austin.
