= Barbara Frost =

British retired charity executive (born 1952)

Dame Barbara Mary Frost, DBE (born 1952) is a British retired charity executive. From 2005 to 2017, she was the chief executive officer (CEO) of WaterAid. She had previously been CEO of Action on Disability and Development, and had worked for ActionAid, Save the Children and Oxfam.

== Honours ==
In the 2017 Queen's Birthday Honours, Frost was appointed a Dame Commander of the Order of the British Empire (DBE) "for services to the provision of safe water, sanitation and hygiene in developing countries", and thereby granted the title dame.

The University of Bath awarded Frost an Honorary Doctorate of Education in December 2021.
