= Barbara Lisk =

American politician

Member of the Washington House of Representatives from the 15th district
- In office 1991–2003

Personal details
- Born: 1952 (age 73–74) Washington
- Party: Republican
- Education: Washington State University

Barbara Lisk (born 1952) was an American politician. She was a Republican, representing District 15 in the Washington House of Representatives which included the lower Yakima Valley, Klickitat County, and parts of Benton and Skamania counties, from 1991 to 2003.
