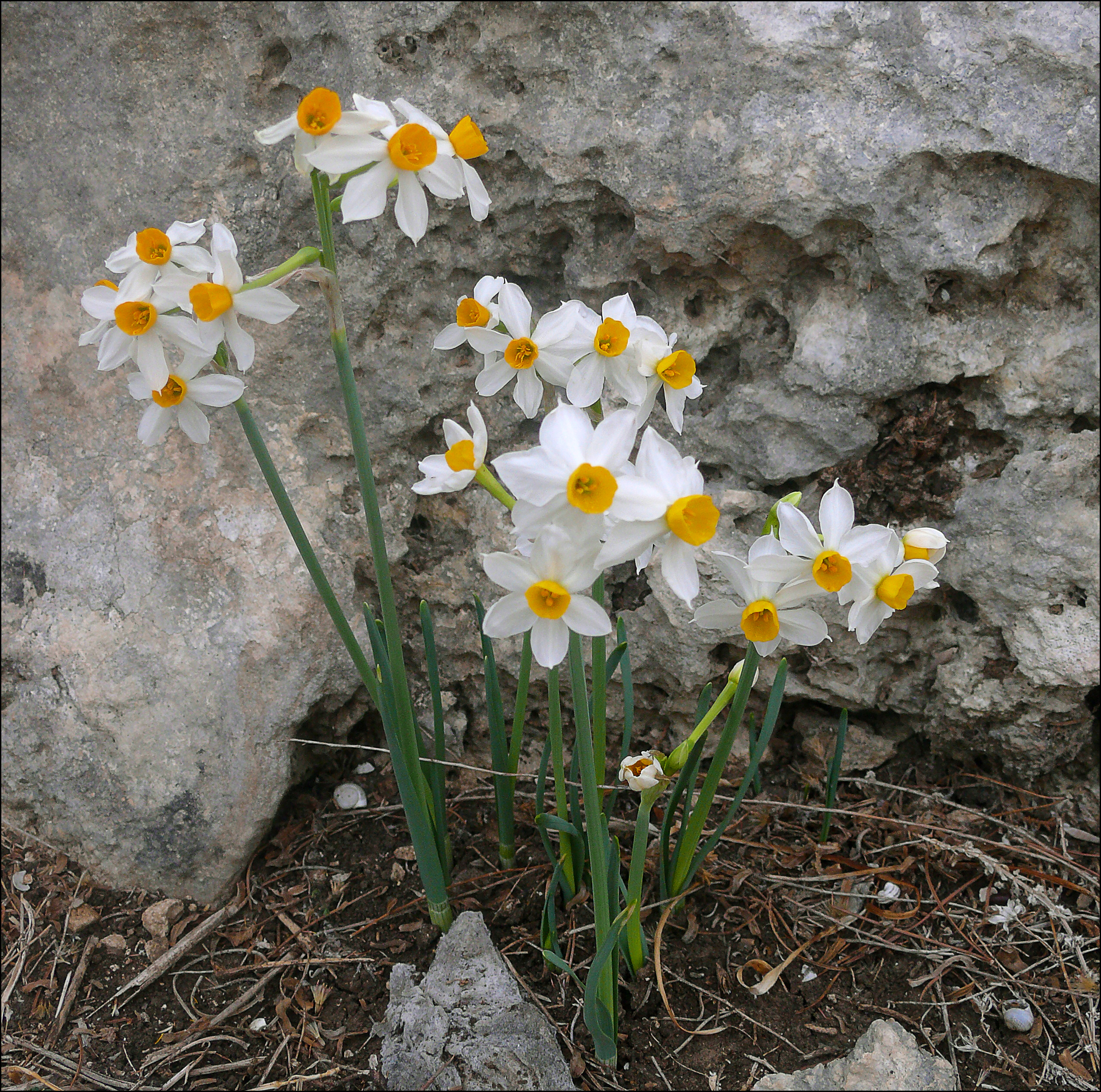
- In Israel

Scientific classification
- Kingdom: Plantae
- Clade: Tracheophytes
- Clade: Angiosperms
- Clade: Monocots
- Order: Asparagales
- Family: Amaryllidaceae
- Subfamily: Amaryllidoideae
- Genus: Narcissus
- Species: N. tazetta

Binomial name
- Narcissus tazetta L.

= Narcissus tazetta =

Species of daffodil

Narcissus tazetta (paperwhite, bunch-flowered narcissus, bunch-flowered daffodil, Chinese sacred lily, cream narcissus, joss flower, polyanthus narcissus) is a perennial ornamental plant that grows from a bulb. Cultivars of N. tazetta include 'Caniculatus', 'Grand Soleil d'Or' and 'Ziva', which are popularly used for forcing indoors, as is the form of N. tazetta known as Chinese Sacred Lily.

== Description ==
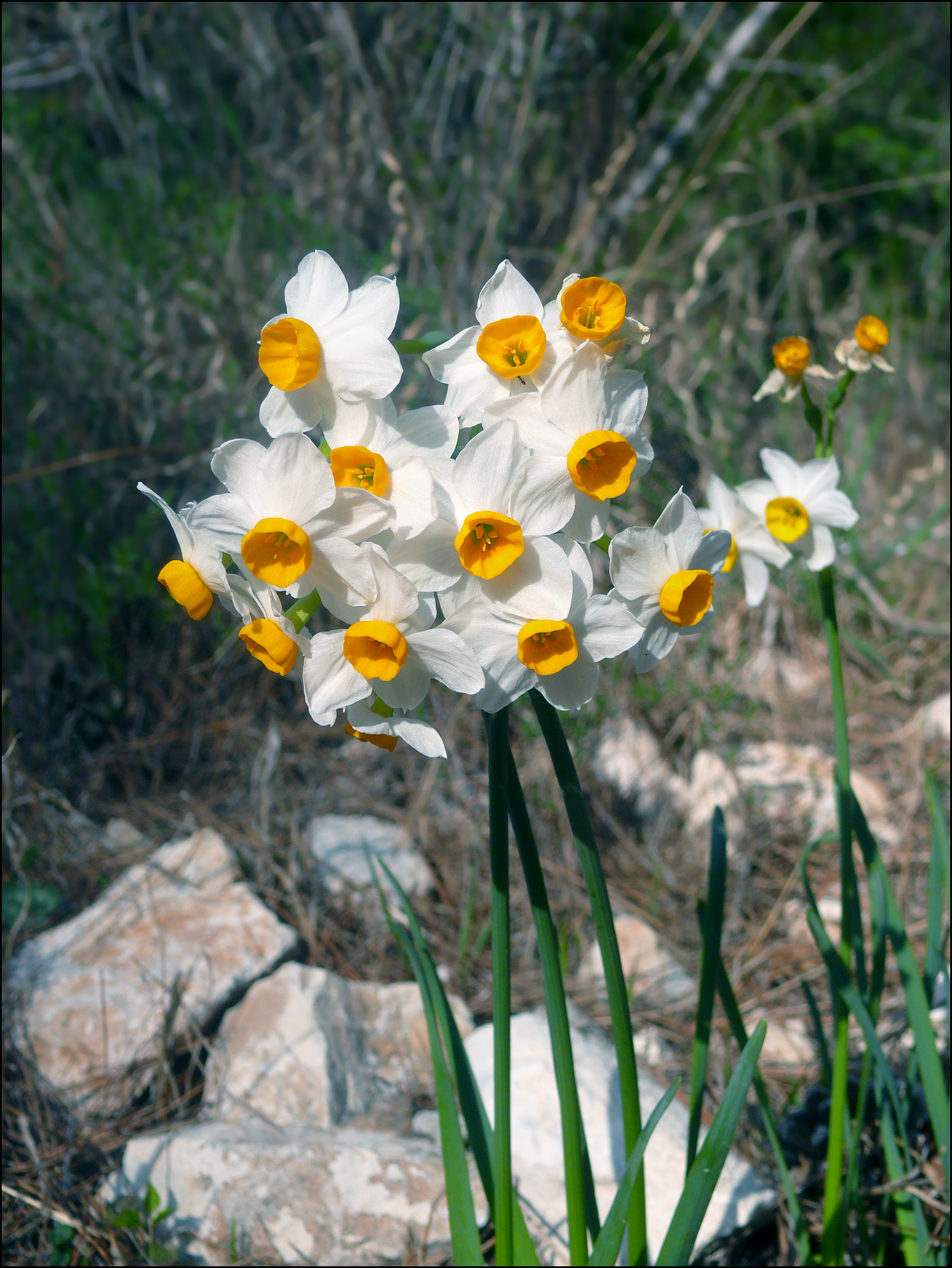
The mountain ecotype in Israel.

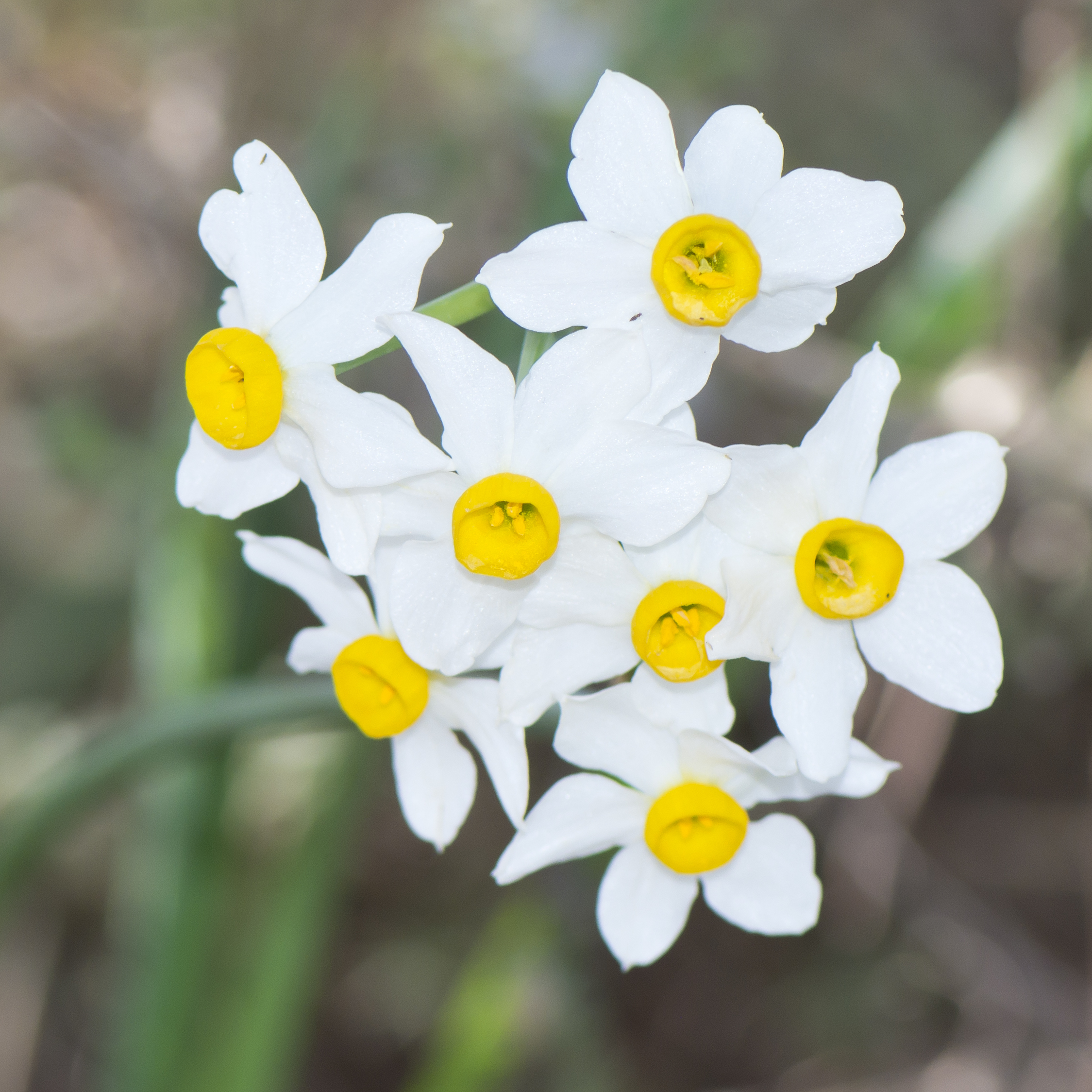
Close-up on flowers

Narcissus tazetta is amongst the tallest of the narcissi, and can grow to a height of up to 80 centimetres (31 in), with thin, flat leaves up to 40 centimetres (16 in) long and 15 millimetres (0.59 in) wide. Umbels have as many as 8 flowers, white with a yellow corona.

== Taxonomy ==
=== Subspecies ===
Six subspecies are accepted by the World Checklist of Selected Plant Families:

- N. tazetta subsp. aureus (Jord. & Fourr.) Baker syn. N. bertolonii – south-east France, Sardinia, north-west Italy, Algeria, Morocco
- N. tazetta subsp. canariensis (Burb.) Baker – Canary Islands
- N. tazetta subsp. chinensis (M.Roem.) Masam. & Yanagih. – south-east China, Japan, South Korea
- N. tazetta subsp. corcyrensis (Herb.) Baker – Corfu (Greece)
- N. tazetta subsp. italicus (Ker Gawl.) Baker syn. N. italicus – Mediterranean from southern France to Greece
- N. tazetta subsp. tazetta – widely distributed from the western Mediterranean to Afghanistan

== Ecology ==
Narcissus tazetta contains a fragrant compound found in only a few other plants, including roses and Acnistus arborescens, called orcinol dimethyl ether or 3,5-dimethoxytoluene, which is almost undetectable to the human nose. Experiments with honeybees have shown they can readily detect the substance.

== Distribution ==
Narcissus tazetta is a widespread species, native to the Mediterranean region from Portugal to Turkey. It is also naturalized across the Middle East, Central Asia, Iran, Afghanistan, Pakistan, India, Nepal and Bhutan, as well as the Canary Islands, China (Fujian, Zhejiang), Japan, Australia, Korea, Norfolk Island, New Zealand, Bermuda, Mexico and the United States (Oregon, California, Texas, Alabama, Arkansas, Florida, Louisiana, Mississippi, North Carolina, South Carolina, Virginia, and West Virginia) and South America.

== Uses ==
Narcissus tazetta is grown commercially for its essential oil, mostly in southern France. An interspecies hybrid, with Narcissus poeticus, is also grown for its essential oil.

== Bibliography ==
=== Books ===
- van Kampen et fils, Nicolas (1760). Traité des fleurs à oignons: contenant tout ce qui est nécessaire pour les bien cultiver, fondé sur une expérience de plusieurs années (in French). Harlem: Bohn. translated into English as (van Kampen & Son 1764)
- van Kampen & Son, Nicolas (1764). The Dutch florist, or, True method of managing all sorts of flowers with bulbous roots (translated (Harrison) from French: (van Kampen et fils 1760)) (2 ed.). London: Baldwin. "Next to the Hyacinths, Tulips, Ranunculuses, and Anemones, of which we have treated already, the Polyanthus Narcissus holds the first place and demands our chief attention"

=== Articles ===
- Rivka Dulberger (September 1964). "Flower Dimorphism and Self-Incompatibility in Narcissus tazetta L." Evolution. 18 (3): 361–363. doi:10.1111/j.1558-5646.1964.tb01613.x. JSTOR 2406347. S2CID 88184240.
- ARROYO, JUAN; DAFNI, AMOTS (January 1995). "Variations in habitat, season, flower traits and pollinators in dimorphic Narcissus tazetta L. (Amaryllidaceae) in Israel". New Phytologist. 129 (1): 135–145. doi:10.1111/j.1469-8137.1995.tb03017.x. PMID 33874423.
- Krelage, JH (17 April 1890). "On Polyanthus Narcissi". Journal of the Royal Horticultural Society. 12 (Daffodil Conference and Exhibition): 339–346.
- Ooi, Linda (Mar 2010). "Narcissus tazetta lectin shows strong inhibitory effects against respiratory syncytial virus, influenza A (H1N1, H3N2, H5N1) and B viruses". Journal of Biosciences (Bangalore). 35 (1): 95–103. doi:10.1007/s12038-010-0012-8. PMC 7091448. PMID 20413914.

=== Databases ===
- The Plant List
