= Barbara Drossel =

German physicist (born 1963)

- Born: 4 September 1963 (age 63); Cologne, Germany
- Education: Technical University of Munich
- Occupations: Physicist, academic
- Known for: Complex systems, science and religion

Barbara Drossel (born 4 September 1963) is a German physicist. Since 2002, she has been a professor of theoretical physics at the Technical University of Darmstadt where her group researches biological networks, theoretical ecology and the foundations of statistical physics.

== Biography ==
Drossel studied physics at the Technical University of Munich and in Strasbourg, France. In Munich, she was part of Franz Schwabl's research group, where she completed her diploma thesis (1989) and doctoral dissertation on Structure formation in open systems using a forest fire model as an example (1993). This work was followed by several postdoctoral positions at the Massachusetts Institute of Technology in Cambridge, Massachusetts (1994–1996), the University of Manchester in England (1996–1999), and Tel Aviv University in Israel. After receiving her habilitation degree in 1999 for her work on scaling behavior in disordered and non-equilibrium systems, she has been a professor of theoretical physics at the Institute of Solid State Physics at Technische Universität Darmstadt (Technical University of Darmstadt) since February 2002. More recently, she has written about the topic of emergence and top-down causation.

=== On science ===
Drossel's research interests concern the field of complex systems, which include biological systems, such as genetic networks, ecosystems and evolutionary processes, as well as physical systems such as soft materials (gels, polymers), chaos and pattern formation.

She has published numerous articles in the field of complex systems theory. She has been the spokesperson for the German Research Foundation (DFG) "Networks on Networks: Interaction of Structure and Dynamics in Extended Ecological Networks", established in 2012.

=== On religion ===
Drossel gives lectures on the nature of science and religion to general audiences and discusses religious topics such as the compatibility of faith and science. Since Autumn 2020, Drossel has been writing a blog discussing her viewpoint about faith and science.

== Memberships ==
- Associate of the Faraday Institute of Science and Religion
- Member of Christians in Science
- Member of the editorial board of the German science-faith journal Evangelium and Wissenschaft

== Awards ==
- 2011: Bad Herrenalb Academy Prize of the Evangelical Academy of Baden eV

== Selected works ==
- Drossel, Barbara, and Franz Schwabl. "Self-organized critical forest-fire model." Physical review letters 69, no. 11 (1992): 1629.
- Drossel, Barbara. "Biological evolution and statistical physics." Advances in physics 50, no. 2 (2001): 209–295.
- Drossel, Barbara, Paul G. Higgs, and Alan J. McKane. "The influence of predator–prey population dynamics on the long-term evolution of food web structure." Journal of Theoretical Biology 208, no. 1 (2001): 91–107.
- Drossel, Barbara, and Alan J. McKane. "Modelling food webs." Handbook of graphs and networks: from the genome to the internet (2002): 218–247.
- Drossel, Barbara. "Random boolean networks." Reviews of nonlinear dynamics and complexity (2008): 69–110.
