= Louise Plessner Pollock =

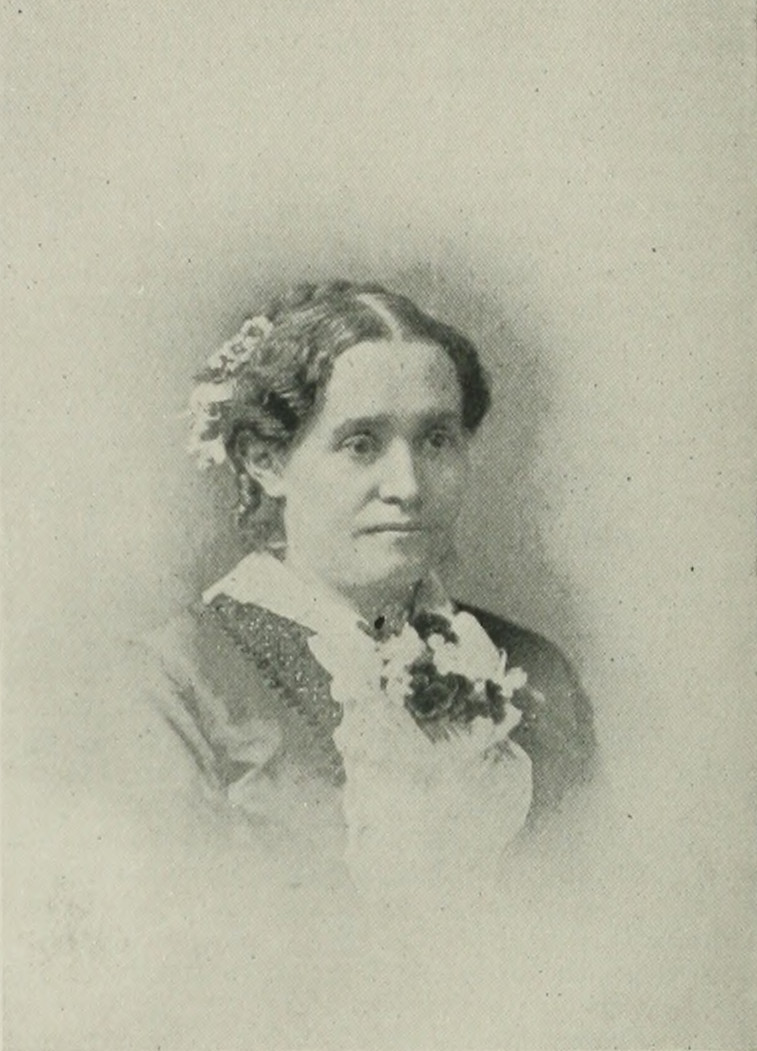
- Born: 29 October 1832; Erfurt
- Died: 24 July 1901 (aged 68); Skyland Resort

Louise Plessner Pollock (1833 in Germany – July 24, 1901, at Skyland, Virginia) was an influential early advocate of the kindergarten movement in 19th-century America.

Born Louise Caroline Frederica Augusta Victoria Wilhelmina von Pless (Anglicized as Plessner), she married in 1850 in Dresden to George Henry Pollock, who was born in Massachusetts in 1829. She is often stated to have opened the first kindergarten in America, but that seminal event actually took place in the home of Margarethe Meyer-Schurz in Watertown, Wisconsin, in 1854. Pollock did open the first kindergarten in West Newton, Massachusetts, in 1863 or 1864, other schools were modeled after her later National Kindergarten and Normal School in Washington, D.C., and she wrote and translated articles, song books, and education manuals about kindergartens which were important to the advancement of the kindergarten movement. Her daughters Susan Plessner Pollock and Wellesca Pollock Allen (an early adherent of the Baha'i Faith in America, who met the son of the founder of the faith, 'Abdu'l-Baha, during his travels in North America) were also active in the kindergarten movement, and influenced the popularity of kindergartens in Washington, D.C., and abroad.

Pollock's husband George Henry Pollock was a prosperous Washington, D.C., importer who formed the Miners' Lode Copper Company in 1845 and with partner Stephen M. Allen, president of the Massachusetts Historical Society in Boston, purchased 5,371 acres of land on Virginia's Stony Man Mountain, part of which was developed by the Pollocks' son George Freeman Pollock and later became the Skyland Resort.
