= Panorama Resort =

Coordinates: 38°39′35.5″N 78°19′16.3″W

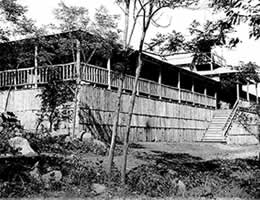
Panorama Resort in 1930

Panorama Resort was one of the early resorts that lined what is now Skyline Drive in the Shenandoah National Park (SNP) in the United States, located at Thornton Gap. Like Skyland Resort and Little Switzerland, it was one of many private mountain resorts with nature themes that predated Skyline Drive and the Blue Ridge Parkway. Once one of Virginia’s best-known resorts, Panorama most recently operated as a restaurant destination in the Shenandoah National Park and was run by Aramark Parks and Resorts, the commercial vendor inside SNP that operated sister resorts Big Meadows and Skyland Resort. It was demolished in 2008.

== History ==
Panorama opened July 20, 1924 and sat at the intersection of Skyline Drive and Route 211 between Sperryville, Virginia and Luray, Virginia. Bridging Virginia's Hunt Country and the Shenandoah Valley, it sat at the border of Page County and Rappahannock County along the top ridge line of the Blue Ridge. In its early days, it had a tea room, hotel, cottages, bungalow and golf.

Throughout the 20th century, Panorama was one of the best-known man-made attractions on the road, which included Rapidan Camp, built as a Presidential retreat within a reasonable traveling distance of the White House in Washington, DC for Herbert Hoover, and the resorts at Skyland and Big Meadows. Panorama had a rustic look in its early years and was known for its bear shows, though one went awry and sparked a lawsuit. It was privately owned, but taken by eminent domain at the establishment of the park. The resort was bulldozed for a replacement Panorama in 1958.

In the 1990s, the restaurant struggled due to the collapse in visitors to the park. Aramark turned the building over to SNP when it could no longer make it work. It became a stop-off point for hikes. The National Park Service had hoped to reopen the building as a museum honoring the Civilian Conservation Corps. However, in July 2006, Shenandoah Superintendent Chas Cartwright announced that Panorama would be demolished, as costs had risen more than the park could afford. In May 2008, he announced the imminent destruction of the restaurant/giftshop building and construction of a restroom on the site.

== See also ==
- Former counties, cities, and towns of Virginia
