= Wellesca Pollock =

American educator (1871–1940)

Wellesca Pollock Allen Dyar (February 12, 1871 – 1940) was an American educator and an early adherent to Baháʼí Faith in the United States. She was at the center of a Washington, D.C., society scandal in 1916.

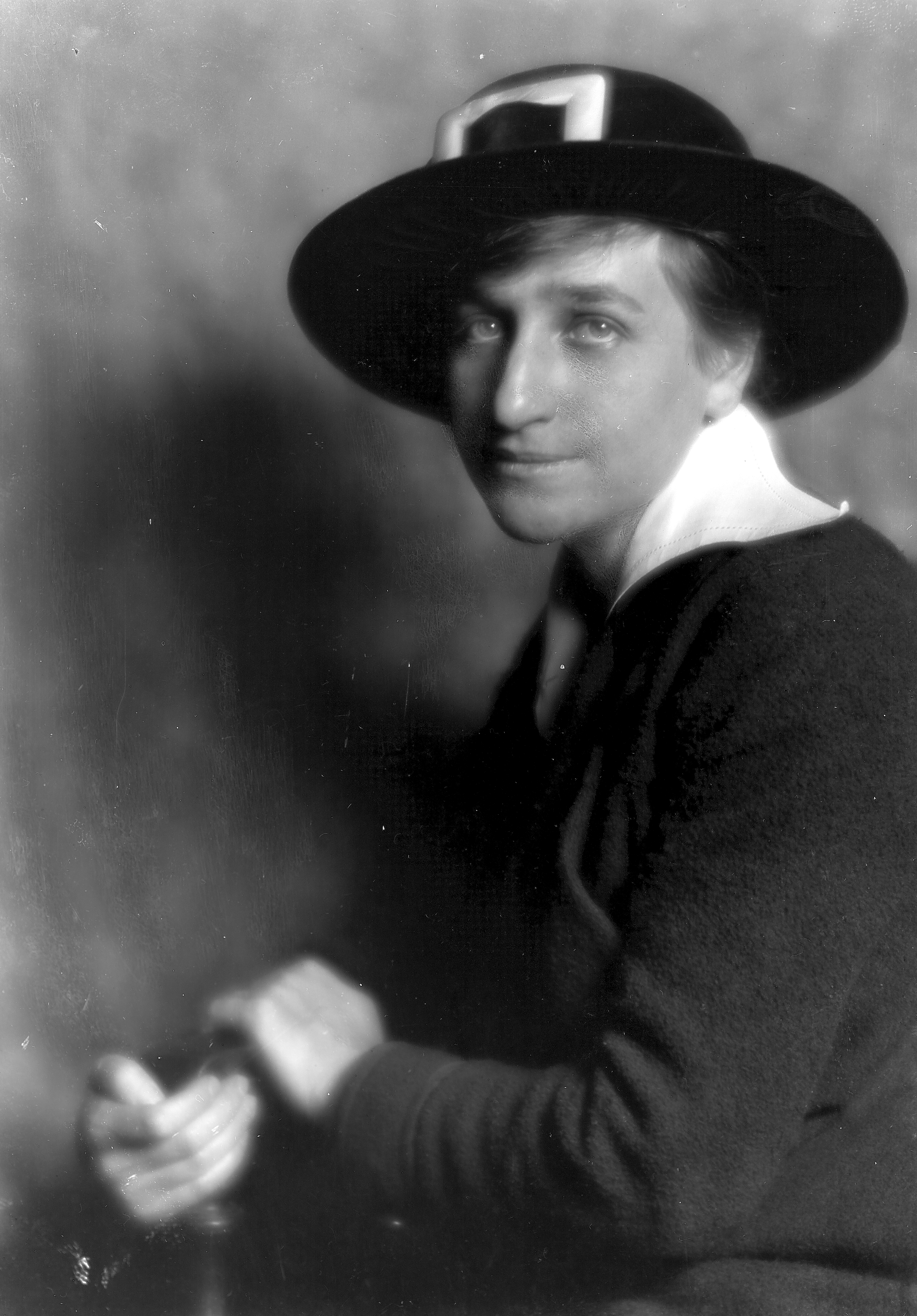

== Early life ==
Wellesca Pollock was the youngest survivor of the thirteen children born to Louise Plessner Pollock and George H. Pollock, at Weston, Massachusetts. Her brother, George Freeman Pollock, was the founder of Skyland Resort in Virginia. Their mother was an educator prominent in the kindergarten movement. Wellesca trained as a teacher, graduating from her mother's Washington Normal Kindergarten Institute in 1891.

== Career ==
Wellesca Pollock trained kindergarten teachers with her mother in Washington, D.C., and taught a kindergarten class for African-American children in the capital. In 1900 she began to identify as a follower of the Baháʼí Faith, and used the Persian name "Aseyeh" in that context. She traveled to Egypt, Syria, and Palestine to meet ʻAbdu'l-Bahá in 1907.

Wellesca Pollock made some significant money selling real estate in Washington, D.C. She also did part-time work at the Smithsonian Institution, assisting entomologist and fellow Baháʼí Harrison Gray Dyar Jr.

== Personal life ==
Wellesca Pollock was at the center of a public scandal when it became known that "Wilfred P. Allen", her absent husband, the father of her three sons (born 1908, 1911, and 1913), was a fiction. Her partner was in fact entomologist Harrison Gray Dyar Jr., who had another, legal, wife. The couple officially married after Dyar's divorce, in 1921. Dyar named a Mexican species of moth, Parasa wellesca, for her. Wellesca Pollock Dyar was widowed when Harrison died in 1929, and she died in 1940, aged 69 years.
