= Mary's Rock =

Mountain in Virginia, US

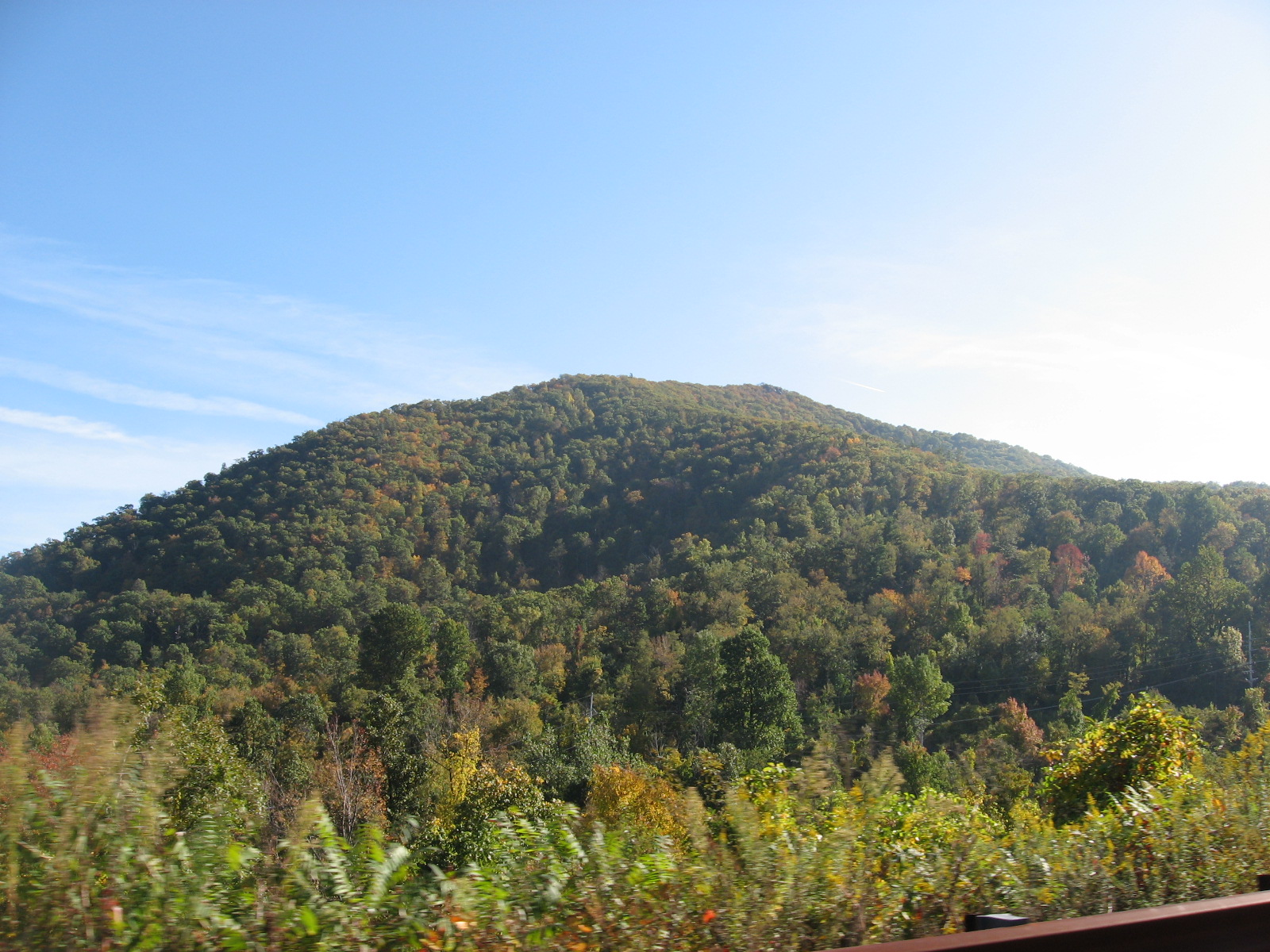
- Mary's Rock in Autumn

Highest point
- Elevation: 3,514 ft (1,071 m)
- Coordinates: 38°39′01″N 78°19′4″W

Geography
- Location: Page / Rappahannock counties, Shenandoah National Park
- Parent range: Blue Ridge Mountains

Climbing
- Easiest route: Hike

Mary's Rock, also known as Marys Rock, is a 3,514-foot (1,071 m) tall mountain in Shenandoah National Park, Virginia, United States. The peak is just south of the Thornton Gap Entrance of the park, and north of the taller Pinnacle. Mary's Rock is the eighth highest peak in Shenandoah National Park.

== Hiking Mary's Rock ==
Two trails lead to the summit of Mary's Rock. One which starts from the Panorama Visitor Center and the other which starts from the Meadow Spring Parking Area. The trail from Panorama is somewhat longer and steeper, and is generally considered more difficult. It follows the white-blazed Appalachian Trail. The other trail is shorter and somewhat less difficult. The summit of the rock offers views of the northern section of Shenandoah National Park and Page Valley.

== Legends of Mary's Rock ==
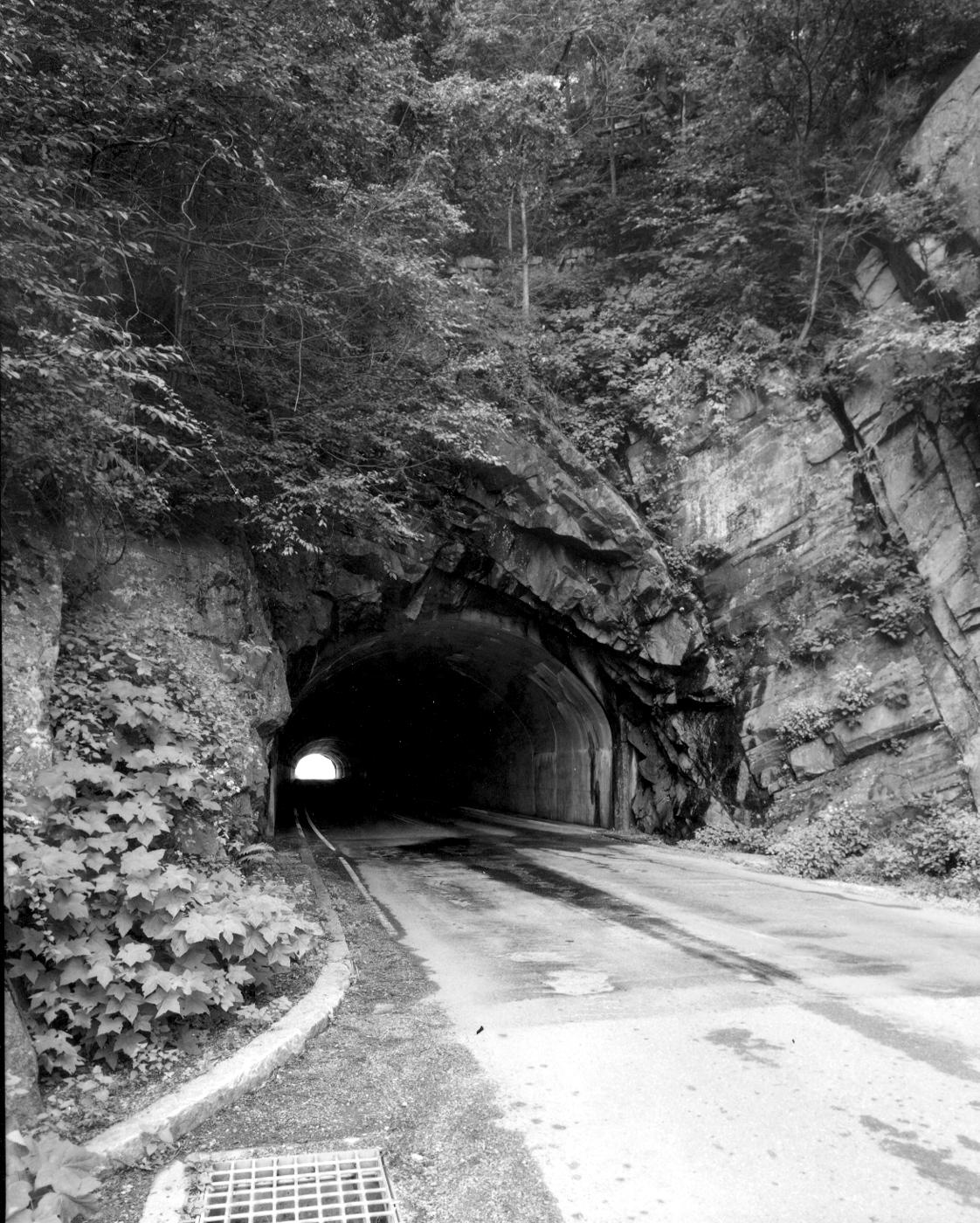
Mary's Rock Tunnel

Mary's Rock has its fair share of legends of how the rock was named. One story claims that Francis Thornton wed Mary Savage and brought her up the mountain to show her the lands they would own together. In 2017, the song Mary's Rock, written by Will Hopkins, was recorded by Terry Baucom's Dukes of Drive. The popular bluegrass group had chart success with a version of this story, suggesting Francis Thornton pushed Mary, or Mary slipped and fell off the rock to her untimely death, allowing Thornton to inherit the land. Another legend claims that Thornton had a daughter named Mary, who climbed up the mountain when she was young and came back with a bear cub under her arm. Yet another states that it was named after the wife of William Randolph Barbee.

== Marys Rock Tunnel ==
Marys Rock Tunnel is a 670-foot (200 m) long tunnel blasted through the mountain that Skyline Drive passes through. Constructed in 1932, it is considered one of the engineering feats of Skyline Drive.
