= Marys Rock Tunnel =

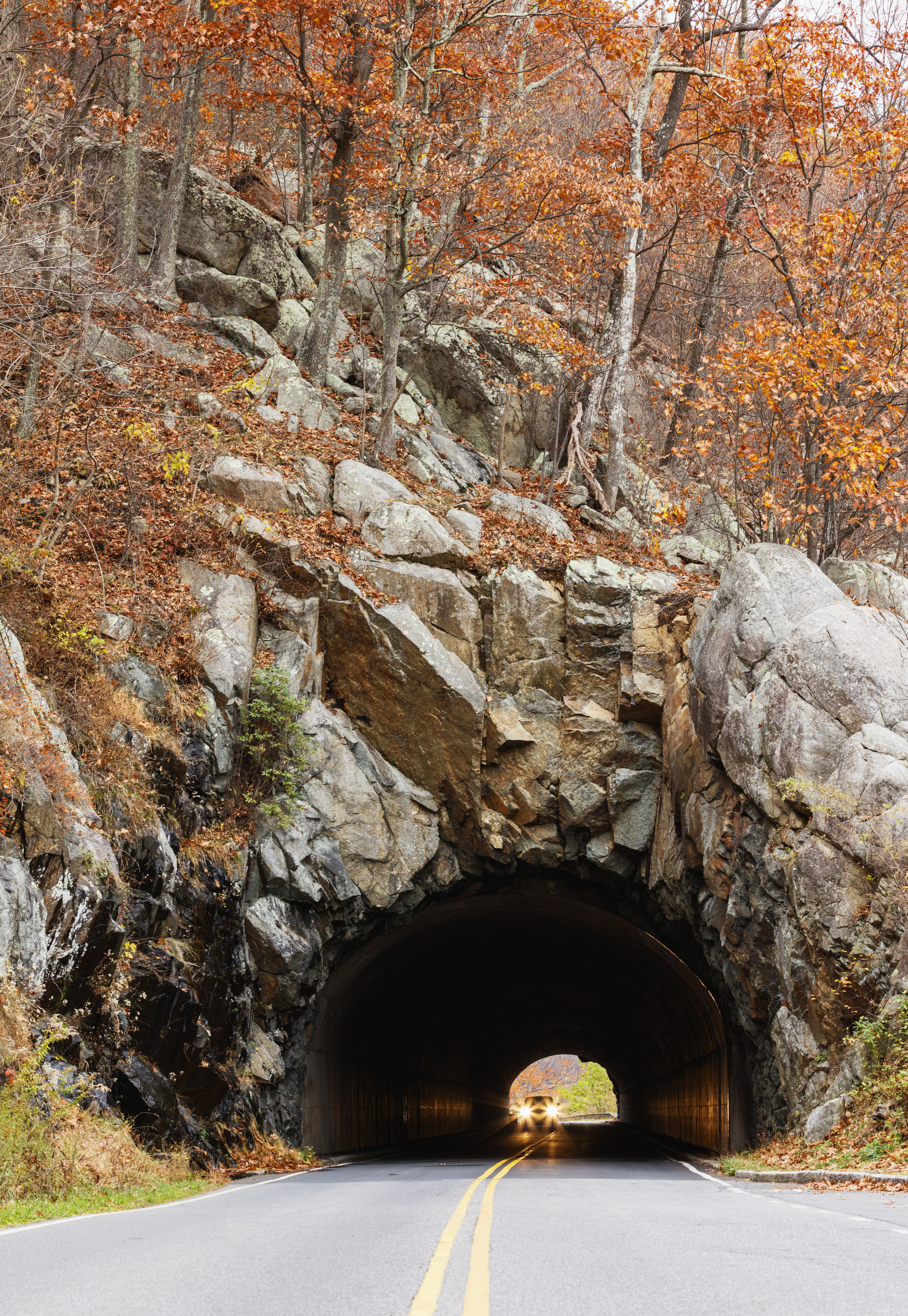
- Looking north into Marys Rock Tunnel
- Interactive map of Marys Rock Tunnel

Overview
- Official name: Marys Rock Tunnel
- Location: Rappahannock County, Virginia, USA
- Coordinates: 38°39′15.29″N 78°18′44.93″W
- Route: Skyline Drive

Operation
- Opened: 1932
- Toll: None

Technical
- Length: 670 ft (204.22 m)
- No. of lanes: 2
- Tunnel clearance: 12 ft 8 in (3.86 m)

The Marys Rock Tunnel is a vehicular tunnel in the Blue Ridge Mountains. Located at mile marker 32.2 on Skyline Drive, the scenic byway that traverses the length of Shenandoah National Park, it is the only vehicular tunnel in the park. Constructed in 1932 by workers employed with the Civilian Conservation Corps, the tunnel workers took three months to drill and blast through the east slopes of Mary's Rock (3,514 ft (1,071 m)). The two lane tunnel is 670 ft (200 m) long and only 12 ft 8 in (3.86 m) high, so recreational vehicles and taller trucks need to check their height restrictions before traveling through it.

== See also ==
- List of tunnels documented by the Historic American Engineering Record in Virginia
