= Three Notch'd Road =

Colonial-era route across Virginia

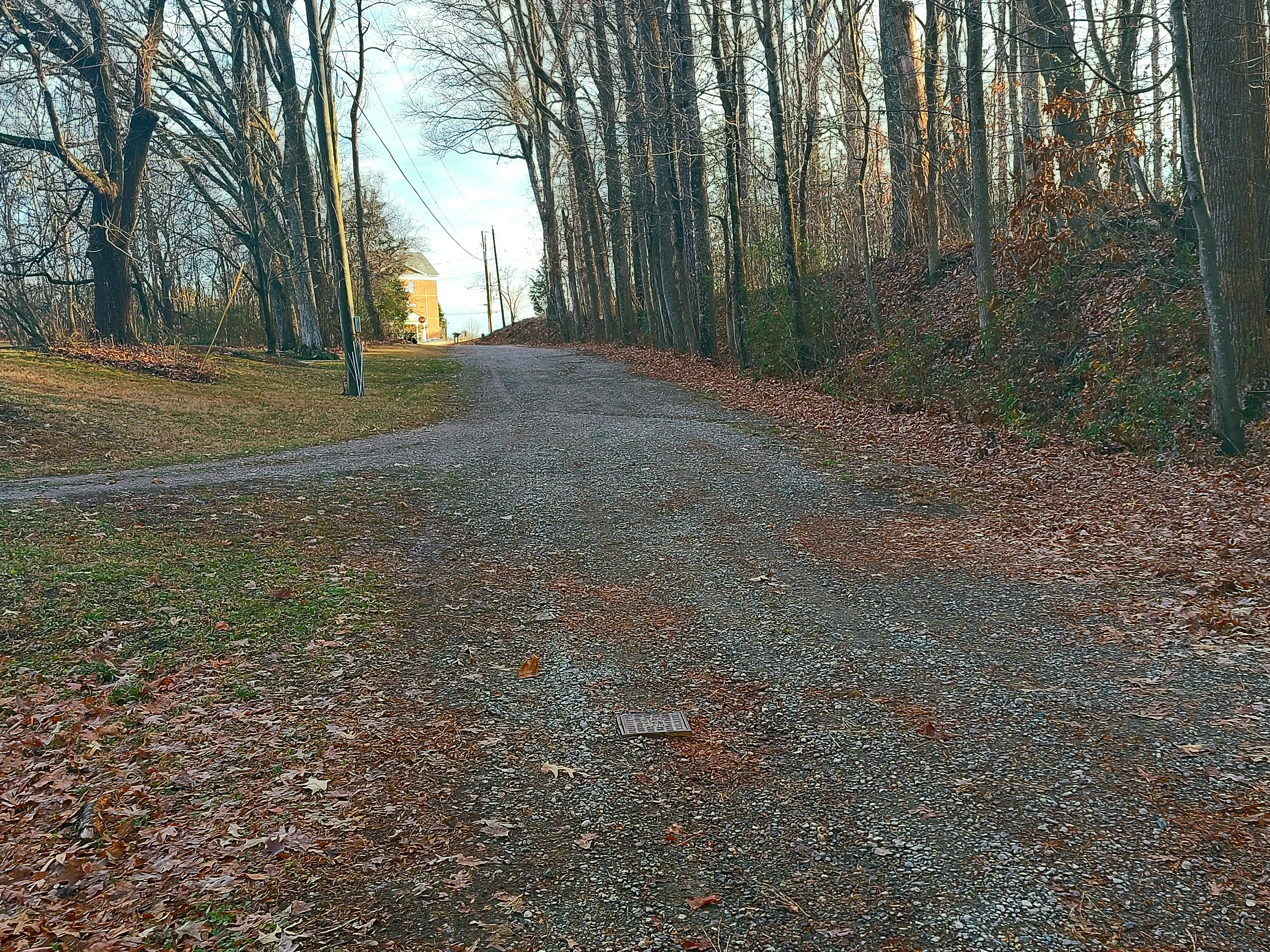
A now-removed portion of the road located in Short Pump

Three Notch'd Road (also called Three Chopt Road) was a colonial-era major east-west route across central Virginia. It is believed to have taken its name from a distinctive marking of three notches cut into trees to blaze the trail. By the 1730s, the trail extended from the vicinity of the fall line of the James River at the future site of Richmond westerly to the Shenandoah Valley, crossing the Blue Ridge Mountains at Jarmans Gap. In modern times, a large portion of U.S. Route 250 in Virginia follows the historic path of the Three Notch'd Road, as does nearby Interstate 64.

== Jack Jouett's Ride ==
During the American Revolutionary War, a young Virginian named Jack Jouett is credited with an epic nighttime ride by horseback. He sounded a warning alert at Monticello and the town of Charlottesville of secretly approaching British troops seeking to capture the Governor of Virginia and key members of the Virginia General Assembly. Portions of Jouett's famous ride took place on the Three Notch'd Road.

In late May 1781, after General Benedict Arnold, who had defected to the British, had attacked the Virginia capital of Richmond, Governor Thomas Jefferson and Virginia's legislature, including Patrick Henry, Richard Henry Lee, Thomas Nelson, Jr., and Benjamin Harrison V fled to Charlottesville, Virginia (Jefferson's home, Monticello, was nearby). Learning of this, British General Charles Cornwallis ordered Lieutenant Colonel Banastre Tarleton to ride to Charlottesville and capture them. On June 3, with 180 cavalrymen and 70 mounted infantry of the Royal Welsh Fusiliers, Tarleton left his camp on the North Anna River, marching his force covertly. With a fast maneuver designed to catch the politicians completely unaware, he had planned to cover the last 70 miles (110 km) in 24 hours.

Captain Jack Jouett of the Virginia Militia, then twenty-seven years old, was asleep on the lawn of the Cuckoo Tavern (or by another account at his father's house) in Louisa County, Virginia that night when he heard the sound of approaching cavalry and spotted Tarleton's British cavalry. Jouett was acutely aware of the military situation; his father and brother Matthew were also captains in the Virginia Militia, as was brother Robert in the Continental Army. He correctly suspected that the cavalry were marching to Charlottesville, where he knew that the legislature was completely undefended. Realizing the only hope for Jefferson and the legislators was advanced warning in time to escape, Jouett quickly mounted his horse, a bay mare named Sallie, and, as the British paused for a 3-hour rest, began the 40-mile (60 km) ride. Lit by a full moon, he had to ride fast enough to beat the British and warn the Virginians. Reaching Monticello about 5:00 AM, Jouett warned Governor Jefferson, and then went on to Charlottesville, where most of legislators were staying at the Swan Tavern, which was owned by Jouett's father. The legislators decided to flee west on the Three Notch'd Road, cross the Blue Ridge, and reconvene in Staunton, 35 miles (56 km) away, in three days. Jouett's warning allowed most legislators to escape, but seven were caught. On the way west, as the British closed in, Jouett used a diversionary tactic to help General Edward Stevens, who was recovering from wounds he received at the Battle of Guilford Courthouse, escape. Recognizing their debt to Jouett, the legislature passed a resolution on June 15, 1781 to honor him, and "Jack Jouett's Ride" became a legendary portion of Virginia's history.

== Marquis de Lafayette ==
Late in the Revolutionary War, Marquis de Lafayette, the General commanding the French troops supporting the Continental Army, camped in Albemarle County along the Three Notch'd Road at Giles Allegre's Tavern (Later named Lafayette Hill Tavern, 37.988085°N 78.31379°W) on Mechunk Creek while guarding important munitions stored at the Old Albemarle County Courthouse located at Scottsville on the James River.

== U.S. Route 250 ==
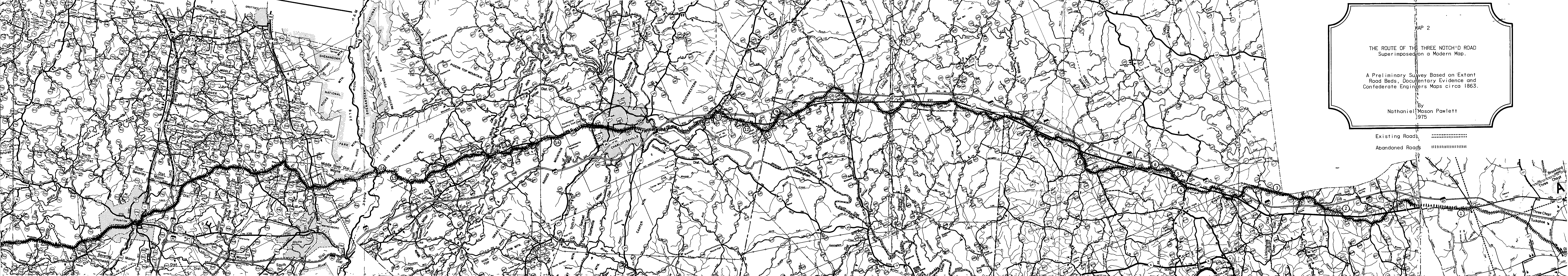
The road's routing west of Short Pump overlaid on a modern map (click to enlarge)

Much of the current U.S. Route 250 (established in the 1930s) from Short Pump in Henrico County west to Crozet in Albemarle County closely follows its path. In the City of Charlottesville, which was established near the headwaters of the Rivanna River, West Main Street and part of University Avenue near the University of Virginia follow its original course. In the 1960s and 1970s, Interstate 64 was completed nearby, also closely paralleling the Three Notch'd Road.

== In Henrico County, Richmond ==
Another portion of the old road, now known as Three Chopt Road, runs from Short Pump through western Henrico County and the City of Richmond, ending at the former unincorporated town of Rio Vista at the intersection of State Route 147. Research by the Henrico County Historical Society revealed a map of Henrico County dated 1819 showing the road marked as "Three Chopped Road". Years later, they found the spelling of the road changed to Three Chopt on a map of 1853.
