= Jarman Gap =

Mountain pass in Virginia, US

- Location within Virginia
- Elevation: 2,172 feet (662 m)
- Traversed by: SR 611 (Jarmans Gap Road)

Third Approach
- Location: Albemarle / Augusta counties, Virginia, United States
- Range: Blue Ridge Mountains
- Coordinates: 38°05′52″N 78°46′51″W

Jarman Gap (also Jarman's Gap or Jarmans Gap) is a wind gap in the Blue Ridge Mountains in the counties of Albemarle and Augusta, Virginia.

== Geography ==
Jarman Gap is located approximately 6.7 miles (10.8 km) northeast of Waynesboro, Virginia and 16.7 miles (26.9 km) west-northwest of Charlottesville, Virginia at an elevation of 2,172 feet (662 m).

== History ==
Jarman Gap, known as Woods' Gap in its early history, was a major early crossing of the Blue Ridge Mountains. The gap was originally a buffalo trail and a Native American path, and is the site of the earliest settlement in the area. Michael Woods was the first European to settle in the Blue Ridge Mountains of Albemarle County, having traveled down the Shenandoah Valley from Pennsylvania in 1734. Woods and his family crossed the Blue Ridge using what is today known as Jarman Gap, and settled on a 2,006-acre plot registered in 1737 called "Mountain Plains" on the eastern slope of the gap. This gap became known as Woods' Gap after the family, and was renamed as Jarman Gap around 1800, when Thomas Jarman bought the property. Jarman Gap was also crossed by the historic Three Notch'd Road, a colonial era road in use by the 1730s. The portion of the Three Notch'd Road over then Woods' Gap was constructed by Michael Woods from west to east beginning in 1737. During the American Civil War, Confederate General Thomas "Stonewall" Jackson moved troops over Jarman Gap in 1862. Today, Rockfish Gap, 6.3 miles (10.1 km) southwest of Jarman Gap, serves as the main crossing of the Blue Ridge from Albemarle County to Augusta County via U.S. Route 250, Interstate 64, and the CSX Transportation rail line.
