= Skyland Resort =

Small privately owned resort on Skyline Drive in the Shenandoah National Park

Coordinates: 38.593021°N 78.380237°W

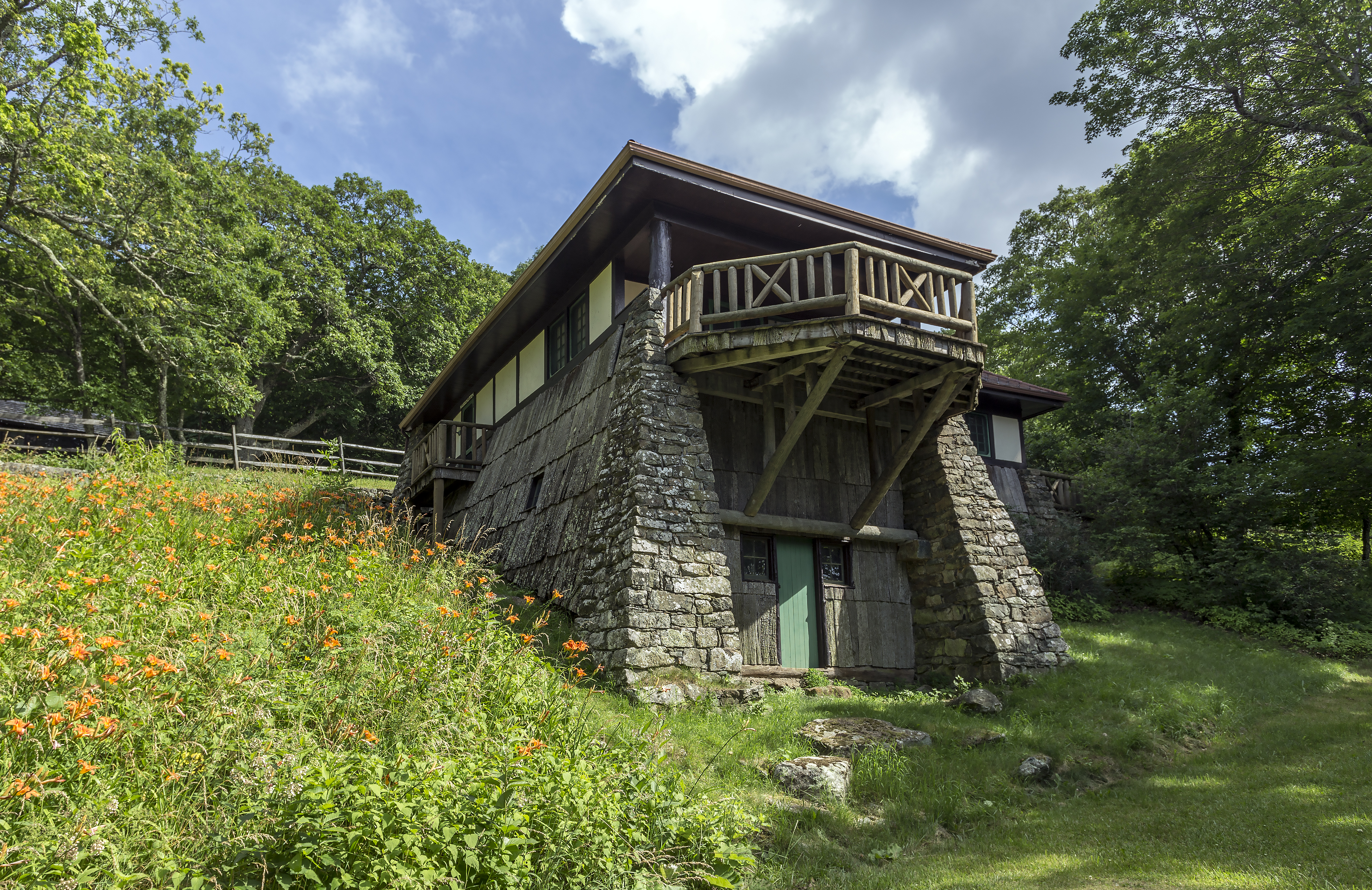
Massanutten Lodge in Skyland Resort

Skyland Resort is a hotel and resort in Shenandoah National Park in Virginia.

The Skyland Resort, originally called Stony Man Camp, was built in 1895 at what later became the highest point on the Skyline Drive, with a sweeping view of the Shenandoah Valley at 3,680 feet. It was built in 1895 by George Freeman Pollock, a young Washington, DC man whose father owned a great deal of the land surrounding the resort. Skyland was intended to be a place where the affluent people from major cities would come to relax and recreate. Early in its life, it was advertised as a dude ranch. When it opened, transportation was by horse or wagon. It competed with the nearby Panorama Resort, which opened in 1924.

Around 1931, it was taken over by the Shenandoah National Park, and the Skyline Drive was built past it. Rather than destroying the improvements to restore the natural environment as was the practice in most parts of the Park as it was established between 1924 and 1936, Skyland's accommodations were expanded, and are available to visitors today.

== Gallery ==
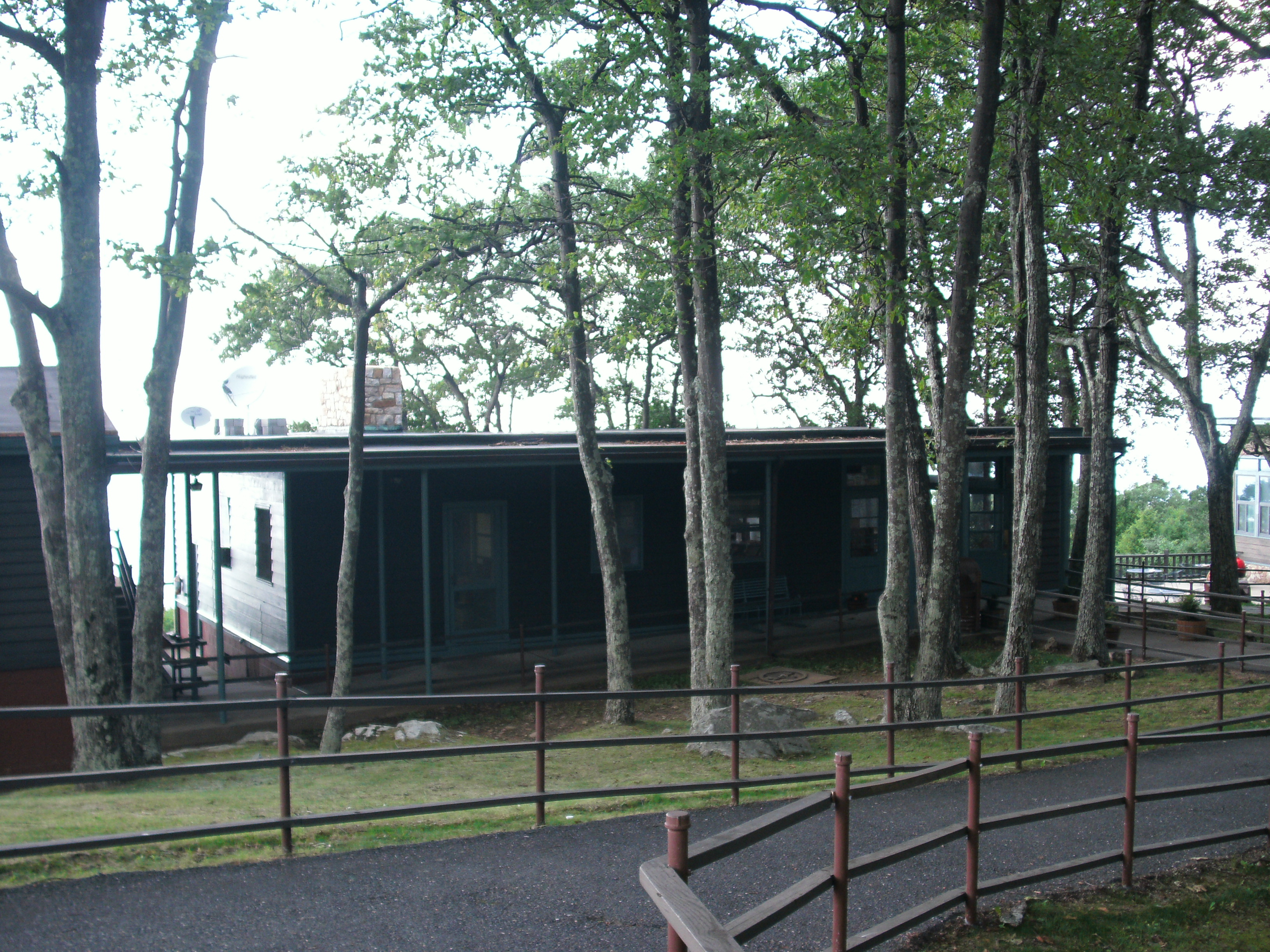
Booking office

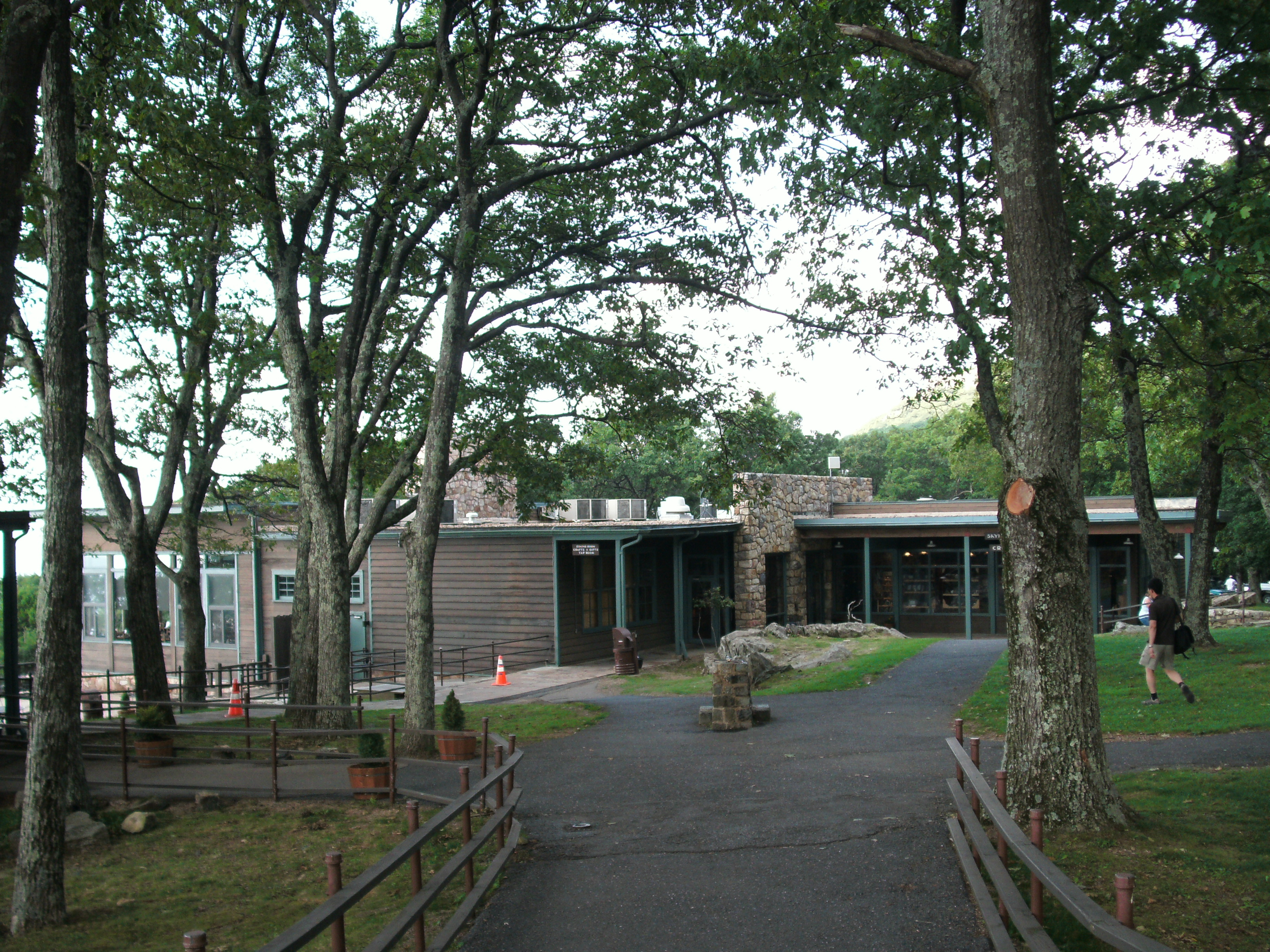
Restaurant and gift shop

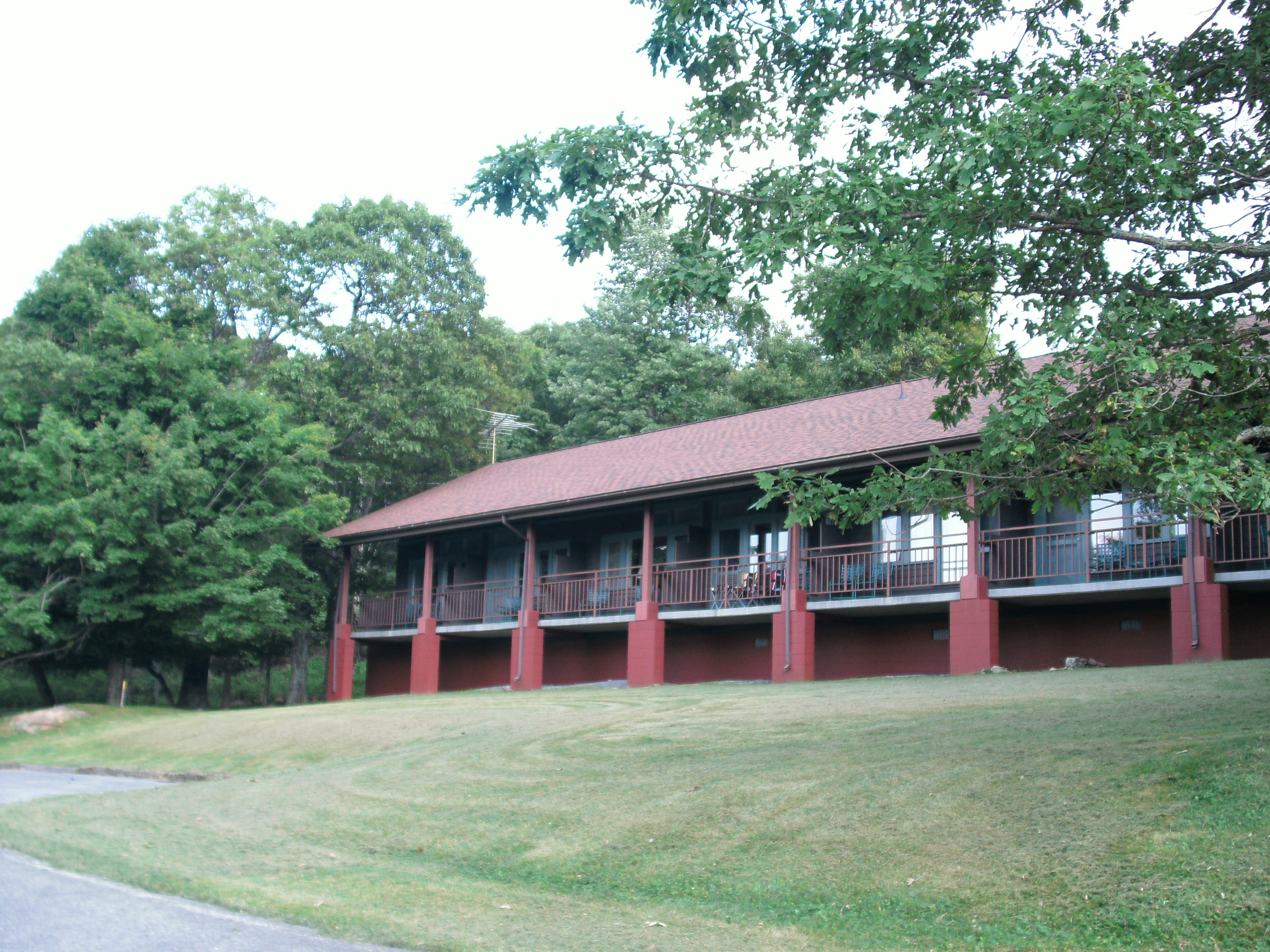
"Bushytop", one of the lodge buildings

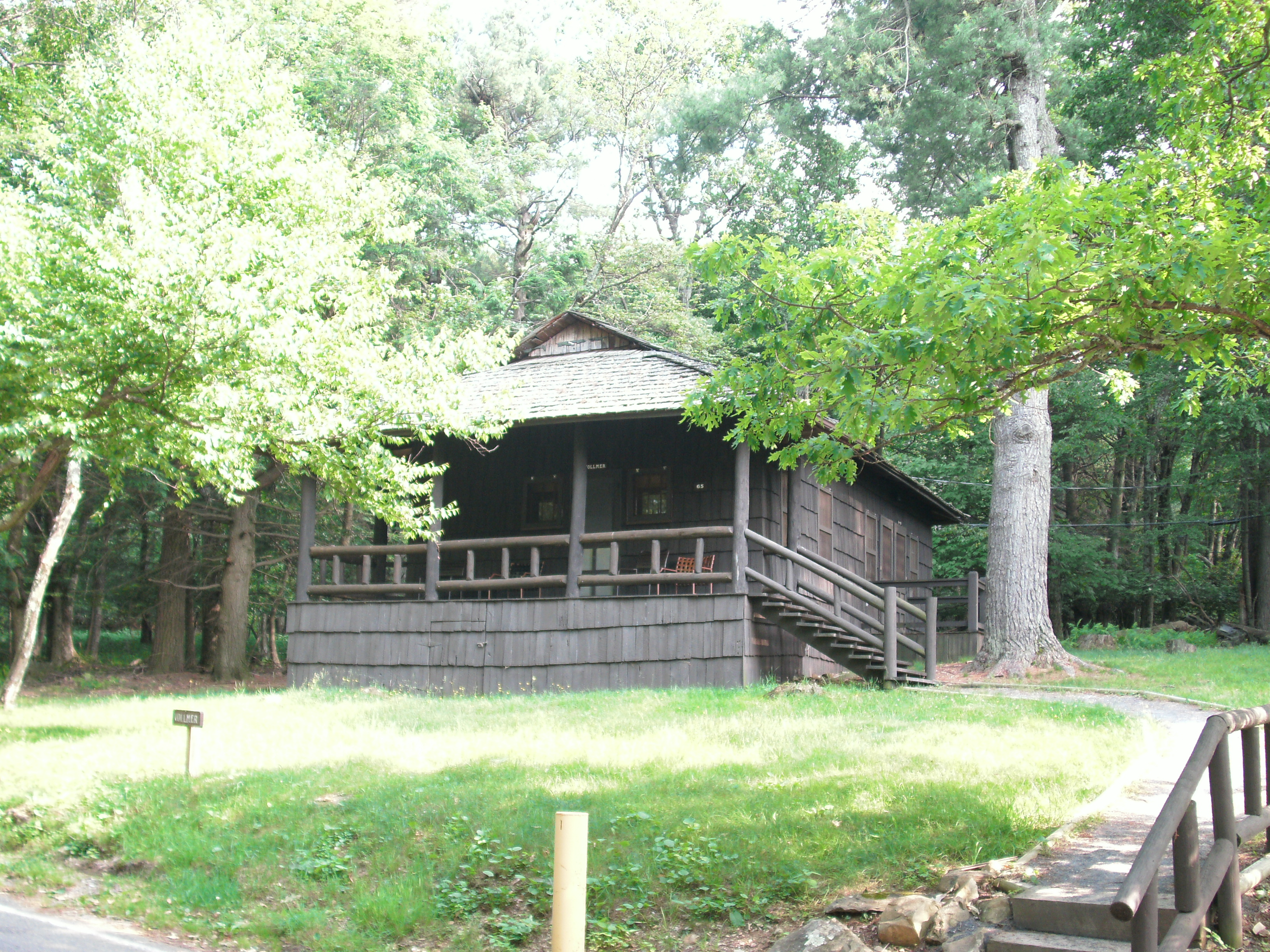
"Vollmer", a cabin on the property

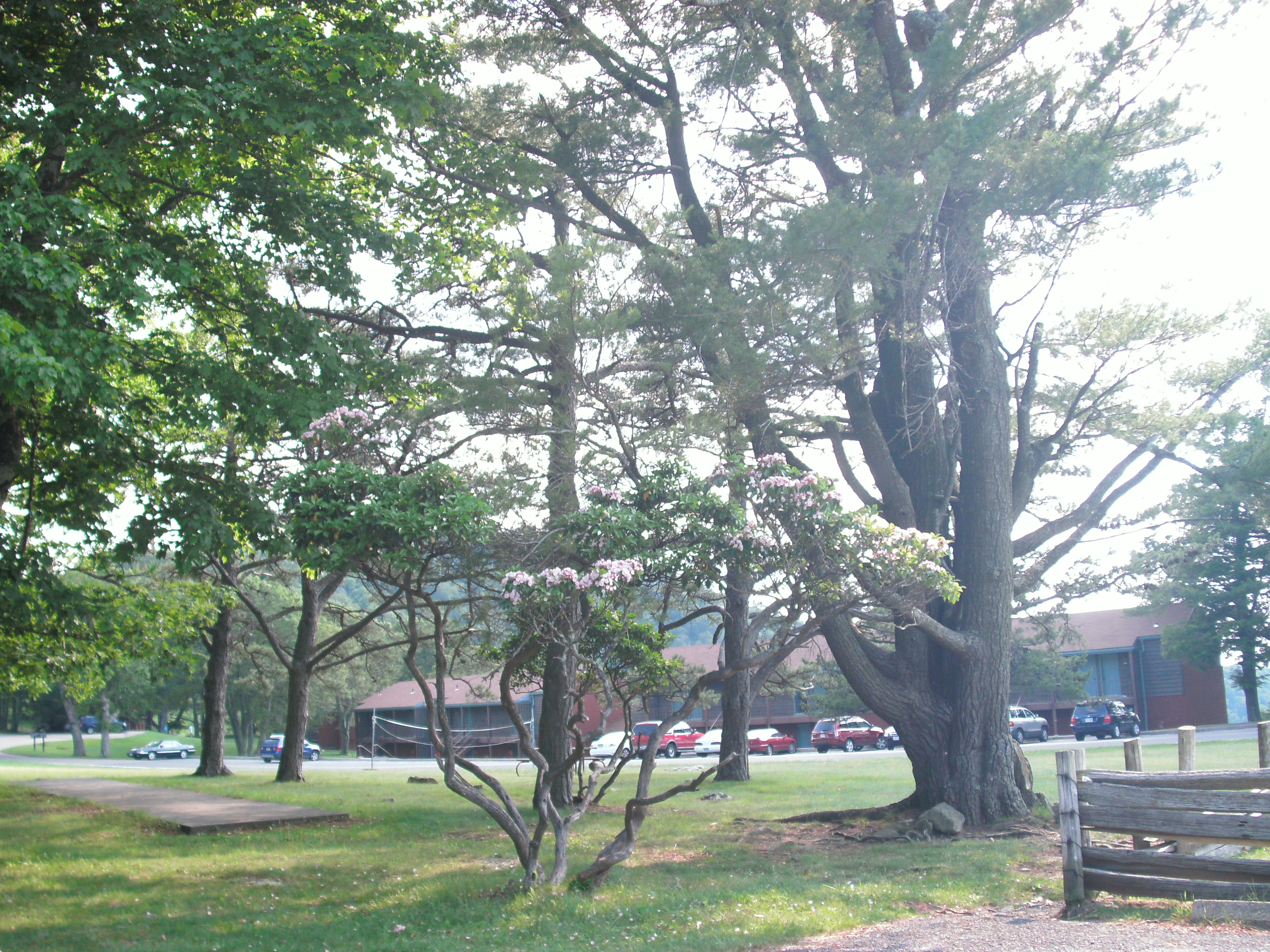
Parking area and lodge buildings

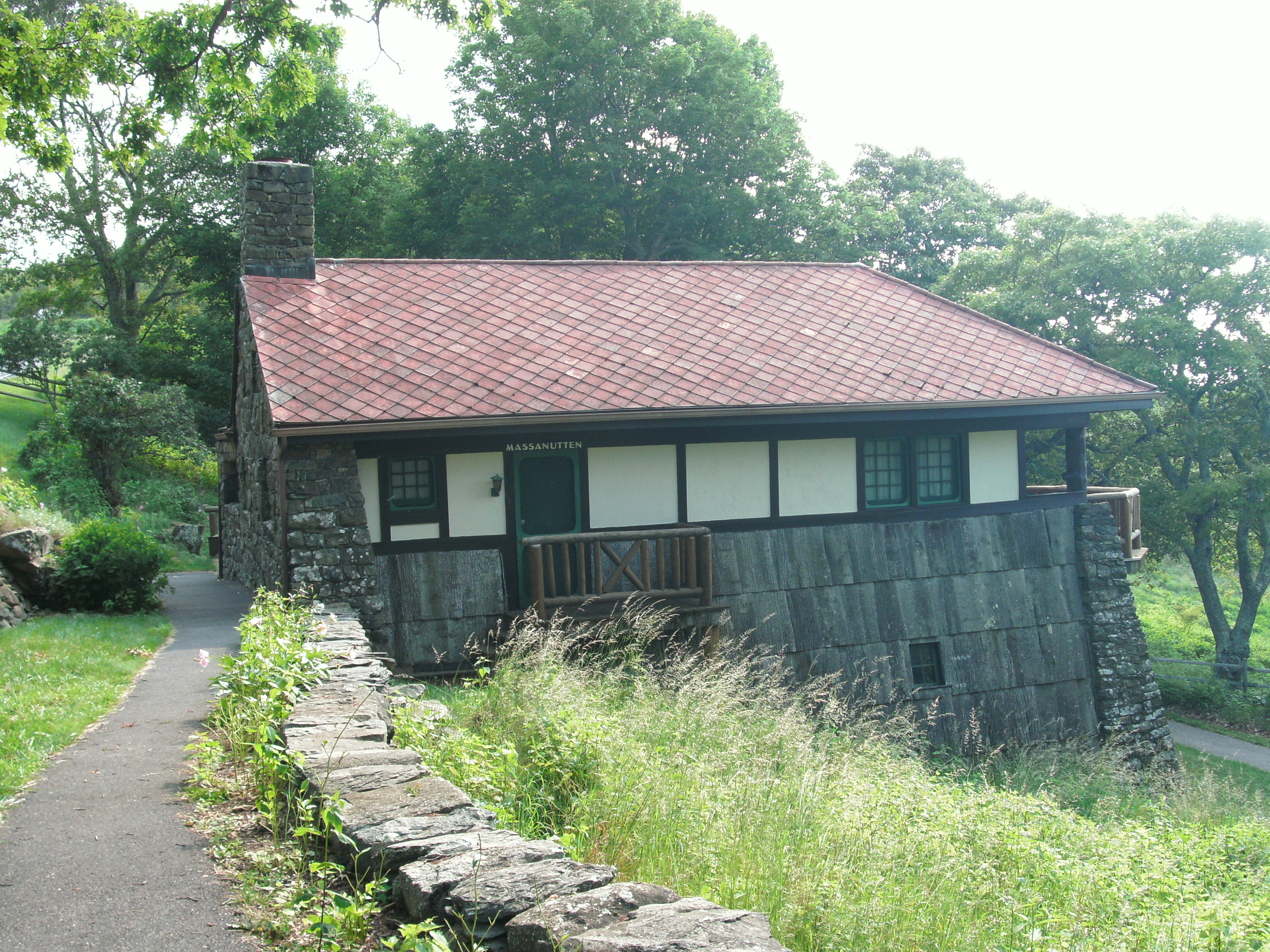
Massanutten Lodge, which today contains exhibits on the history of the resort

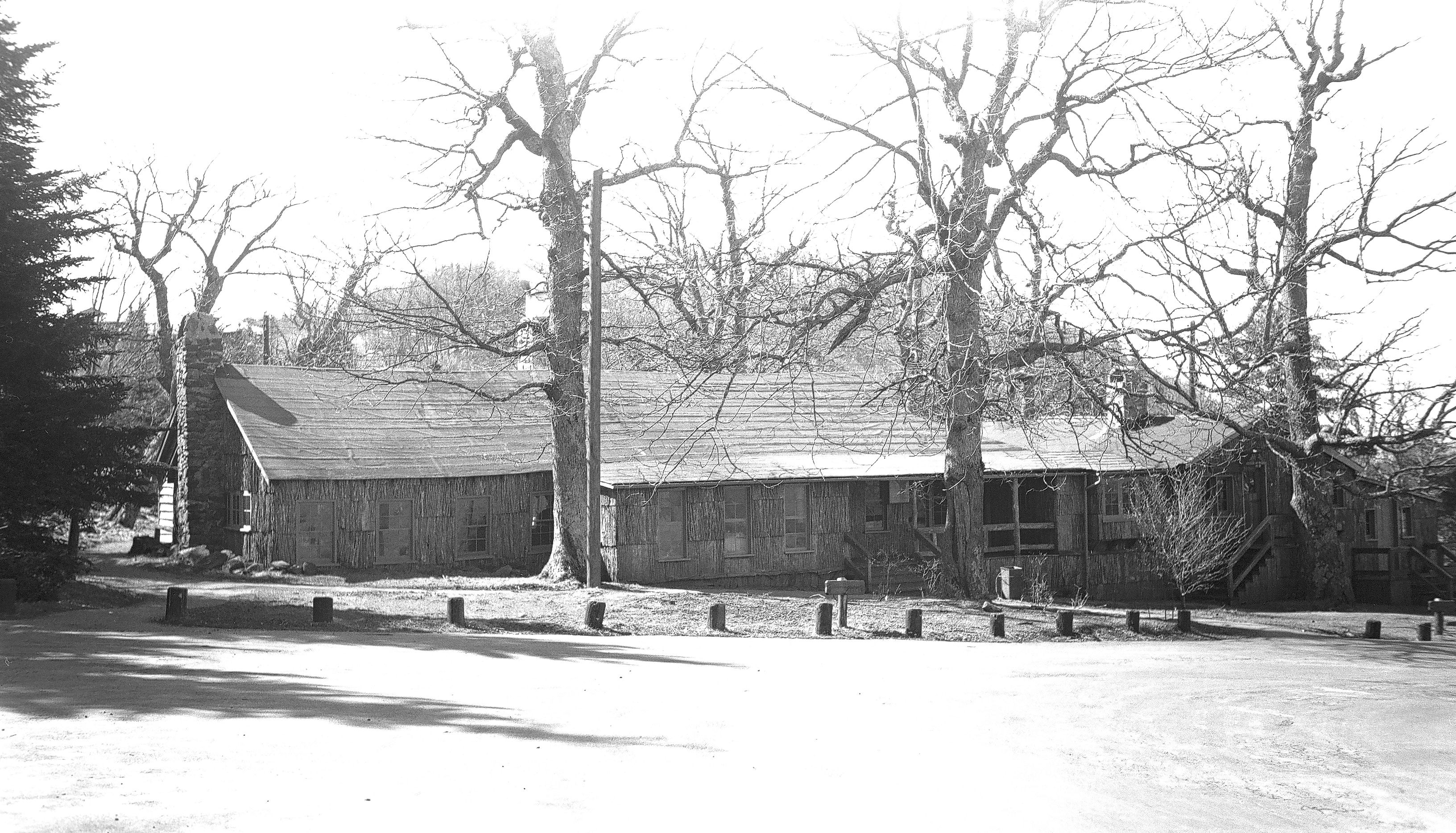
Skyland's coffee shop in 1948

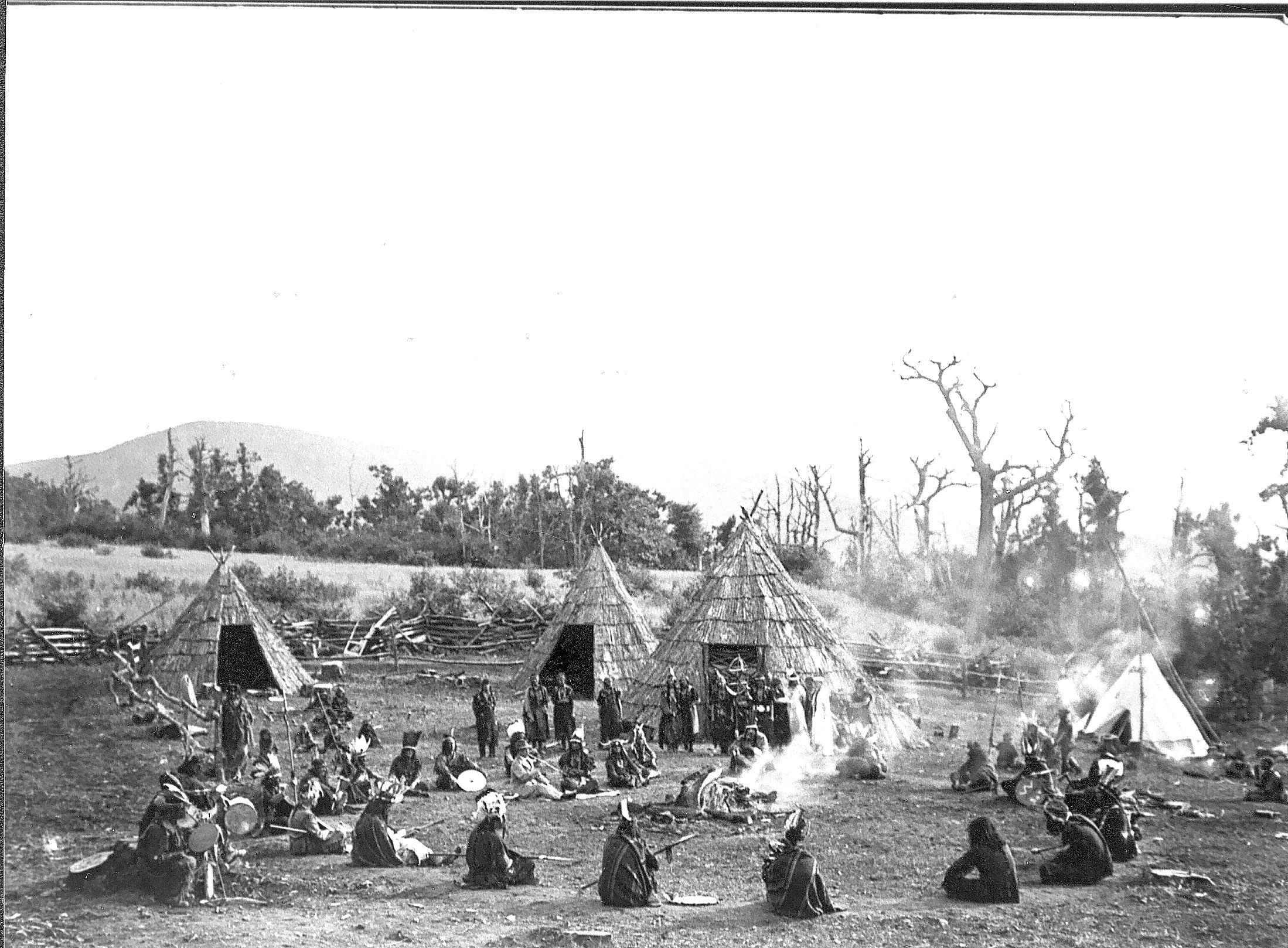
"Indian Pow-Wow at Stony Man Camp"
