= Barbe =

Barbe or Barbé is a surname, and may refer to:

- David Barbarossa, whose real surname is Barbe, English drummer
- Angelika Barbe (born 1951), German biologist and politician
- David Barbe (born 1963), American musician and producer/engineer
- François Barbé-Marbois (1745–1837), French politician
- Ghislain Barbe, Canadian illustrator and artist
- Helmut Barbe (1927–2021), German composer
- Henri Barbé (1902–1966), French communist
- Jane Barbe (1928–2003), American voice actress and singer
- Koen Barbé (born 1981), Belgian road bicycle racer
- Laurent Barbé (1696–1764), French citizen and Danish shipbuilder
- Pierre Barbe (1900–2004), French architect

== See also ==
- Barbey (disambiguation)
- Barbee (disambiguation)
- Barbie (disambiguation)
- Barbi (disambiguation)
- Barby (disambiguation)
- Barb (disambiguation)
