= Barbee =

Barbee may refer to:

== People ==
=== Given name or nickname ===
- Barbee (singer) (born 1989), Jamaican singer

=== Surname ===
- Andrew Russell Barbee Jr. (1827–1903), American surgeon
- Anita Barbee, American social psychologist
- Bud Barbee (1914–2000), American baseball player
- Carol Barbee (born 1959), American television writer, actress and producer
- Dave Barbee (1905–1968), American baseball player
- George Barbee (1850–1939), English-born American jockey
- Herbert Barbee (1848–1936), American sculptor
- John Barbee (1815–1888), the tenth Mayor of Louisville, Kentucky
- John Henry Barbee (1905–1964), American blues singer and guitarist
- Lamb Barbee (1916–1986), American baseball player
- Lloyd Barbee (1925–2002), American politician
- Rankin Barbee (1874–1958), American journalist and writer on Southern history
- Tony Barbee (born 1971), American basketball coach
- William Randolph Barbee (1818–1868), American sculptor

=== Middle name ===
- Ransom B. Moore (1827–1904), California pioneer and Arizona Territory legislator

== Places ==
United States

- Barbee, Indiana, a town
- Barbee Lake, a lake in Indiana

== See also ==
- Barbie (disambiguation)
- Barby (disambiguation)
- Barbi (disambiguation)
- Barbey (disambiguation)
- Barbe (disambiguation)
