= Wire (disambiguation) =

A wire is a strand of drawn metal used especially in electrical conductors and fencing.

Wire or wires may also refer to:

== Abbreviations ==
- Wire, a covert listening device worn as a wire under a person's clothes
- Wire, an informal term for a telegraph
- Wire, an informal term for a cablegram
- Wire service, a journalism-jargon term for news agency (a newswire or wire service)
- Wire tap, police jargon for covert telephone-listening device
- Wire transfer, a method of sending money directly between banks

== Types of wire ==
- Barbed wire, steel fencing wire
- Chicken wire, a mesh of wire
- Concertina wire, a type of barbed wire or razor wire
- Copper-clad aluminium wire, inner aluminium core and outer copper cladding
- Electrical wiring, electrical installation of cabling and associated devices
- Electroluminescent wire, thin copper wire coated in a phosphor
- Glass-coated wire, fine glass-coated metal filaments
- Magnet wire, copper or aluminium wire coated with a very thin layer of insulation
- Nanowire, 1-D structures used in nanoelectronics and nanowire battery anodes
- Razor wire
- Wire rope, twisted strands of metal wire
- Wire recording, audio storage on a thin steel wire

== People ==
- Wíres (footballer) (born 1982), Brazilian football player
- Coy Wire (born 1978), American footballer, television anchor, and correspondent
- Edith Wire (1899–1973), American composer, pianist, and writer; Lester's sister
- Lester Wire (1887–1958), inventor, Edith's brother
- Nicky Wire (born 1969), musician with the Welsh rock band Manic Street Preachers
- Kurt Wires (1919–1992), sprint canoer

== Arts, entertainment, and media ==
=== Music ===
==== Magazines ====
- The Wire (magazine), cover title Wire, a British music magazine, founded in 1982

==== Groups ====
- Wire (band), British punk/post-punk group (1976–present)

==== Albums ====
- Wire (Third Day album), a 2004 album by Third Day
- Wire (Wire album), a 2015 album by Wire
- Wires (album), a 2001 album by Art of Fighting

==== Songs ====
- "Wires" (song), by Athlete, 2004
- "The Wire" (David Dallas song), featuring Ruby Frost, 2013
- "The Wire" (Haim song), 2013
- "Wire", a song by U2 from their 1984 album The Unforgettable Fire
- "Wire", by Third Day from the album Wire, 2004
- "Wires", by Red Fang from the album Murder the Mountains, 2011
- "Wires", by The Neighbourhood, 2012

=== News sites ===
- The Wire (India), an Indian news website
- The Wire, a defunct website published by The Atlantic

=== Radio ===
- WIRE (FM), a radio station at 91.1 FM licensed to Lebanon, Indiana
- The Wire (radio program), an Australian current-affairs program
- The Wire, Gaylord College of Journalism and Mass Communication's student radio station
- WXNT, an Indianapolis, Indiana (1430 AM) radio station, which held the WIRE call sign from 1935 to 1989

=== Television ===
==== Channels ====
- Wire TV, a 1992–1995 UK cable television channel
- WIRE-CD, a television station (channel 33, virtual 33) licensed to serve Atlanta, Georgia, United States

==== Series ====
- The Wire, a 2002–2008 HBO police drama TV series

==== Episodes ====
- "The Wire" (Curb Your Enthusiasm), the sixth episode of Curb Your Enthusiasm
- "The Wire" (The Wire episode), the sixth episode of The Wire TV series
- "The Wire" (Star Trek: Deep Space Nine), an episode of Star Trek: Deep Space Nine

=== Other uses in media ===
- The Wire (JTF-GTMO), official weekly newspaper of Joint Task Force Guantanamo

== Computing and telecommunications ==
- Wire (software), an instant messaging application that supports voice and video calling
- Wide-coverage Internet Repeater Enhancement System (WIRES), a digital transmission mode used in Yaesu amateur radio equipment
- Wire data, data on the wire in a communications system or protocol
- Wire protocol, a method of transmitting data
- Wire Swiss, a software company headquartered in Switzerland that is best known for its messaging application of the same name

== Organizations ==
- NSW Wildlife Information Rescue and Education Service (WIRES), an animal welfare organisation in New South Wales, Australia
- The WIRE project, a charitable organisation in England

== Other uses ==
- Warrington Wolves, a British rugby league team nicknamed The Wire
- Wide Field Infrared Explorer (WIRE), a spacecraft intended to produce an infrared survey of the entire sky
- Winged Reusable Sounding rocket (WIRES), by Japan
- Wire Building, listed on the National Register of Historic Places in Washington, D.C.
- Wire of Death or "the Wire", a lethal electric fence on the Dutch-Belgian border during World War I
- "The wire", an elaborate obsolete con used in the film The Sting

== See also ==
- Wired (disambiguation)
- Barb wire (disambiguation)
- Barbed Wire (disambiguation)
- Endless Wire (disambiguation)
- Guide wire (disambiguation)
- High Wire (disambiguation)
- Wyre (disambiguation)
