= Barbie (disambiguation) =

Barbie is a fashion doll launched in 1959.

Barbie may also refer to:

== People ==
- Barbie is a diminutive for the given name Barbara

=== Given name ===
- Barbie Almalbis (born 1977), Filipina singer-songwriter
- Barbie Ferreira (born 1996), American actress
- Barbie Forteza (born 1997), Filipina television actress
- Barbie Hsu (1976–2025), Taiwanese actress
- Barbie Imperial (born 1998), Filipina actress
- Barbie Wilde (born 1960), Canadian actress and writer

=== Nickname ===
- La Barbie (born 1973), Mexican-American drug lord nicknamed "La Barbie"
- Kelly Kelly (born 1987), professional wrestler and model Barbara Jean "Barbie" Blank
- Barbie the Welder (fl. 2007–present), American metal sculptor Barbara Parsons

=== Surname ===
- Klaus Barbie (1913–1991), SS and Gestapo officer and war criminal

== Arts and entertainment ==
- Barbie (media franchise), starring and based on the eponymous fashion doll
  - Barbie (1984 video game), for the Commodore 64
  - Barbie (1991 video game), for PC and the Nintendo Entertainment System
  - Barbie (film), a 2023 live-action fantasy comedy
- "Barbie", a song by The Beach Boys from the 1991 album Lost & Found (1961–62)
- "Barbie" a 2023 song by D-Block Europe
- Barbie Doll (poem), a 1971 poem by Marge Piercy

== Slang ==
- Barbecue
- Barbecue grill
- Barbiturate
- Barbiturate overdose

== Other uses ==
- ZTF20abrbeie (nicknamed "Barbie"), a very energetic transient astronomical event

== See also ==
- Barbe (disambiguation)
- Barbee (disambiguation)
- Barbey (disambiguation)
- Barbi (disambiguation)
- Barby (disambiguation)
- Barb (disambiguation)
- Barbara (disambiguation)
- Barbecue (disambiguation)
- BBQ (disambiguation)
