= Barbe (disambiguation) =

Barbe may refer to:

== Places ==
- Île Barbe on the Saône, in Lyon, France
- Barbe Airport, Mopti, Mali

== People ==
- Barbe, a surname

== Other uses ==
- Barbe-class utility landing craft of the German Navy
- Alfred M. Barbe High School, Lake Charles, Louisiana, USA

== See also ==
- Barb wire (disambiguation)
- Barbes (disambiguation)
- Barbey (disambiguation)
- Barbee (disambiguation)
- Barbie (disambiguation)
- Barbi (disambiguation)
- Barby (disambiguation)
- Barb (disambiguation)
- Sainte-Barbe (disambiguation)
