= Valley Pike =

U.S. Route 11

Valley Pike or Valley Turnpike is the traditional name given for the Indian trail and roadway which is now approximated by U.S. Route 11 in the Shenandoah Valley of Virginia.

Long before the arrival of English colonists, Native Americans of the Delaware and Catawba tribes used this well-watered path as a migratory route and hunting grounds, moving between what is now Georgia and Canada. Beginning in the 1730s, Scots-Irish and German immigrants coming from Pennsylvania began to move up the valley and establish settlements (“Up the Valley” in this context refers to movement to higher elevation and indicates a southward direction). As a result of the Treaty of Lancaster, the Iroquois were promised a marked path up the Valley which was laid out in 1745 by James Patton and John Buchanan. Initially called the "Indian Road", it was later known as the "Great Wagon Road."

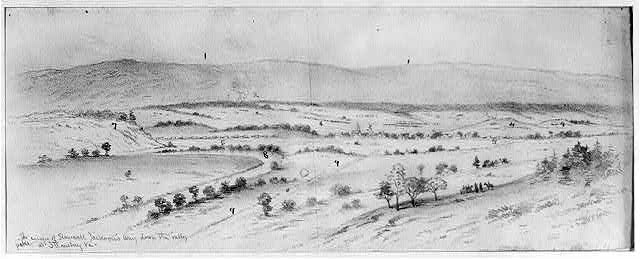
A drawing titled "the escape of Stonewall Jackson's Army down the valley pike at Strausburg [sic], Va." U.S. Library of Congress Collection

On March 3, 1834, The Valley Turnpike Company was incorporated by an act of the Virginia General Assembly, and the state participated in the public-private venture through the Virginia Board of Public Works with a 40% investment to build 68 miles (109 km) between Winchester and Harrisonburg. A similar road from Harrisonburg to Staunton was built by another company, and they merged. The new combined road, by then known as the "Valley Pike", was significantly improved and tolls were charged for the upkeep of its 93-mile (150 km) length. An official report made by General P. H. Sheridan published in July 1866 described the Valley Pike as follows: "The city of Martinsburg,... is on the Baltimore and Ohio Railroad, at the northern terminus of the Valley pike--a broad macadamized road, running up the valley, through Winchester, and terminating at Staunton."

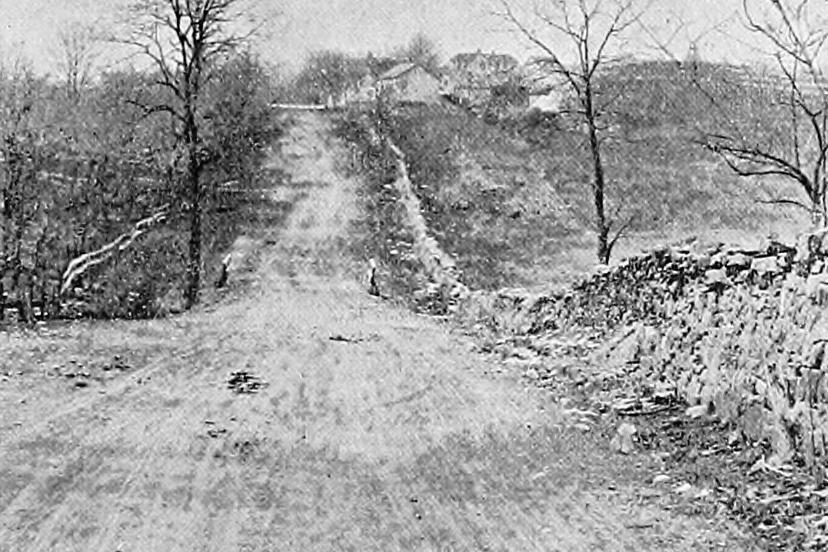
Valley Turnpike, 1897

During the American Civil War, the Valley Pike was a key transportation link in both Jackson's Valley Campaign of 1862 and the Valley Campaigns of 1864. The macadamized road enabled fast movement of heavy wagon trains and gun carriages even during rainy weather, when dirt roads turned into mud. Confederate General Stonewall Jackson marched his infantry soldiers—nicknamed foot cavalry—up and down the Valley and through various mountain gaps, such as Swift Run Gap and Thornton Gap, and make sudden appearances in front of Union troops in the Piedmont region on the east side of the Blue Ridge Mountains.

In 1918, The Valley Turnpike Company, which had been managed by a young Harry Flood Byrd, allowed the Valley Turnpike to be one of the first roads taken over by the state. It was designated as part of State Route 3, one of the routes of the state highway system managed by the State Highway Commission.

The Valley Turnpike was given the U.S. Route 11 designation in 1926, and remained the major north–south highway thoroughfare for the Shenandoah Valley until Interstate 81 was built beginning in the 1960s. Today, the road carries much local traffic, and provides an alternative to the busy Interstate Highway.

A section of the original Valley Pike runs parallel to U.S. Route 11 in Rockbridge County, 1 mile north of Lexington.

== See also ==
- Winchester and Martinsburg Turnpike, Winchester north to Martinsburg
- Junction Valley Turnpike, Staunton south to Buchanan
- Staunton-Parkersburg Turnpike, Staunton west to Parkersburg on the Ohio River
