= Wired =

Wired may refer to:

== Arts, entertainment, and media ==
=== Music ===
- Wired (Jeff Beck album), 1976
- Wired (Hugh Cornwell album), 1993
- Wired (Mallory Knox album), 2017
- WIRED (Basement album), 2026
- "Wired", a song by Prism from their album Beat Street
- "Wired", a song by Sevendust from their eponymous debut album
- "Wired", a song by Nebula from their 2006 album Apollo

=== Television ===
- Wired (TV series), a 2008 British television miniseries
- Wired, 1988 TV series produced by Tim Graham
- "Wired", a 2005 two-part episode of Power Rangers: SPD
- "Wired", a 2002 two-part episode of The Zeta Project animated series

=== Other uses in arts, entertainment, and media ===
- Wired (book), a 1984 book by Bob Woodward about the American actor and comedian John Belushi
  - Wired (film), a 1989 adaptation of the book by Bob Woodward
- Wired (novel), a 2005 science fiction novel by Douglas E. Richards about a brilliant genetic engineer who discovers how to temporarily achieve savant-like capabilities.
- Wired (magazine), an American science and technology magazine and website
  - Wired UK, the UK offshoot of the American magazine
  - Wired (rivista italiana), the Italian version of the American magazine
- WTDY-FM, formerly known as "Wired 96.5", a radio station at 96.5 FM licensed to Philadelphia, Pennsylvania

== Other uses ==
- Wired (demoparty), a Belgian annual demoparty which ran from 1994 to 1998
- Wired, an energy drink containing caffeine and taurine
- Wired, a slang term for being under the influence of caffeine
- Wired communication, the transmission of data over a wire-based communication technology
- Workforce Innovation in Regional Economic Development (WIRED), a branch of the United States Department of Labor

== See also ==
- Wire (disambiguation)
