= Andrew Russell Barbee Jr. =

American politician

- Born: December 9, 1827; Hawsburg, Rappahannock County, Virginia, U.S.
- Died: August 5, 1903 (aged 75); Pruntytown, West Virginia, U.S.
- Burial place: Lone Oak Cemetery; Point Pleasant, West Virginia, U.S.
- Military career
- Allegiance: Confederate States of America
- Branch: Confederate States Army
- Service years: 1861-1863
- Rank: Colonel
- Conflicts: American Civil War

Andrew Russell Barbee Jr. (December 9, 1827 – August 5, 1903) was a surgeon in the Confederate service during the American Civil War. He was president of the U. S. Board of Pension Examiners, and secretary of the State Board of Health. While a member of the West Virginia Senate, he was the author of the bill regulating the practice of medicine and surgery, and that creating the State Board of Health.

== Early years ==
The family descends from the French-Huguenot John Barbee who settled in Virginia. Barbee was born in Hawsburg (or Hawburg), Rappahannock County, Virginia. He was one of eleven children of Andrew Russell Barbee Sr. (alternate: Andrew Russel Barbee Sr.) of French and Welsh descent, and Nancy (née Britton) Barbee, of Irish and German descent. Andrew Sr. operated a toll road through Thornton Gap; the family resided at a lodge at the edge of the road. His siblings included brothers George (b. 1811), Ely (b. 1812), Col. Gabriel Thomas (1814–1908), the sculptor William Randolph (1818–1868), Lewis Conner (1821–1877), and Joseph (b. 1832); and sisters Eliza Annie (b. 1813), Ellen (b. 1815), Mary (b. 1823), Martha (b. 1828), Laurina Caroline (b. 1829), and Adaline Catherine (b. 1831). Barbee was the nephew of General Patrick Henry Brittan, 10th Secretary of State of Alabama.

Barbee had been a tanner by trade. He was educated at Petersburg, Virginia before studying medicine under Dr. J. J. Thompson of Luray, Virginia (1848-1849) at the University of Pennsylvania, and at Richmond Medical College (1849–1850), before graduating M. D. in April, 1851 from the University of Pennsylvania School of Medicine.

== Career ==
He began his early medical practice at Flint Hill, Rappahannock County, Virginia, before moving to Criglersville, Madison County, Virginia in 1852. Afterwards, he went to planting and farming at Poca, West Virginia, where he remained until the Civil War broke out. His practice was general medicine, but he has devoted himself particularly to surgery and chronic diseases.

Although opposed to the principle or practice of secession, duty as a Virginian impelled Barbee to enter the Confederate army, referring to himself as a "protectionist," and by no means a "civil service reformer." In 1859, during the excitement of the John Brown's raid on Harpers Ferry, he organized a volunteer company of militia under the laws of the state of Virginia, and when the state seceded in 1861, the company enlisted in the Confederate service as Company A of the Twenty-second Virginia Regiment, and he commanded it as captain. He fought in the Kanawha valley campaign. On May 2, 1862, Barbee was promoted to lieutenant-colonel of the same regiment and served in that capacity until retired for disability, he having been wounded in the battle of Dry Creek, August 26, 1863. When recovered of his wounds in January 1864, he retired from active service.

He was subsequently assigned to duty in the medical department of the Confederate army (with the rank of colonel), on the staff of Gen. John C. Breckinridge in a medico-military capacity, serving with him in the valley in 1864. When Breckinridge was called to another department, Barbee was left colonel commanding, and chief medical officer. At a still later date, Barbee was assigned to the medical charge of the Virginia reserve forces of Southwest Virginia, and was in all the battles of that department. He retained this position till the surrender of Lee, at the Appomattox Court House.

At the close of the war, Barbee located at Buffalo, West Virginia, later removing to Point Pleasant, West Virginia, and continuing the practice of the physician and surgeon. He was a member of the State Senate in 1880-1884, serving one term of four years, at the end of which he was a candidate for Congress on the Republican ticket. Though twice a nominee for Congress, he was defeated both times.

Barbee was a member of the Mason County Medical Association, Gallia County Medical Association, and of the Ohio Valley Medical Association. Also a member of the West Virginia State Medical Association, he was elected its president in 1875. He held office as president and trustee of boards of education and other public bodies.

== Personal life ==
He married, on May 18, 1852, Margaret Ann Gillespie (b. 1834), daughter of Dr. John J. and Ann (Arthur) Thompson. The Barbee's children included John, Mary Blanche, Kate Louise, William, Ann Rebecca, and Hugh Arthur. He lived in Point Pleasant, West Virginia.

Barbee died on August 5, 1903, at the home of his daughter in Pruntytown, West Virginia. He was buried in Lone Oak Cemetery in Point Pleasant.
