= Barbi =

Barbi may refer to:

- Barbi (name), including a list of people with the name
- Barbi trilogy, three Philippine comedy films, including Run Barbi Run, 1995
- Carrozzeria Barbi, an Italian bus manufacturer

== See also ==
- Barbie (disambiguation)
- Barbee (disambiguation)
- Barbey (disambiguation)
- Barby (disambiguation)
- Barbe (disambiguation)
