= Barbes =

Barbes or Barbès or variation may refer to:

== Barbes ==
- A festival in Latvian mythology

== Barbeş ==
- Barbeş, a village in Greece merged into the town of Vergina

== Barbès ==
People

- Armand Barbès, French Republican revolutionary
- Charles-Noël Barbès (1914–2008), Canadian politician and lawyer

Places

- Boulevard Barbès, boulevard in the 18th arrondissement of Paris
- Barbès–Rochechouart station, a Paris Metro station
- Barbès (Brooklyn), a bar in the Park Slope neighborhood of Brooklyn, New York

Music

- Barbès (album), debut solo album of Rachid Taha

== See also ==
- Barb (disambiguation)
- Barbe (disambiguation)
