= Barby =

Barby may refer to:

- Barby, Ardennes, a village in Grand Est, France
- Barby, Germany, a town in Saxony-Anhalt
- Barby, Northamptonshire, a village in England
- Barby, Savoie, a village in Auvergne-Rhône-Alpes, France
- Bärby, a locality in Uppsala County, Sweden
- Barbecue

== See also ==
- Barbey (disambiguation)
- Barbee (disambiguation)
- Barbie (disambiguation)
- Barbi (disambiguation)
- Barbe (disambiguation)
