= Sainte-Barbe =

Sainte Barbe is French for Saint Barbara.

Sainte-Barbe or variations may refer to:

== Places ==
=== France ===
- Sainte-Barbe, Moselle, in the Moselle département
- Sainte-Barbe, Vosges, in the Vosges département
- Sainte-Barbe-sur-Gaillon, in the Eure département

=== Canada ===
- Sainte-Barbe, Quebec
- St. Barbe, Newfoundland and Labrador

== People ==
- Sir John St Barbe, 1st Baronet (1655-1723)
- John St Barbe (1742-1816) was a prominent English shipbroker and shipowner
- Richard St. Barbe Baker (1889-1992) British forester
- Ursula St Barbe (died 1602), lady at the court of Queen Elizabeth I of England.
- William de Ste Barbe (died 1152) Bishop of Durham, from Saint-Barbe-en-Auge

== Other uses ==
- Collège Sainte-Barbe, a former school in Paris, France
- Sainte-Barbe Library, Paris, France
- St Barbe Museum & Art Gallery, Lymington, UK
- Saint-Barbe-en-Auge, a priory in Normandy, France

== See also ==
- Île Barbe on the Saône, in Lyon, France
- Barbe (disambiguation)
- Barb (disambiguation)
- St. Barb's, a town in Trinidad
