= Wyre =

Wyre may refer to:

== Places ==
- Wyre, Orkney, an island in Scotland
- Borough of Wyre, a local government district in Lancashire, England
  - Wyre (UK Parliament constituency)
- River Wyre, a river in Lancashire, England
- Wyre Forest, a woodland in Shropshire and Worcestershire, England
- Wyre Forest District, a local government district in Worcestershire, England
- Wyre Piddle, a village in Worcestershire
- Afon Wyre (Welsh for River Wyre), a river in Ceredigion, Wales

== Radio stations ==
- WYRE (AM), a radio station in Annapolis, Maryland, United States
- WYRE-FM or WBHU, a radio station licensed to serve St. Augustine Beach, Florida, United States
- WWNL, formerly WYRE, a radio station in Pittsburgh, Pennsylvania, United States
- The Wyre, a former radio station serving north Worcestershire, England

== People ==
- Wyre (musician), Kenyan musician
- John Wyre, Canadian percussionist
- Wyre Davies, Welsh journalist

== Other uses ==
- Wyre (comics), a fictional character featured in the publications of Marvel Comics

== See also ==
- Wire (disambiguation)
