= Barbey =

Barbey may refer to:

== Places ==
- Barbey, Seine-et-Marne, a commune in France

== People ==
- Aron K. Barbey (born 1977), American neuroscientist
- Bruno Barbey (1941–2020), French photographer
- Daniel E. Barbey (1889–1969), United States Navy officer
- Jules Amédée Barbey d'Aurevilly (1808–1889), French novelist
- Michel Barbey (1927–2026), French actor
- Peter Barbey (born 1957/8), American publisher
- William Barbey (1842-1914), Swiss botanist and politician

== See also ==
- Barbee (disambiguation)
- Barbie (disambiguation)
- Barbi (disambiguation)
- Barby (disambiguation)
- Barbe (disambiguation)
