= Barb Wire =

Barb Wire may refer to:

- Barb wire, a fencing material
- Barb Wire (character), a comic book superhero published by Dark Horse Comics
- Barb Wire (1996 film), starring Pamela Anderson, based on the comic book
- Barb Wire (pinball), pinball machine based on the 1996 film
- Barb Wire (soundtrack), soundtrack album of the 1996 film
- Barb Wire (1922 film), an American silent film starring Jack Hoxie

== See also ==
- Barbwire Bowl Classic, an American football game
- Barbed Wire (disambiguation)
- Barbed tape, aka razorwire
- Barb (disambiguation)
- Wire (disambiguation)
