= Barbecue (disambiguation) =

Barbecue is a method and apparatus for cooking meat, poultry and occasionally fish with the heat and hot smoke of a fire, smoking wood, or hot coals of charcoal.

Barbecue may also refer to:

== Food preparation ==
- Barbecue grill
- Barbecue sauce

== Places ==
- Barbecue Township, Harnett County, North Carolina, U.S.
  - Barbecue, North Carolina, an unincorporated community in Barbecue Township

== Arts, entertainment, and media ==
- Barbecue (film), a 2014 French film
- Barbecue (G.I. Joe), a fictional character in the G.I. Joe universe

== People ==
- Jimmy Chérizier (born 1977), known by his pseudonym Barbecue, a Haitian gang leader
- BBQ, a pseudonym for one-man band Mark Sultan (born 1973)

== Military equipment ==
- Anti-drone mesh, commonly nicknamed "Barbecues"

== See also ==
- BabaKiueria, a 1986 Australian satirical film
- BBQ (disambiguation)
