= Guide wire =

A guide wire may refer to:

- A step in the Seldinger technique
- Guide Wire, a character in the anime series Rave Master
- Guidewire Software

== See also ==
- Guy-wire, a tensioned cable providing structural support, sometimes incorrectly called "guide wire"
