= Endless Wire =

Endless Wire may refer to:

- Endless Wire (The Who album), or the title song
- Endless Wire (Gordon Lightfoot album), or the title song
