= Herbert Barbee =

American sculptor (1848–1936)

- Born: October 8, 1848; Luray, Virginia, US
- Died: March 22, 1936 (aged 87); Centreville, Virginia, US
- Occupation: sculptor
- Notable work: Confederate Heroes Monument
- Father: William Randolph Barbee

Herbert Barbee (October 8, 1848 – March 22, 1936) was an American sculptor from Luray, Virginia. He was the son of William Randolph Barbee, also a renowned sculptor, with whom he studied in Florence, Italy for some time. He lived for much of his life in his home county, where he had something of a reputation as an eccentric, and where he was not respected by many of the locals due to his propensity for carving nude figures. At one time he also kept a studio in New York, and in 1887 and 1888 he was active in Cincinnati. During his career he also worked in Washington, D.C., Baltimore, and St. Louis. Eventually he opened a studio in Hamburg, Virginia, not far from his birthplace.

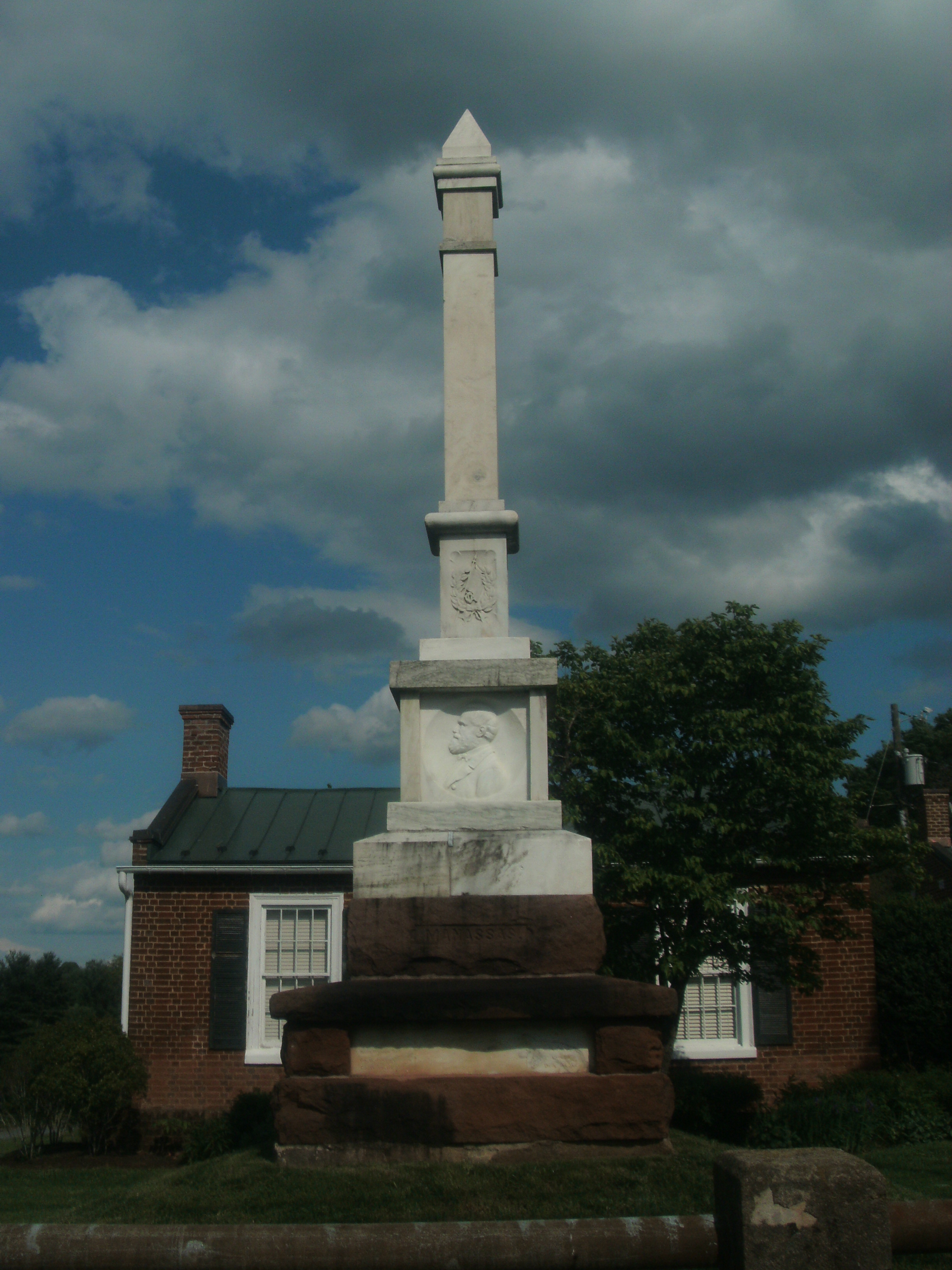
Barbee created the monument to Confederate soldiers of Rappahannock County that today stands on the courthouse lawn in Washington, Virginia

In addition to his own work, Barbee completed several pieces which had been left unfinished by his father at the time of his death, and also carved marble pieces after a number of his father's clay models; one of these, The Star of the West, received a gold medal at the Southern Exposition of 1883. He erected a bust of William, looking up at Mary's Rock, at the old family cemetery in Thornton Gap; placed there in 1930, after the elder Barbee's remains had been moved to a cemetery in Luray, this was removed sometime after the construction of Skyline Drive through the area. It was intended that it should be paired with a bust of Herbert's mother, looking down on her husband from the Rock, but that piece was never completed.

Barbee married, on February 20, 1895, Blanche E. Stover of Luray. With her he had four children: Herbert Randolph, Aurelia Loreta, Mary Frances, and William Clifford. Barbee lived at a house called "Calendine", which had been erected in the 1850s to serve as a general store and stage stop along the Sperryville-New Market turnpike; he used the former store area as his studio. He is buried at the Stover Cemetery in Luray. "Calendine" still stands; it is denoted by a historic marker erected by the Page County Historical Society, which purchased the building in 1968 and which today operates the house as a museum.

== Work ==
Confederate Heroes Monument in Luray, Virginia

Barbee's most notable work is a memorial to the Confederacy in Luray, erected in 1898; called the "Confederate Heroes Monument", or sometimes "Barbee's Monument", its erection is said to have been inspired by a visit to the battlefield at Gettysburg, although the more immediate reason for its creation was as the focal point of a proposed park, called Henkel Woods Park, whose construction was never completed. Its design is said to have been based on the memory of a sentry Barbee saw standing on the mountain above Thornton Gap one winter's day during the Civil War. The statue is the earlier of two Confederate memorials in Luray, the newer one being erected in 1912. A variety of reasons have been given for the creation of the new statue, including suggestions that the original was disgraceful to the memory of the dead, depicting as it did a soldier in tattered clothing; that the original statue did not face "defiantly north" and so was unacceptable; that the first statue was too far beyond the town's limits to be acceptable; and that Barbee's reputation tainted his work, and so a "purer" representation was needed as a memorial. Even so, one author said of him, "Herbert Barbee made stone speak as life. He left us a marble monument that endures today, an honor to Luray, Page County and Virginia."

Barbee also crafted monuments to the Confederacy in Warrenton and Washington, Virginia. The latter was commissioned in 1900, although the date at which it was actually constructed is unknown; the former, a red obelisk which sits on the green just north of the old jail, was unveiled in 1920, and includes as part of its design a bas relief portrait of John Singleton Mosby.

== See also ==
- Moses Jacob Ezekiel
