= Barbie the Welder =

21st-century American metal sculptor

- Born: Barbara Parsons
- Known for: metal sculptor
- Website: https://www.barbiethewelder.com/

Barbara Parsons, known professionally as Barbie the Welder, is an American metal sculptor. Her work achieved prominence after being publicised on social media. She has produced sculptures for a number of significant clients, and run welding exhibitions at trade fairs.

== Life and career ==
From Elmira, New York, Barbie was influenced by her father, a self-described jack of all trades from whom she learned about drywall fitting, roofing, and electrical installations. She was inspired to take up welding after seeing a character in the film Cast Away weld wings onto an angel sculpture.

She started her career in 2007, saving $1,200 to attend a local BOCES welding program. She was subsequently hired at Cameron Manufacturing and Design, where she worked as a sheet metal fabricator. After working for five years to learn the art of welding and fabrication and earning her Journeyman in sheet metal and iron plate, she quit in September 2014 to work as an independent artist.

After nine months of no sales, she took up demonstrations and exhibitions as a way to provide income. Although reluctant to do this, she realized it raised interest in her work and had similar attention to people working with chainsaw sculpture. Her work became popular when she published it on Instagram. She has since created sculptures for a number of clients, and has a YouTube channel explaining welding art. In 2017, she signed a deal with Skyhorse Publishing, who asked her to write a book on 30 different welding projects.

In January 2022, Barbie created a self-portrait sculpture title Rise Up, which depicts her as being a phoenix. A documentary about this particular sculpture is currently in production.

Her art is self-taught. Not all of her projects have worked, and she has encouraged others to experiment and learn from mistakes. She is known for her Gothic and creature designs.

As inspirations in the welding industry, she cites Jessi Combs, April Wilkerson, and Cynthia Gauthier.

=== Installations ===
Barbie has created sculptures for various corporations such as Harley-Davidson. She has given live exhibitions of welding at events including the Sturgis Motorcycle Rally, Americade, and SEMA, including demonstrations of new welding equipment and technology.

== Publications ==
- (2017) Horseshoe Crafts; More Than 30 Easy Projects You Can Weld At Home, ISBN 9781631581465
- (2018) The Inspiration Blueprint; How To Design And Create Your Inspired Life
- (2018) How To Weld Scrap Metal Art; 30 Easy Welding Projects You Can Make At Home, ISBN 978-1647647933
