= Lamb Barbee =

American baseball player

- Outfielder
- Born: April 30, 1916; Durham, North Carolina, U.S.
- Died: August 22, 1986 (aged 70); Durham, North Carolina, U.S.

Negro league baseball debut
- 1945, for the Cincinnati Clowns

Last appearance
- 1945, for the Cincinnati Clowns
- Stats at Baseball Reference

Teams
- Cincinnati Clowns (1945)

Walter Bradsher Barbee Jr. (April 30, 1916 – August 22, 1986), nicknamed "Lamb", was an American Negro league outfielder in the 1940s.

A native of Durham, North Carolina, Barbee was the brother of fellow Negro leaguer Bud Barbee. The brothers played together for the Cincinnati Clowns in 1945, Lamb's only professional season on record. Barbee died in Durham in 1986 at age 70.
