= Douglas E. Richards =

American novelist

Douglas E. Richards (born May 7, 1962) is an American writer, primarily of science fiction and both nonfiction and fiction for children.

== Biography ==
Richards grew up in Cincinnati, Ohio. He graduated from Finneytown High School, in Ohio, in 1980. He obtained a B.S. in microbiology from Ohio State University before getting a master's degree in molecular biology from the University of Wisconsin and an MBA from the University of Chicago. He was also a former Director of Biotechnology Licensing at Bristol Myers Squibb and a former biotechnology executive. He currently lives in San Diego, California, with his wife and two children.

George Noory wrote, "Douglas E. Richards has been widely praised for his ability to weave action, suspense, and science into riveting novels that brilliantly straddle the thriller and science fiction genres."

== Publications ==
=== Wired Series ===
1. Wired (2011) Paragon Press. ISBN 978-0982618493 Techno-thriller (#13 on The New York Times Best Seller list for fiction on November 6, 2011. Also, 5 weeks on the USA Today Best Seller list.)
2. Amped (2012) Paragon Press. ISBN 978-0982618493

=== Nick Hall Series ===
1. Mind's Eye (2014) Paragon Press. ISBN 978-0615953946
2. BrainWeb (2015) Paragon Press. ISBN 978-1508519713
3. Mind War (2016) Paragon Press. ISBN 1539616916

=== Split Second Series ===
- Split Second (2015) Paragon Press. ISBN 978-1517153151 (#17 Amazon Best Seller as of August, 2017.)
- Time Frame (2018) Paragon Press. ISBN 1983706574

=== Alien Artifact Series ===
- The Enigma Cube (2020) Paragon Press. ISBN 979-8600753341
- A Pivot In Time (2020) Paragon Press. ISBN 979-8657516944

=== The Rift Trilogy ===
Collaboration with Joshua T. Calvert

- The Rift (2025) Independently published. ISBN 979-8308990307
- The Rift 2 (2025) Independently published. ISBN 979-8311243360
- The Rift 3 (2025) Independently published. ISBN 979-8313206318

=== Other books ===
- The Cure (2013) Tor/Forge. ASIN: B00CQY7SBW; ISBN 9780765374103
- Quantum Lens (2014) Paragon Press. ISBN 978-0692282342
- Game Changer (2016) Paragon Press. ISBN 978-1530946006
- Infinity Born (2017) Paragon Press. ISBN 1546406395
- Seeker (2018) Paragon Press. ISBN 978-1720936336
- Veracity (2019) Paragon Press. ISBN 978-1796233858
- Oracle (2019) Paragon Press. ISBN 978-1079343427
- Unidentified (2021) Paragon Press. ISBN 979-8495442757
- The Breakthrough Effect (2023) Independently published. ISBN 979-8859904433

=== Young adult fiction ===
- The Devil's Sword (2010) Paragon Press. ISBN 978-0982618431
- Out of This World (2012) Paragon Press. ISBN 978-0985350345

==== The Prometheus Project ====
1. Trapped (2004) Paragon Press. E-book ASIN: B007ET4K7Y; Other:ISBN 978-0-9826184-1-7
2. Captured (2012) Paragon Press. ISBN 0982618425
3. Stranded (2012) Paragon Press. ISBN 0982618409

== Private Imprint ==
- Paragon Press is Douglas E. Richard's private imprint. Many items from Paragon Press are also available in paper editions from CreateSpace, and audible editions from Audible.com.
