= Barb pigeon =

Breed of pigeon

Barb
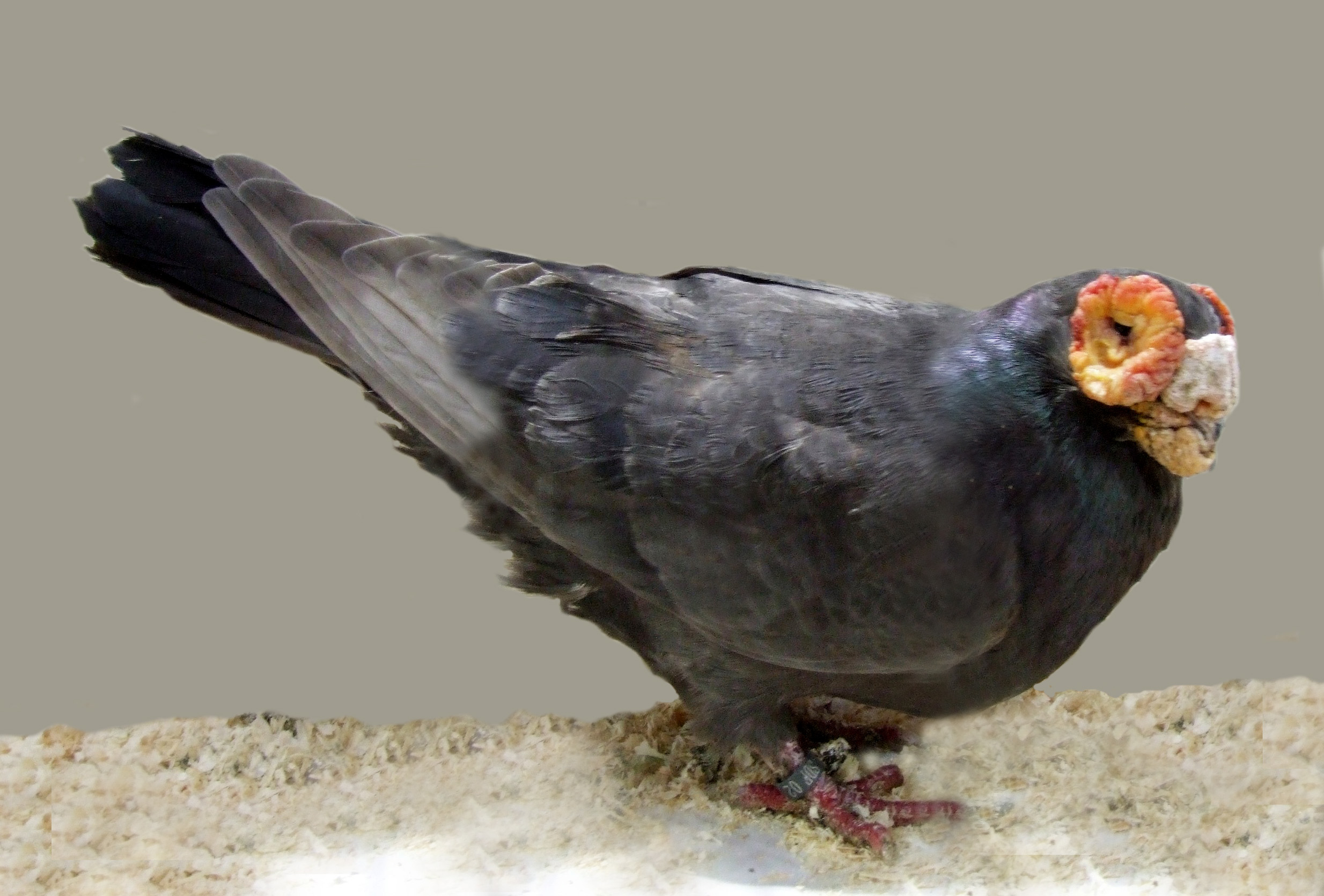
- Black Self Barb Pigeon
- Conservation status: Common

Classification
- US Breed Group: Fancy

Notes
- A very old breed of domesticated pigeon which was extant in Shakespeare's day.

The Barb (also called the English Barb) is a breed of fancy pigeon developed over many years of selective breeding. Barbs, along with other varieties of domesticated pigeons, are all descendants of the rock pigeon (a livia). This breed was referred to by Shakespeare. It was also referred to with an illustration in Charles Darwin's Variation of Animals and Plants under Domestication. It has been marked as cruel by many organisations due to the size of its beak which means it has trouble feeding its young and surviving.

== Gallery ==
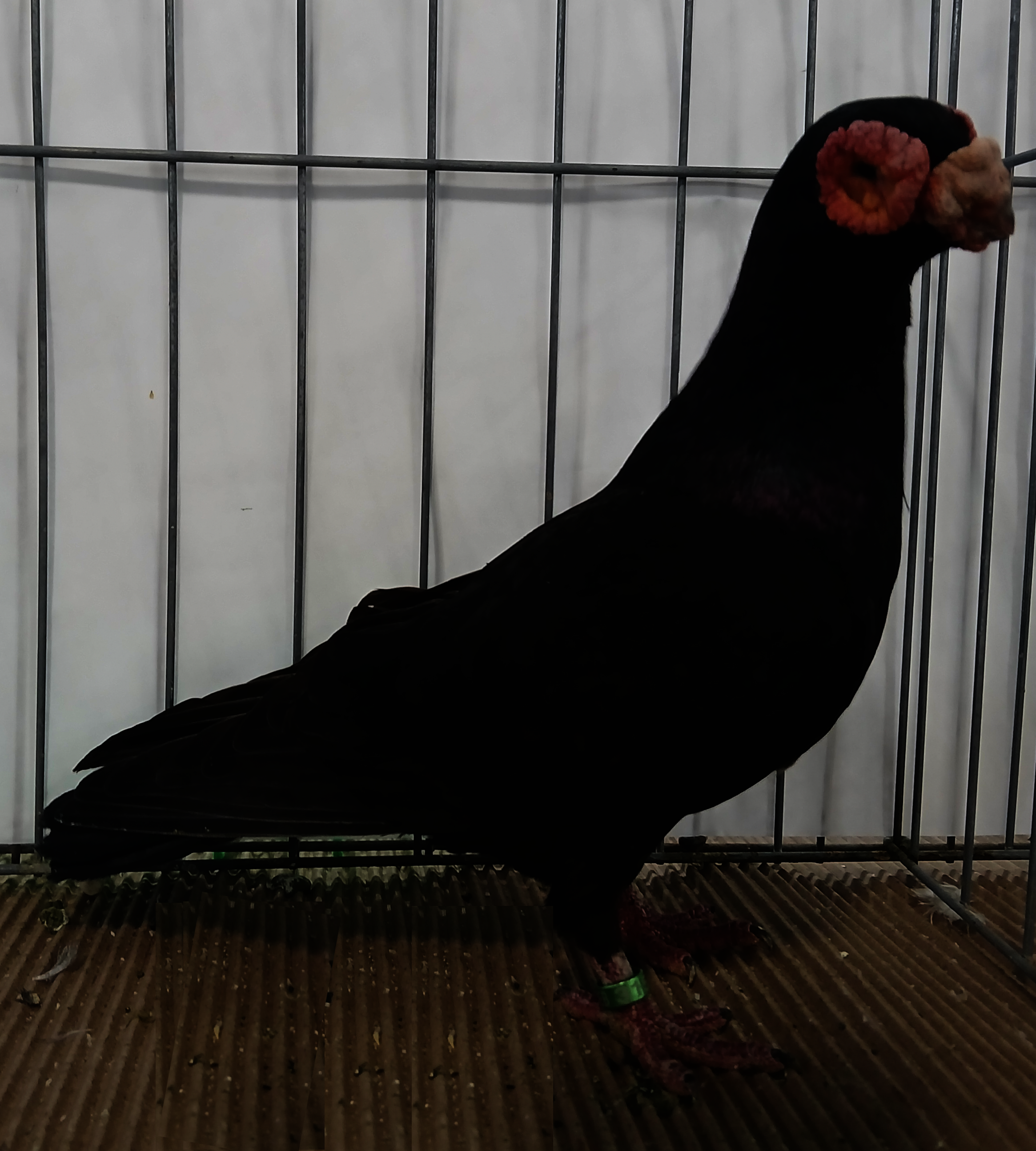
Black

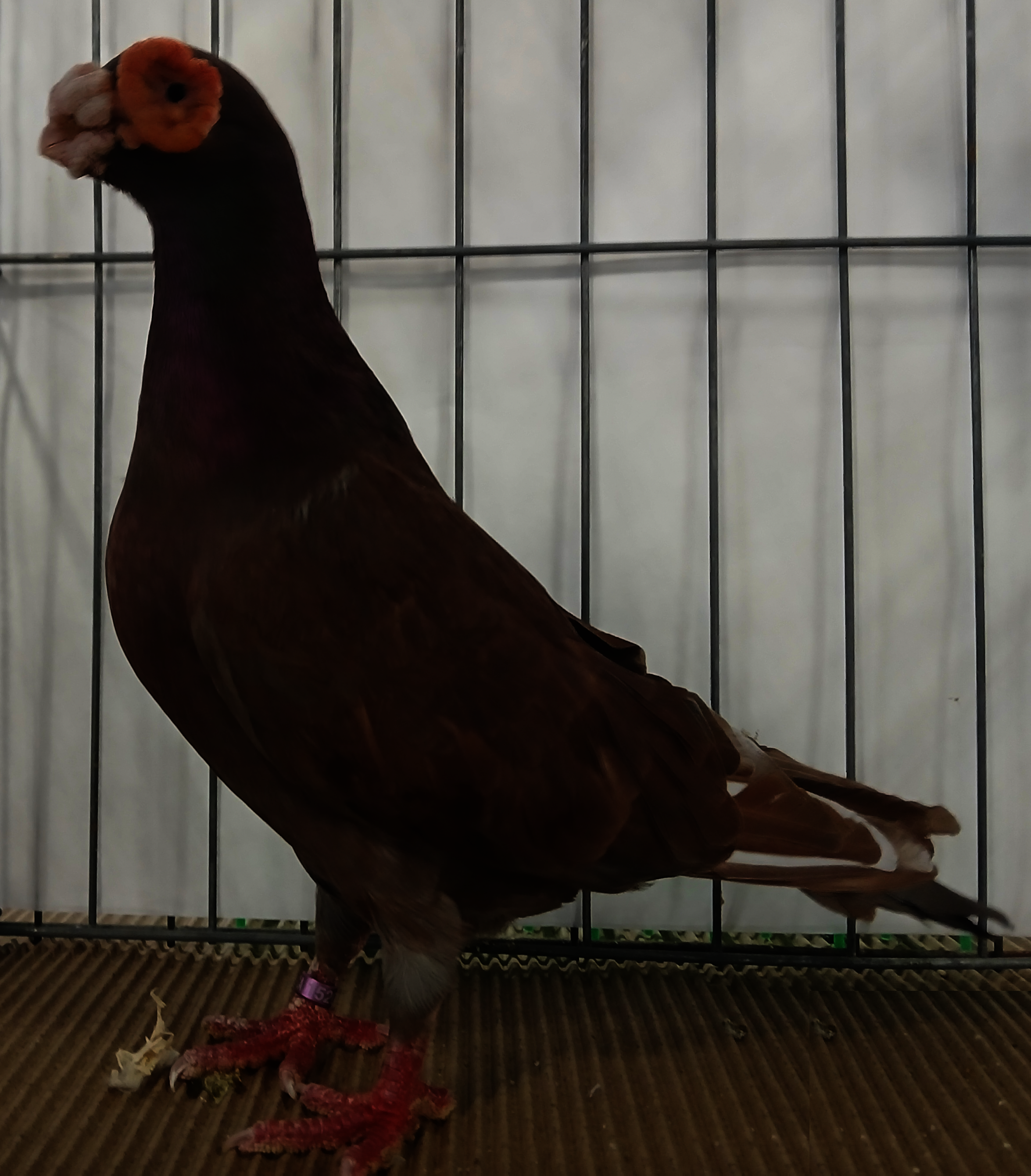
Red

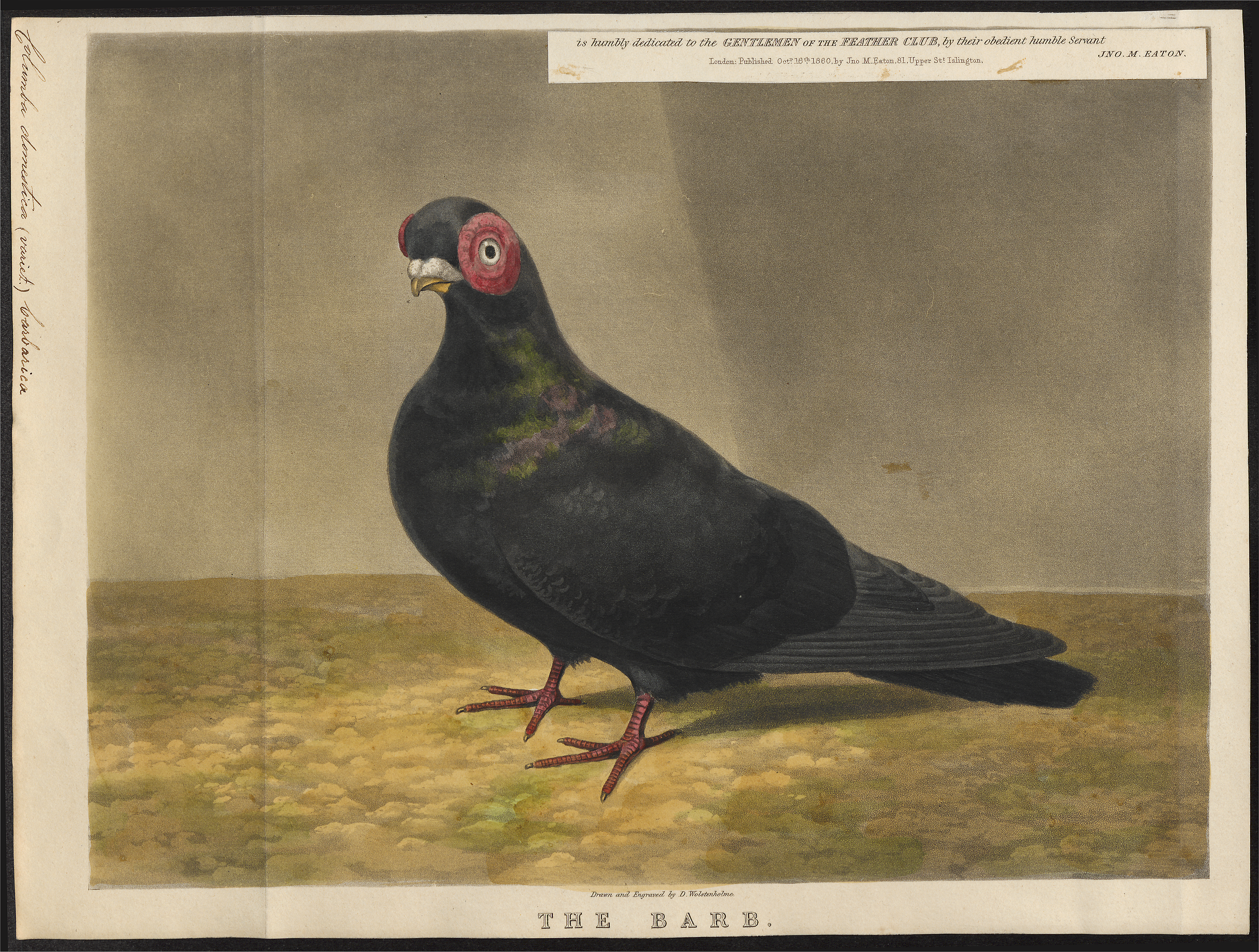
Collections University of Amsterdam

== See also ==
- Pigeon Diet
- Pigeon Housing
- List of pigeon breeds
