= The WIRE project =

The Wire Project logo

The Wire Project (Wick Information Recreation & Education) was a charitable organisation charity based in England.

== History ==
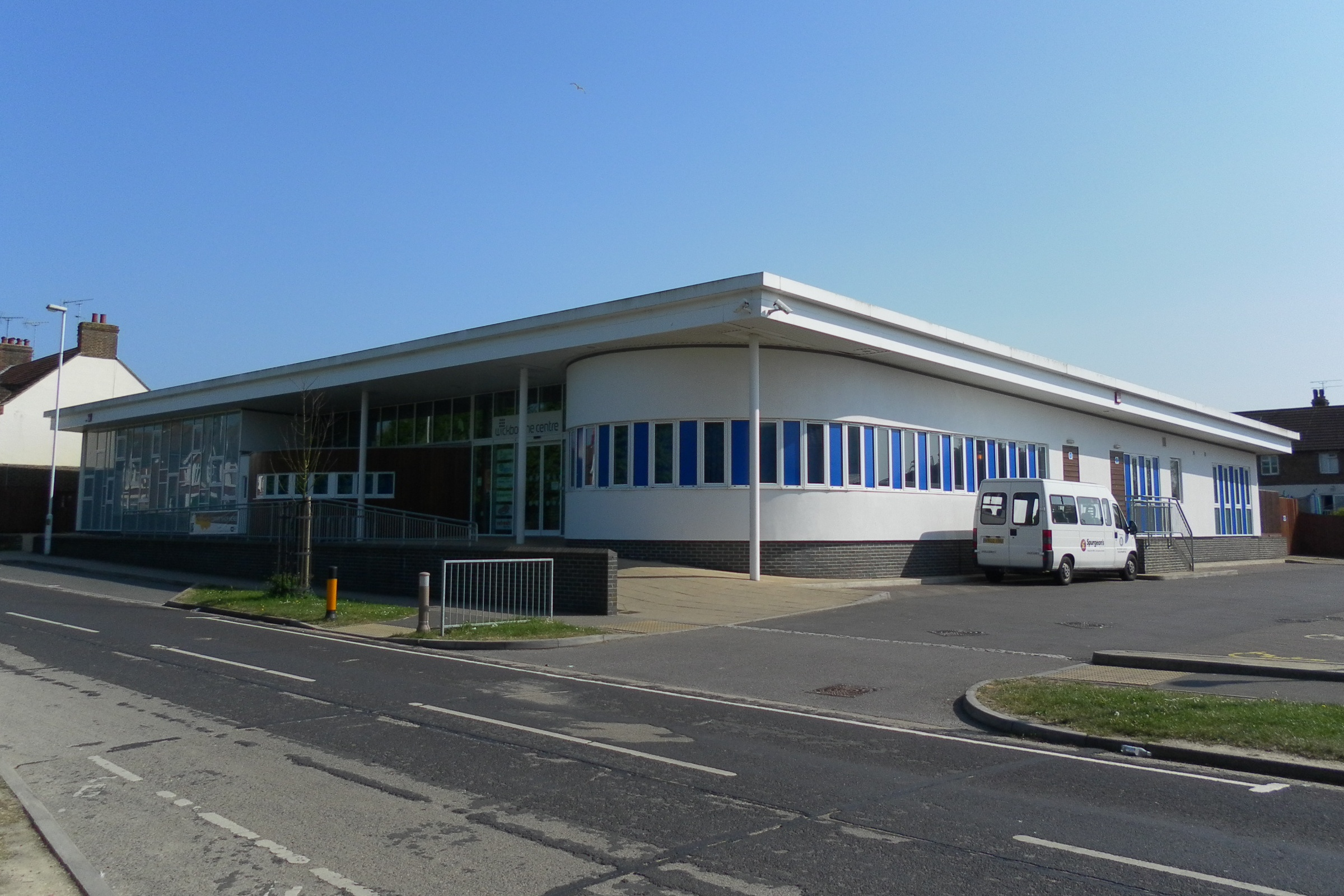
The Wickbourne Centre, on the site of the former Wickbourne Chapel

The Wire Project was founded by Paul Sanderson in 1996 as a direct response to recognised issues involving drug and alcohol addiction, high teenage pregnancy, low literacy levels and low ‘community esteem’ in the community of Wick, Littlehampton, West Sussex.

The WIRE was part of Spurgeon's, a children's charity who provided the managerial, administrative and financial backbone to The WIRE's work. Together with the locally formed UnderWIRE Advisory Group, The WIRE gained long-term stability and support to help strengthen the foundations of the project.

Other support came from The Salvation Army, The Rank Foundation and The Body Shop Foundation.

The project was so successful that similar projects were set up around the country, including Crawley, Portslade near Brighton, Bognor Regis and Oxford.

The WIRE was based in two different locations. In 1996 it was in a port-a-cabin on the car park of the then Wickbourne Chapel. When the new Wickbourne centre opened in 2005 half the team moved from the temporary office that became their permanent office at Flora McDonald Junior School.

In July 2006 Paul Sanderson was awarded an MBE for his work with this and other similar projects. In 2007 The WIRE Project came to an end due to funding changes. It was followed by LA-UK that continued to support young people in the area until it to was closed in 2012.

The spirit of The WIRE project lives on through various organisations such as The Wickbourne Centre, Sure Start and West Sussex County Council.
