= Foot cavalry =

Term describing infantry under the command of Stonewall Jackson

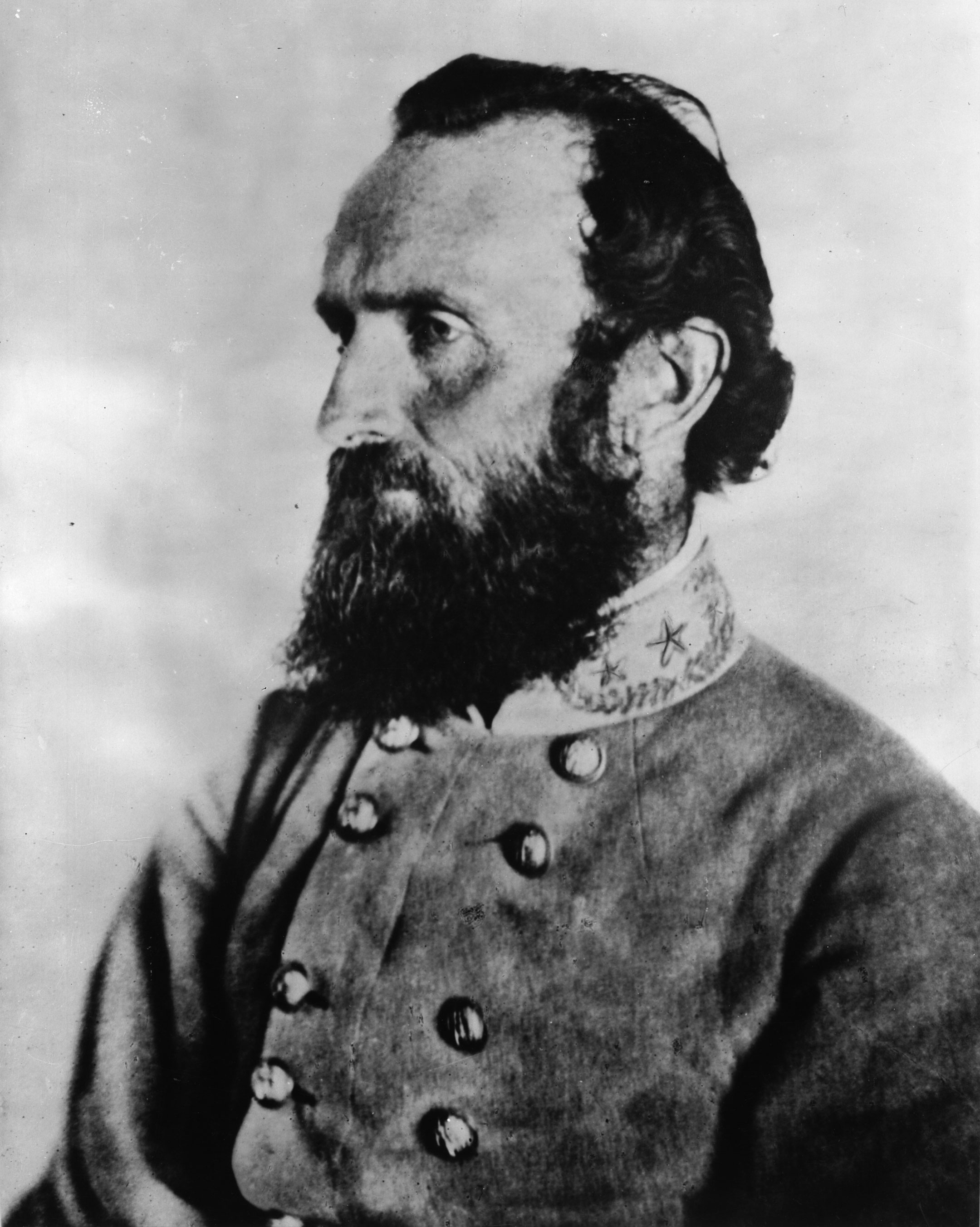
Stonewall Jackson

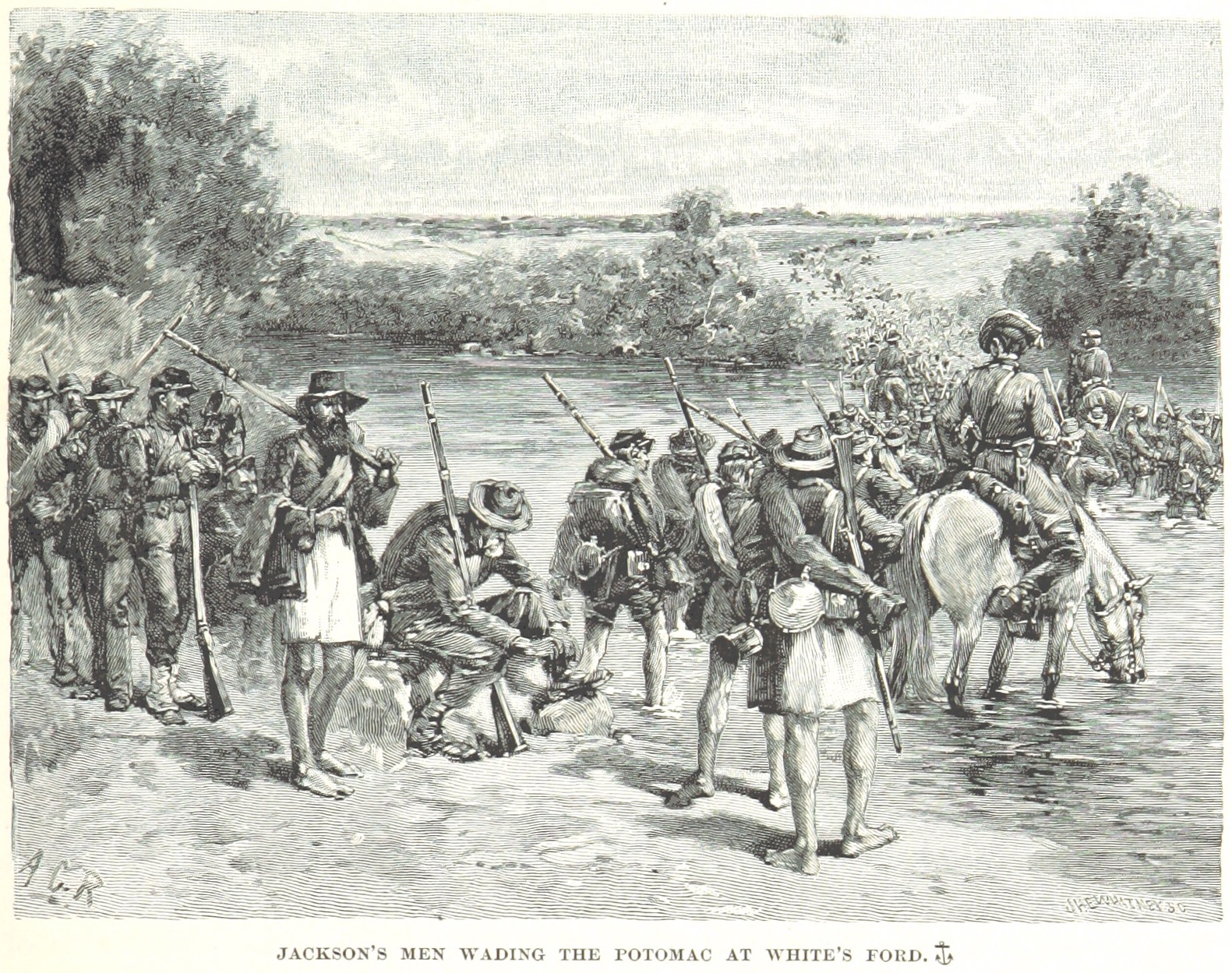
Jackson's men wading the Potomac, by Allen C. Redwood

Foot cavalry was an oxymoron coined by the media to describe the rapid movements of infantry troops serving under Confederate General Thomas Jonathan "Stonewall" Jackson during the American Civil War. Jackson's men marched on foot but they were able to cover long distances day after day to surprise the enemy.

== Origin ==
Cavalry units during the Civil War practiced the so-called foot cavalry drills. The media started to apply the phrase foot cavalry to Jackson's men starting from 1862. This was after Jackson's successful Shenandoah Valley campaign, in which Jackson usually surprised his Union opponents by completing much faster operational maneuvers.

On July 26, 1862, The Evening Star published the following,

Stonewall Jackson is now the idol of the army and the people. His soldiers are proud of the name "Jackson's Foot Cavalry."

On September 10, 1862, The National Republican wrote,

Ancient Israel was invaded by confederate nations from the east much as Stonewall Jackson is invading the country north of the Potomac! ... instead of being "bagged," he, with his "foot cavalry," will recross the Potomac—horse, foot, and dragoons.

== In action ==
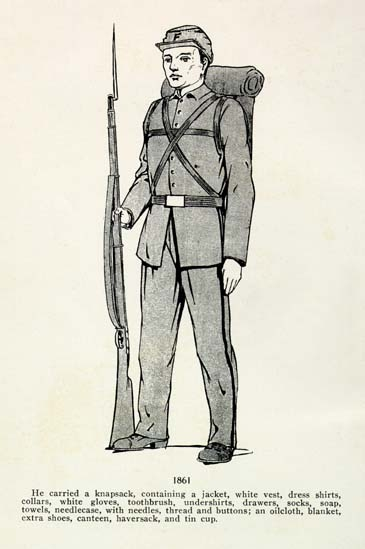
One of Jackson's foot cavalry

It was said of Jackson's foot cavalry, they take not what they cannot reach. To achieve the reputation for high speeds of marching (30 mi (48 km) a day), Stonewall Jackson used a combination of much audacity, knowledge and shrewd use of the terrain, added to the ability to inspire his troops to great feats of marching and fighting. His men endured forced marches and he used an intimate knowledge of the passes and railroad tunnels along the Blue Ridge Mountains of Virginia to move between the Piedmont region and the Shenandoah Valley with unanticipated rapidity, confounding his opponents in the Union leadership.

Because his opponents learned early in the War that they could not accurately predict his location, Jackson and his "foot cavalry" are considered by many historians to have been a major factor in leadership failures of U.S. President Abraham Lincoln and General George B. McClellan during the Peninsula Campaign. In fear of Jackson, Lincoln ordered extra troops held back from McClellan's expedition to protect Washington, D.C. McClellan, whose actions were later seen as overcautious, was unnerved by Jackson's sudden appearance in front of him at the beginning of the Seven Days Battles. In combination, these actions of Lincoln and McClellan contributed significantly to the failure of the main mission of the Peninsula Campaign, which was to capture the Confederate capital of Richmond in the summer of 1862. Richmond would not be captured until the last days of the war.

== Recognition ==
On January 16, 1866 The Daily Phoenix (Columbia, S.C.) called the Jackson's foot cavalry "immortal."

Indeed, contemporaries marveled at what Jackson's foot cavalry was capable of,

The laws of the human body seemed to have been reversed for these men. They marched, and fought, and triumphed, like war-machines, which felt no need of rest, or food, or sleep. In one day they marched from Harper's Ferry to Strasburgh, nearly fifty miles. ... The very rapidity of their marches separates them from all soldier-comforts—often from their very blankets, however cold the weather; and any other troops but these and their Southern comrades would long since have mutinied and demanded bread and rest. But the shadow of disaffection never flitted over forehead in that command.

Historian Robert K. Krick wrote,

For the men in the ranks who gasped and sweated through the general’s epic marches, his oddities likewise became lovable quirks and his insanity genius. The men discovered that a victory lay at the end of each march, usually without excessive cost in blood. Trading sweat for blood, and exertion for victory, made great good sense to them.

In honor of Jackson and his "foot cavalry" there is a 100 mi (160 km) trail run in Fort Valley, Va with a division called "Stonewall Jackson Foot Cavalry Division".

== See also ==
- Blue Ridge Tunnel
- Rockfish Gap
- Swift Run Gap
- Thornton Gap
