= William Randolph Barbee =

American sculptor (1818–1868)

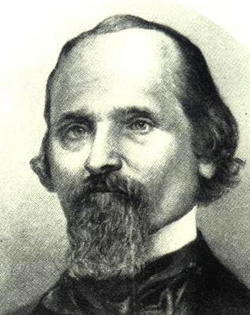
- William Randolph Barbee
- Born: January 17, 1818
- Died: June 16, 1868 (aged 50)
- Education: Richmond College
- Occupations: lawyer and artist
- Notable work: Coquette and Fisher Girl
- Style: classical sculpture

William Randolph Barbee (January 17, 1818 – June 16, 1868) was an American sculptor recognized for creating idealized, sentimental classical figures. Barbee's most notable works were the marble sculptures entitled Coquette and Fisher Girl.

== Biography ==
The family descends from John Barbee, of French-Huguenot ancestry, who settled in Virginia. Barbee was born in "Hawburg", in a part of Culpeper County, Virginia, that later became Rappahannock County. (Alternatively, he was born near Luray in Page County). He was one of the eleven children of Andrew Russell Barbee, Sr. (alternate: Andrew Russel Barbee, Sr.) and Nancy (née Britton) Barbee. Andrew Sr. operated a toll road in the area through Thornton Gap and the Barbee family resided at a lodge at the edge of the road. His siblings included brothers George (b. 1811), Ely (b. 1812), Col. Gabriel Thomas (1814–1908), Lewis Conner (1821–1877), Dr. Andrew Russell, Jr. (1827–1903), and Joseph (b. 1832); and sisters Eliza Annie (b. 1813), Ellam (b. 1815), Mary (b. 1823), Maratha (b. 1828), Laurina Caroline (b. 1829), and Adaline Catherine (b. 1831).

== Career ==
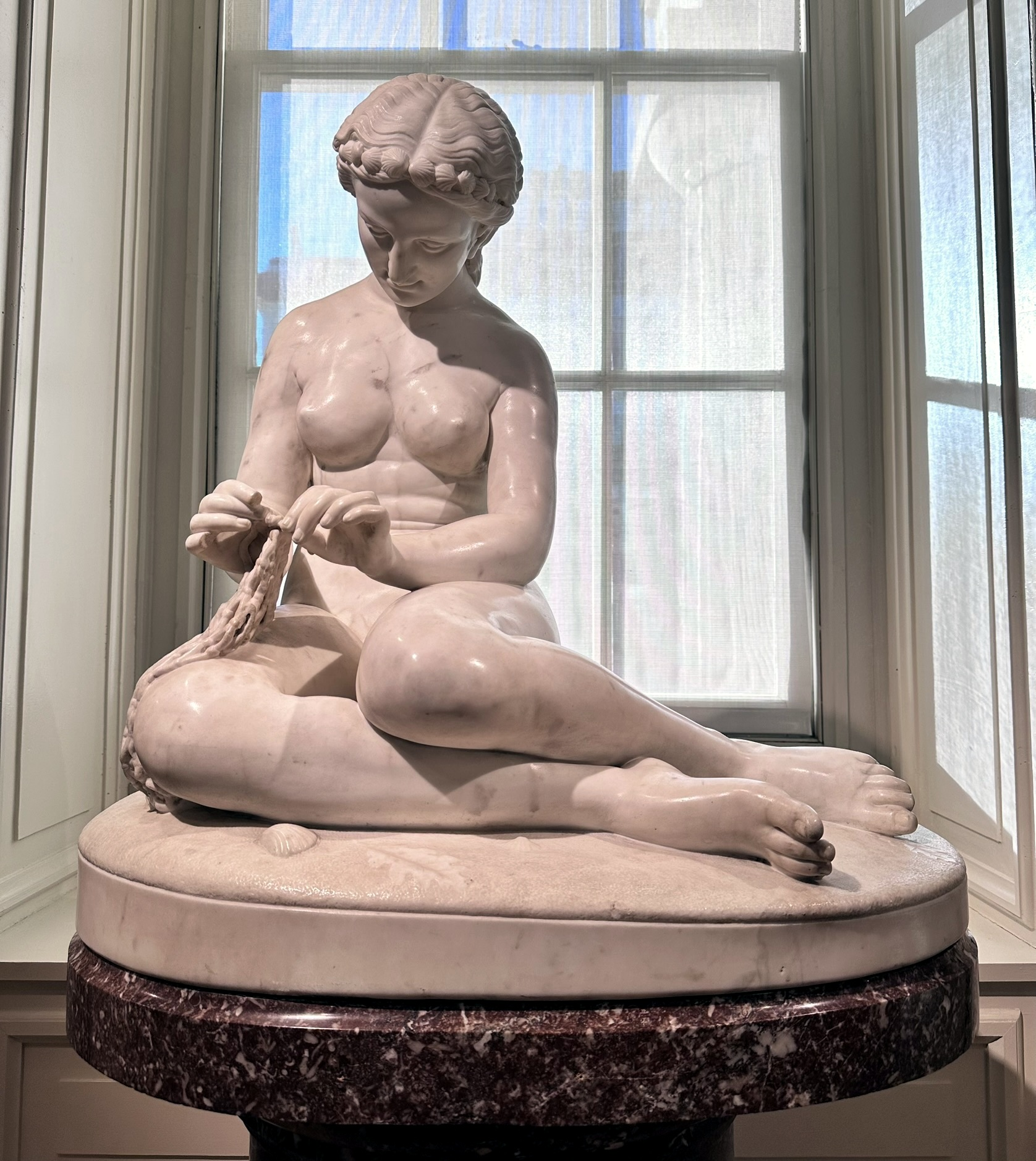
Fisher Girl (around 1858) on display in the Smithsonian American Art Museum

He studied at Richmond College and began working in the offices of Barbee & Cunningham in Moorefield, West Virginia. Upon the death of his father he assumed management of the toll road which his father had controlled.

For a time he practiced law in Luray, Virginia, where he owned the Annie Printz House between 1853 and 1855. In the mid-1850s he moved to Florence, Italy, where he acquired a studio. Barbee's most notable works were marble sculptures entitled Coquette and Fisher Girl. Fisher Girl can today be found in Smithsonian American Art Museum. He also completed a plaster bust of James L. Orr, Speaker of the United States House of Representatives.

Barbee returned to the United States in 1858. He had commenced working on a design for the pediment of the U.S. House of Representatives when the outbreak of the Civil War halted his plans. He also left two major works unfinished at his death, The Star of the West (a depiction of Pocahontas) and The Lost Pleiad. He died near Luray at a place known as "The Bower" and was buried in Green Hill Cemetery there in 1868.

== Personal life ==
Mary's Rock is said to be named for either Barbee's wife, Mary, or the daughter of Frances Thornton. Barbee's son, Herbert, went on to become a sculptor as well; he erected a bust of his father on location at the rock. Barbee was the nephew of General Patrick Henry Brittan, 10th Secretary of State of Alabama.

== Legacy ==
Barbee's birthplace is denoted by a marker (Marker Number C 56.), erected 1972 by the Virginia Historic Landmarks Commission, located at 38°39′38″N 78°19′14″W inside Shenandoah National Park on the border of Page County and Rappahannock County at the cross over of Lee Highway (U.S. 211) and Skyline Drive, several miles east of the town of Luray.
