= Barbi (name) =

Notable people with the name Barbi include:

== Surname ==
- The Barbi Twins, Shane Barbi and Sia Barbi, (born 1963), identical twin models, authors and animal rights activists
- Alice Barbi (1858–1948) Italian singer and violinist
- Ciccio Barbi (1919–1992) Italian actor
- Roberto Barbi (born 1965) Italian long-distance runner
- Santino Barbi (born 2005), Argentine footballer

== Given name ==
- Barbi Benton (born 1950 as Barbara Klein), Playboy model, actress and singer
- Barbi Franklin, U.S. singer-songwriter of the duo Terry and Barbi Franklin
- Barbi Hayden (born 1990 as Callee Wilkerson) U.S. pro-wrestler
- "Barbi" Barbara Henneberger (1940–1964), German alpine skier
