= Barb =

Barb or the BARBs or variation may refer to:

== People ==
- Barb (name), a list of people and fictional characters with the given name or surname
- Barb, a term used by fans of Nicki Minaj to refer to themselves
- The Barbs, a band

== Places ==
- Barb, Ontario, Canada
- DeKalb, Illinois, USA; nicknamed Barb City

== Animals ==
- Barb (feather), the branches issuing from the rachis of feathers
- Barb (fish), common name for a range of freshwater fish
- Barb horse, a breed from North Africa
- Barb (pigeon), a breed of domestic pigeon
- Australian Kelpie or barb, a breed of dog
- The Barb (1863–1888), Australian Thoroughbred racehorse

== Implements ==
- Barding or barb, a type of armor for horses
- A backward-facing point on a fish hook or similar implement, rendering extraction from the victim's flesh more difficult
- A type of pipe fitting called barb, used to connect hosing (the ridges face backward, making insertion easy and removal difficult)
- Barb, a shortened version of barbiturate, a drug that acts as a depressant for the central nervous system

== Other uses ==
- USS Barb, two US Navy submarines
- Wind barbs for each station on a map of reported weather conditions
- Broadcasters' Audience Research Board, which compiles television ratings in the United Kingdom
- Berkeley Barb or The Barb, an underground newspaper of the late 1960s
- Build a Rocket Boy

== See also ==
- Barb wire (disambiguation)
- Barbes (disambiguation)
- Barbe (disambiguation)
- Sainte-Barbe (disambiguation)
- Barbara (disambiguation)
