= Angelika Barbe =

German politician (born 1951)

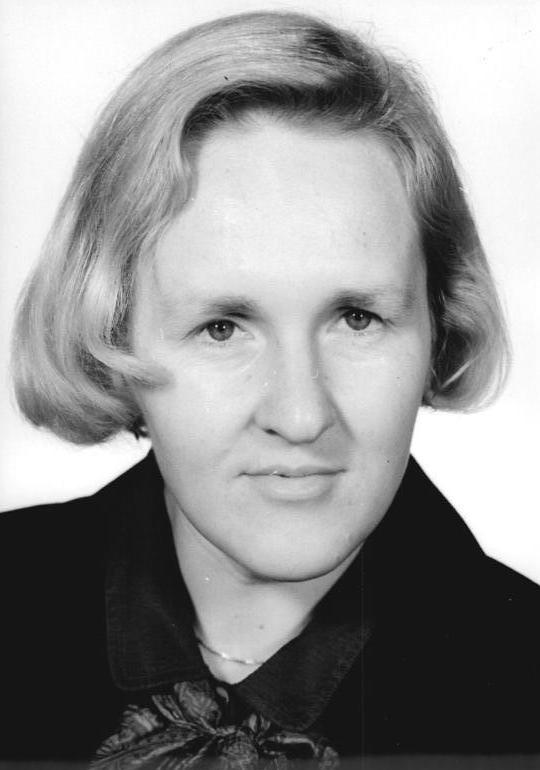
- Barbe in 1990
- Born: Angelika Mangoldt; 26 November 1951 (age 74); Brandenburg an der Havel, East Germany
- Occupations: Peace activist Politician
- Political party: SDP; SPD; CDU

Angelika Barbe (née Mangoldt, 26 November 1951) is a German biologist who became a politician.

During the changes in the later 1980s, which led to a restoration of democracy in East Germany and German reunification just over six months later, she played a leading role in the opposition movement, and was a co-founder of the relaunched (in East Germany) Social Democratic party. Following reunification she served as a member of the national parliament (Bundestag) between 1990 and 1994. She has been identified with a certain "moral rigour" which was on display in 1996 when she switched her political allegiance from the Social Democratic Party (SPD) to the CDU (centre-right party) because she found her SPD party colleagues unnecessarily accommodating with the Party of Democratic Socialism (PDS) (which was at that stage a partially re-invented successor to what had been the ruling party in the old East German one-party dictatorship).

== Life ==
Angelika Mangoldt was born in Brandenburg an der Havel, a small town then in the German Democratic Republic (East Germany), near Berlin. Her father was a freelance landscape gardener who later worked as a builder in a cooperative. She attended school at Schenkenberg and, between 1966 and 1970, at Jeserig nearby. After this she attended a pre-university school ("Erweiterte Oberschule") at Ziesar. In order to progress to higher education it was necessary to pass her school leaving exams ("Abitur"). She encountered major difficulties in obtaining permission to sit the exam because by this time her parents were listed by the authorities as "negative and hostile" ("feindlich negativ") because they made a point of boycotting the country's phony elections (in which, officially, more than 99% of those entitled to vote always participated and more than 99% of those voting backed the single list of candidates put forward by the ruling party). Nevertheless, in the context of East Germany's acute shortage of skilled labour, she took her Abitur, passing a semi-vocational exam designed for skilled manual workers ("Betriebsschlosser"), with a "distinction" citation in 1970. She was able to pass the exam in this way without compromising her political independence.

She studied Biology at Berlin's Humboldt University between 1970 and 1974, with a particular focus on behavioural aspects. Between 1974 and 1979 she worked for a year in "plant preservation" in Potsdam, and then as a biologist with the Hygiene Inspectorate in Berlin's Lichtenberg quarter. Around this time she got married. While bringing up her (three) small children she continued to study behavioural biology in spare moments. She also joined the local (Protestant) church council and over time began to take a closer interest in potentially political issues such as environmental concerns, human rights and pacifism. It was through her church connections that she came across the Pankow Peace Circle, which had been established by Ruth Misselwitz in 1981. Angelika Barbe joined the peace circle in 1986. In 1987 she was a co-founder, with Marianne Eschenhagen, of the Women's Working Group in Berlin's Johannisthal quarter ("Johannisthaler Frauenarbeitskreise"). During 1988/89 she became involved in the Peace Working Group around Ulrike Poppe, Jens Reich and Marianne Birthler. As political tensions rose, especially in the cities, she came under state surveillance in the Ministry for State Security's so-called "Operation Hysteria".

Barbe was one of the small group of people who on 7 October 1989 formed a new incarnation of the Social Democratic Party (SDP) in the Berlin area (initially) of East Germany. She was voted the party's number 2 spokesperson and, in January 1990, its deputy chair. After reunification in October 1990 the East German SDP merged into the West German SPD, which left Angelika Barbe a prominent member of what was, at that point, Germany's second largest political party in terms of vote share.

Meanwhile, in March 1990 East Germany held its first and - as matters turned out - last free and fair general election. The SDP's 21.9% vote share entitled it to 88 of the 400 seats in the national parliament (Volkskammer), and Angelika Barbe, as a candidate, was high enough up on the party list to be elected. She was a member between March and October 1990, serving as chair of the parliamentary committee on women and family.

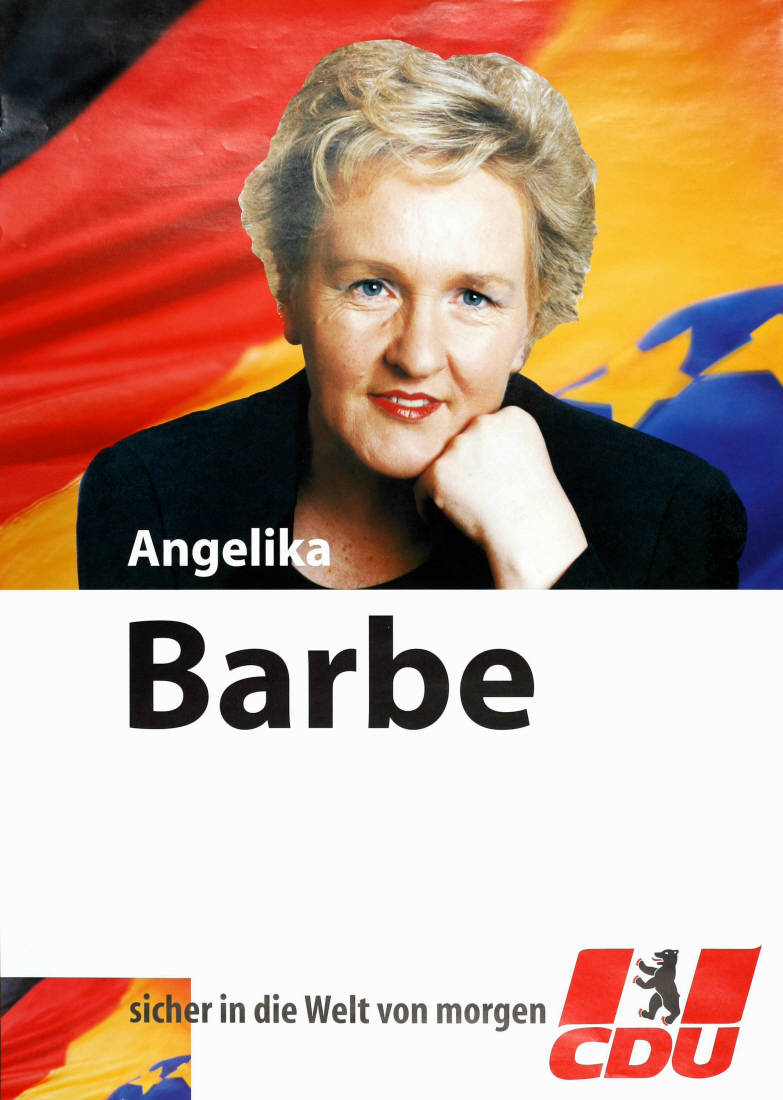
Barbe on an election poster, 1998

After reunification she became a member of the Bundestag between December 1990 and November 1994, elected as part of the SPD party list for the Berlin electoral district. Despite being a member of the SPD party executive during that period, her uncompromising clarity of thought and expression within the party made Barbe the opposite of a natural political networker. She was not favoured by the party officials in Berlin with an easily winnable position on the national party list, instead being pitched against Gregor Gysi of the PDS in the East Berlin electoral district. She was not re-elected in 1994, and a period of unemployment followed.

Between 1995 and 1998 she worked as a senior hospital administrator in Berlin's Prenzlauer Berg quarter. She nevertheless remained politically concerned, in December 1996 switching her political allegiance from the Social Democratic Party (SPD) to the CDU (centre-right party) because she objected to her SPD party (former) comrades entering into political alliances with the Party of Democratic Socialism (PDS). She was joined in switching from national left-wing parties to the CDU by other former citizen rights activists from the East German period, such as Günter Nooke and Vera Lengsfeld. It was also in 1996 that Barbe was a co-founder of the Berlin Citizens' Office for Evaluating the Consequences of the SED Dictatorship ("Berliner Bürgerbüro zur Aufarbeitung von Folgeschäden der SED-Diktatur").

In 2001 she became a member of the National Executive of the umbrella organisation for Communist Tyranny Victims' Associations ("Union der Opferverbände Kommunistischer Gewaltherrschaft" / UOKG), serving as the organisation's deputy chair until 2007. She has also been actively involved between 2000 and 2017 (when she retired) with the Saxony Regional Office for Political Education ("Sächsische Landeszentrale für politische Bildung").
