= Bud Barbee =

American baseball player

- Outfielder
- Born: March 16, 1914; Durham, North Carolina, U.S.
- Died: January 14, 2000 (aged 85); Durham, North Carolina, U.S.
- Batted: Right Threw: Right

Negro league baseball debut
- 1937, for the New York Black Yankees

Last appearance
- 1948, for the New York Black Yankees
- Stats at Baseball Reference

Teams
- New York Black Yankees (1937–1938, 1940); Baltimore Elite Giants (1940); Philadelphia Stars (1942); Baltimore Elite Giants (1943); Cincinnati Clowns (1945); New York Black Yankees (1946–1948)

John Quincy Adams Barbee (March 16, 1914 – January 14, 2000), nicknamed "Bud", was an American Negro league outfielder in the 1930s and 1940s.

A native of Durham, North Carolina, Barbee graduated from Whitted High School. A "prodigious power-hitter", he made his Negro leagues debut in 1937 for the New York Black Yankees. Barbee served in the United States Army during World War II, and returned from service to resume his baseball career. He was the brother of fellow Negro leaguer Lamb Barbee, and the brothers played together for the Cincinnati Clowns in 1945. Barbee died in Durham in 2000 at age 85.
