= Glass-coated wire =

Glass-coating is a process invented in 1924 by G. F. Taylor and converted into production machine by Ulitovski for producing fine glass-coated metal filaments only a few micrometres in diameter.

In this process, known as the "Taylor-wire" or "microwire process" or "Taylor-Ulitovski process", the metal to be produced in microwire form is held in a glass tube, typically a borosilicate composition, which is closed at one end. This end of the tube is then heated in order to soften the glass to a temperature at which the metal part is in liquid state and the glass can be drawn down to produce a fine glass capillary containing a metal core. In recent years the process was converted to continuous one by continuously feeding the metal drop with new material. Although this process is simple enough it requires a lot of factors to be met at the same time. The continuous flow of metal that is being coated by the glass has to be melted at the same temperature as the glass otherwise there may be consistency problems which could lead to a change in the properties of the wire. This means that metals that have a high melting temperature can not be used because it may prove difficult to match the high melting point of the metal to a high melting point in a glass. The rate at which the metal wire is pulled also has to be monitored because a fluctuation in the speed of pulling may cause a difference of width in the wire. Not only does the wire need to be pulled at the same rate but it also needs to be cooled in a stable environment, which is normally conducted by moving the wire through a stream of cooled water or oil. However. there are some apparatuses that can bypass some of these problems by heating the glass and the metal in separate chambers which allows for the use of metals with high melting points. Around the 1950s the Taylor-Ulitovski process was changed to a continuous feeding process of the materials in order to make these wires on a mass production scale.

Metal cores in the range 1 to 120 micrometres with a glass coating a few micrometres in diameter can be readily produced by this method. Glass-coated microwires successfully produced by this method include copper, silver, gold, iron, platinum, and various alloy compositions. It has even proved possible to produce amorphous metal ("glassy metal") cores because the cooling rate achievable by this process can be of the order of 1,000,000 kelvins per second. Glass-coated wire receives all of its material properties from its microstructure. The microstructure in turn receives its properties from the rate at which the wire is cooled. The magnetic properties of glass-coated wires also differ greatly from the properties of amorphous wires and cold-drawn wires due to the difference of the internal stresses that are occurring in the wire. When choosing a metal for the wire Fe-rich compositions of metals typically hold an advantage over Co-rich compositions since Co is more expensive and Fe-rich metals have better magnetic properties. The magnetic properties such as the magnetic softness of Fe-rich materials can be improved by annealing the metal while it is under mechanical stresses. When a magnet is said to be "soft" it implies that the magnetic abilities are only temporary. These magnets are easily magnetized when they are exposed to an electrical current. These types of magnets are often used in computers and technology to control the flow of electric current. This is what makes these wires useful in technological applications because they can easily control the flow of electricity in a device. A hard magnet on the other hand does not need an electrical current to remain magnetized so these magnets are permanent. These magnets are used to create magnetic fields in devices such as an automotive alternator.

The glass coating of wires improves the thermal stability of the wire. The wires will remain stable until the glass, in this case Pyrex (borosilicate), begins to soften. Pyrex generally begins to soften around 673 Kelvin, therefore, these wires can be used in coolers or in heaters that operate under the temperature of 673 Kelvin. Not only does the glass coating of the wire provide thermal stability but it also helps to prevent metallic corrosion of the wire.

Applications for microwire include miniature electrical components based on copper-cored microwire. Amorphous metal cores with special magnetic properties can even be employed in such articles as security tags and related devices. Cobalt and iron base alloys are used to produce anti-shoplifting labels and security papers. The glass-coated wire has also proven quite valuable in devices that are used to sense brain tumors and used in medical equipment. The main consumers of glass-coated wire are the medical and automobile industries since glass coated wire is very valuable when it comes to precise sensors.

The Taylor-Ulitovski process has been proven successful in academic environments however it was never duplicated for high volume mass production. The modified Adar-Bolotinsky process has made it possible to produce micro bonding wire directly from the melt, by casting instead of the traditional drawing, converting this process to a mass production scale. This special manufacturing process also makes it possible to develop RED micro wire, for example RED Copper wire which is unique composite wire with a thin glass-coating and a soft copper core. Glass-coated wire had a huge impact on the LED industry by reducing the cost of interconnect components, specifically using Copper wire instead of Gold. Using the Adar-Bolotinsky process has made it possible to coat these wires with glass which protects it from oxidisation, increasing the shelf and operating life. these improvements have contributed to the current success of LED lighting.
