= BBQ (disambiguation) =

BBQ is an informal spelling of barbecue.

BBQ or bbq may also refer to:

== Places ==
- Burton-Nibbs International Airport (IATA airport code: BBQ), currently serving Codrington on Barbuda
- Barbuda Codrington Airport (IATA airport code: BBQ), formerly serving Codrington on Barbuda
- Basin Bridge railway station (rail station code: BBQ), serving Chennai, India

== People ==
- BBQ, a one-man band project of Canadian musician Mark Sultan (born 1973)
- Dr. BBQ, a barbecue pitmaster, author, and television personality, see Ray Lampe
- Babekyou, nickname of Haitian militant Jimmy Chérizier

== Art, entertainment, and media ==
=== Music ===
- BBQ, the studio recordings code for Beggars Banquet Records
- "The BBQ", a song from the 2017 album Champion by Tina & Her Pony

=== Other arts, entertainment, and media ===
- The BBQ, a 2018 Australian comedy film written and directed by Stephen Amis
- "BBQ" (Bluey), an episode of the first season of the animated TV series Bluey

== Other uses ==
- Bamali language, an ISO 639-3 code

== See also ==
- Barbecue (disambiguation)
- List of barbecue restaurants, many of which have "BBQ" in the name
