= Barbee (singer) =

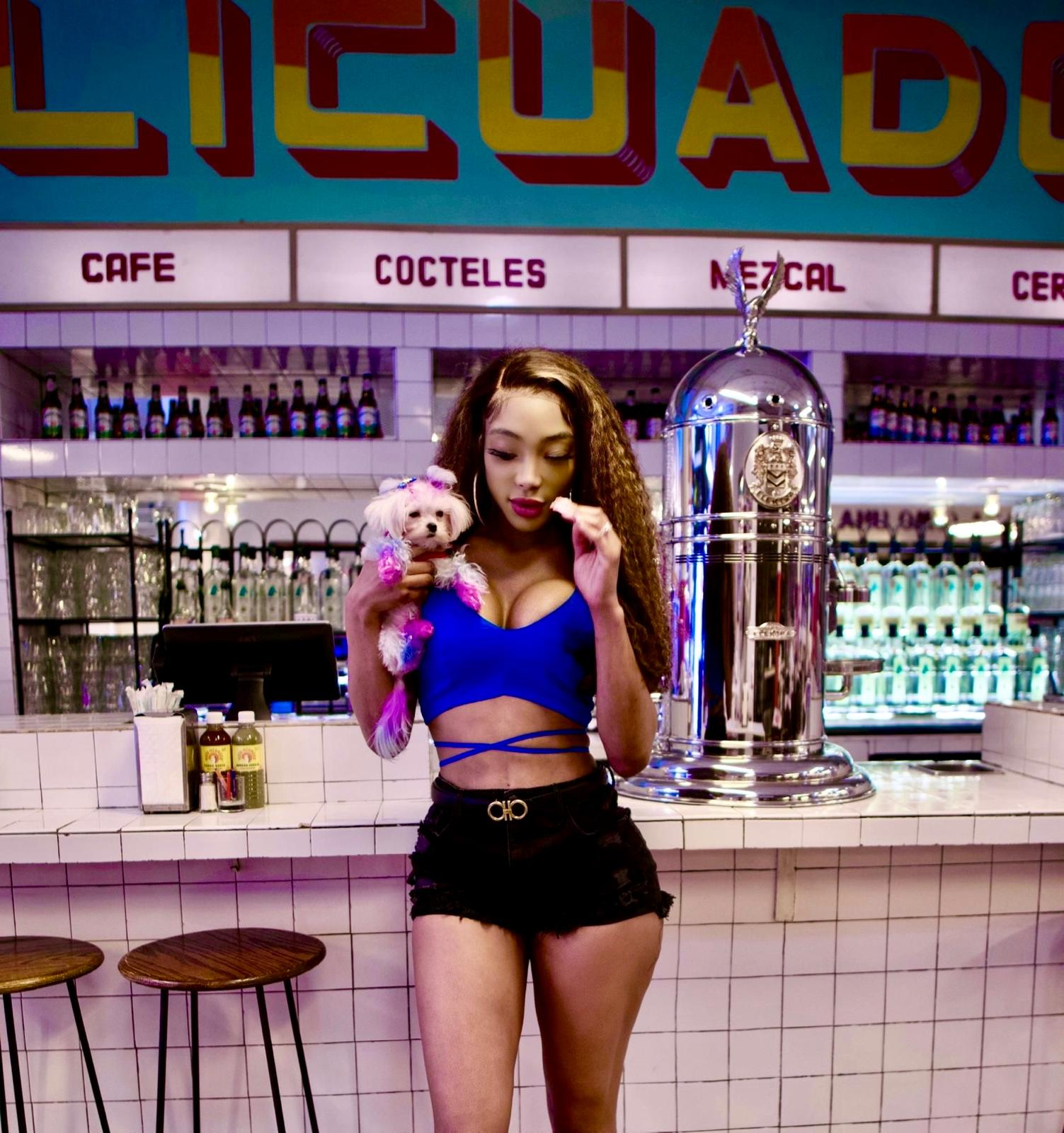

Background information
- Born: Faith Barbee J Eselebor; February 20, 1992 (age 34); New York City, United States
- Genres: Dancehall, reggae, reggae fusion, Afrobeats, Pop
- Occupations: singer; entertainer; songwriter
- Instrument: Vocals
- Years active: 2016–present
- Website: www.originalbarbee.com

Faith J. Eselebor, known professionally as Barbee, is a Nigerian-Jamaican singer, songwriter, actress, and entrepreneur of Jamaican and African descent. She is known for her fusion of reggae, pop, dancehall, and R&B, and has gained international recognition through her collaborations with artists such as Junior Kelly, Beenie Man, and Trina. Barbee has also ventured into acting and business, founding a beauty and lifestyle brand, as well as a content and recording studio in Atlanta.

== Early life ==
Faith J. Eselebor was born to Jamaican and African parents. She adopted the stage name Barbee from an early age, inspired by her mother's admiration for the iconic Mattel doll brand, Barbie. The nickname eventually evolved into a defining part of her artistic identity and personal brand. She spent her early years developing her musical abilities and would later go on to bridge cultural influences from the Caribbean, Africa, and the United States in her music.

== Career ==
Barbee rose to prominence with the release of Missing You, a reggae duet with acclaimed roots reggae artist Junior Kelly. The single received widespread radio play across the Caribbean, United States, Canada, and West Africa, and established her as a rising star in the reggae and reggae-fusion scenes.

She followed this success by teaming up with Beenie Man, one of Jamaica’s most prolific dancehall artists. Together, they released several hit singles including Paddy Cake, Diva in My Sneakers, and Light Some Candles. Barbee also toured internationally with Beenie Man, performing to enthusiastic audiences around the world and showcasing her dynamic stage presence. She also featured in Beenie Man's single and music video, "Give It Up". In 2009 Barbee performed at the 20th Annual Susquehanna Community Festival in Philadelphia. She also performed at the Annual Jamaica Day in Toronto, Canada. Barbee was also honored as "Most Promising Female Artiste" by the Apollo Theatre for her stage presence and style. In the same year, her talent caught the attention of veteran producer and saxophonist Dean Fraser, who collaborated with her on several tracks. Notably, she recorded a reggae version of Karyn White’s classic Can I Stay With You, as well as the upbeat anthem Feel So Good. The latter won Best Reggae Music Video at the Jamaica EME (Excellence in Music and Entertainment) Awards, and was featured in the Hollywood film House Arrest, in which Barbee made an appearance as a correctional officer. She continued to release music that demonstrated her versatility and global appeal, including the singles Just Like That and ‘’Whoa’’, the latter produced with Grammy-winning duo Rock City.

In 2022, Barbee released In Chemistry, a sultry reggae-pop track that received strong airplay in the Caribbean and UK. That same year, she collaborated with American rapper Trina on the single Come See Bout Me, accompanied by a music video filmed in Los Angeles.

In 2025, Barbee traveled to Ghana for a media tour and creative retreat. During this time, she made appearances on various television and radio platforms in Accra, Cape Coast, and Aburi, while connecting with key players in the Ghanaian music and entertainment scene. She also filmed music videos and captured new content in the region. Barbee documented much of this journey through her official Instagram account, providing fans a glimpse into her creative process and cultural exploration.

== Philanthropy and Cultural Engagement ==
While in Ghana, Barbee visited Cape Coast as part of a personal exploration of her African heritage. Deeply moved by the historical significance of the site, she expressed a commitment to using her platform to highlight stories of African resilience and legacy through her music.

She also partnered with the Roses Foundation to co-host a Children’s Day celebration in the Oti Region alongside her mother. The event featured arts, music, and creative workshops aimed at inspiring and empowering local children. Barbee has expressed a strong commitment to youth development and community upliftment, particularly through music and the arts.

== Entrepreneurship ==
Barbee is based in Buckhead, Atlanta, Georgia, where she owns a state-of-the-art recording studio and is developing a content house. This space is intended to support collaboration between musicians, influencers, and digital creatives by providing professional studio facilities, video production equipment, and content creation infrastructure.

She is also the founder of Bratties, a lifestyle and beauty brand that promotes self-love, luxury, and empowerment for women. The product line includes skincare serums, lipsticks, waist trainers, and other beauty and wellness essentials. Barbee has described the brand as a movement encouraging women to embrace their inner royalty and indulge in self-care.

== Discography ==
=== Singles ===
- "Missing You" featuring Junior Kelly. (2006)
- "Diva in My Sneakers" (2007)
- "Love You Anyway" (2008)
- "Light Some Candles" (2009)
- "Feels So Good" (2009)
- "Come See Bout Me" featuring Trina (2010)
- "Paddy Cake" with Beenie Man (2011)
- "Forever Love" (2012)
- "Just Like That" (2014)
- "Whoa" featuring Rock City (2015)
- "Babylon" (2015)
- "Out The Door" (2017)
- "Back It Up" (2022)
- "Touch Me" (2022)
- "Chemistry" (2022)
- "Mercy" (2023)
- "Love You From A Distance" (2023)

== Filmography ==
- House Arrest (2009) – Cameo appearance as Correctional Officer

== Awards ==
International Reggae Awards Jamaica

- 2008, Best Collaborative Single Beanie Man Ft. Barbee ‘Give it Up’ (Won)

Reggae Music Awards Apollo Theater New York

- 2008 Most Promising Female Artist (Won)

International European Reggae Awards

- 2014 Best New Artist (Won)
