= Peter Barbey =

American publisher

- Born: Peter D. Barbey; 1957 or 1958 (age 67–68)
- Occupations: Businessman and publisher
- Title: CEO and president, Reading Eagle Company and Village Voice
- Spouse: Pamela Terry Barbey
- Children: Matt Barbey
- Parent(s): Edwin Quier Barbey; Ruth Virginia Diener

Peter D. Barbey (born 1957/58) is an American publisher, chief executive officer (CEO) and president at Reading Eagle Company, which owns the Reading Eagle newspaper and the WEEU 830 AM radio station, both based in Reading, Pennsylvania.

Barbey's family is listed by Forbes as one of "America's wealthiest families" and is ranked as the 48th wealthiest family in America.

== Early life ==
Barbey is the son of the heir and businessman Edwin Quier "Bud" Barbey and his wife Ruth Virginia Diener.

Barbey is one of the heirs to the VF Corporation retail fortune that includes Vans, The North Face, The Timberland Company, and Lee jeans. Fewer than a dozen Barbey family members own almost 20% of VF Corporation, which has $12 billion in annual revenues. VF Corporation was founded by Peter Barbey's great-grandfather John Barbey, and taken public in 1951 by his grandfather John Edward Barbey.

== Village Voice ==
In October 2015, through his newly created Black Walnut Holdings, he acquired The Village Voice. In August 2018, a year after going to an online-only format, the Voice announced it was ceasing to publish new material. In his announcement, Barbey promised a "fully digitized Voice archive [for] coming generations", with some employees staying on to complete that task. Three-time Voice art critic Peter Schjeldahl remembered his stints at the publication in a piece in The New Yorker at the time.

== Personal life ==
He is married to Pamela Terry Barbey. Until 2011 they lived in Phoenix, Arizona, before moving to Reading, Pennsylvania.

In 2016, Barbey bought an apartment in New York City's Greenwich Village for $27 million.

Barbey has one son, Matt Barbey, who lives in New York City.

== Philanthropy ==
Barbey, his wife and son operate their charitable foundation, the Edwin Barbey Charitable Trust, from which they make charitable donations for causes notably in Pennsylvania, Arizona and New York City as well as other national causes.
