= Barbed Wire =

Barbed Wire may refer to

== Barbed wire ==
- Barbed wire
- Razor wire

== Film ==
- Barbed Wire (1927 film), a war film starring Pola Negri
- Barbed Wire (1952 film), a Western film starring Gene Autry

== Other ==
- BarbedWire Studios, developers of the video game Gates of Hell
- Barbed Wire, a 2000 album by rock and roll guitarist Link Wray
- Barbed Wire, an American Anarcho-punk band from Denver, Colorado
- Barbed Wire, a novel by Máirtín Ó Cadhain, published posthumously in 2002
- "Barbed Wire", a song by Kendrick Lamar from the 2010 album Overly Dedicated

== See also ==
- Barb Wire
