= Thornton Gap =

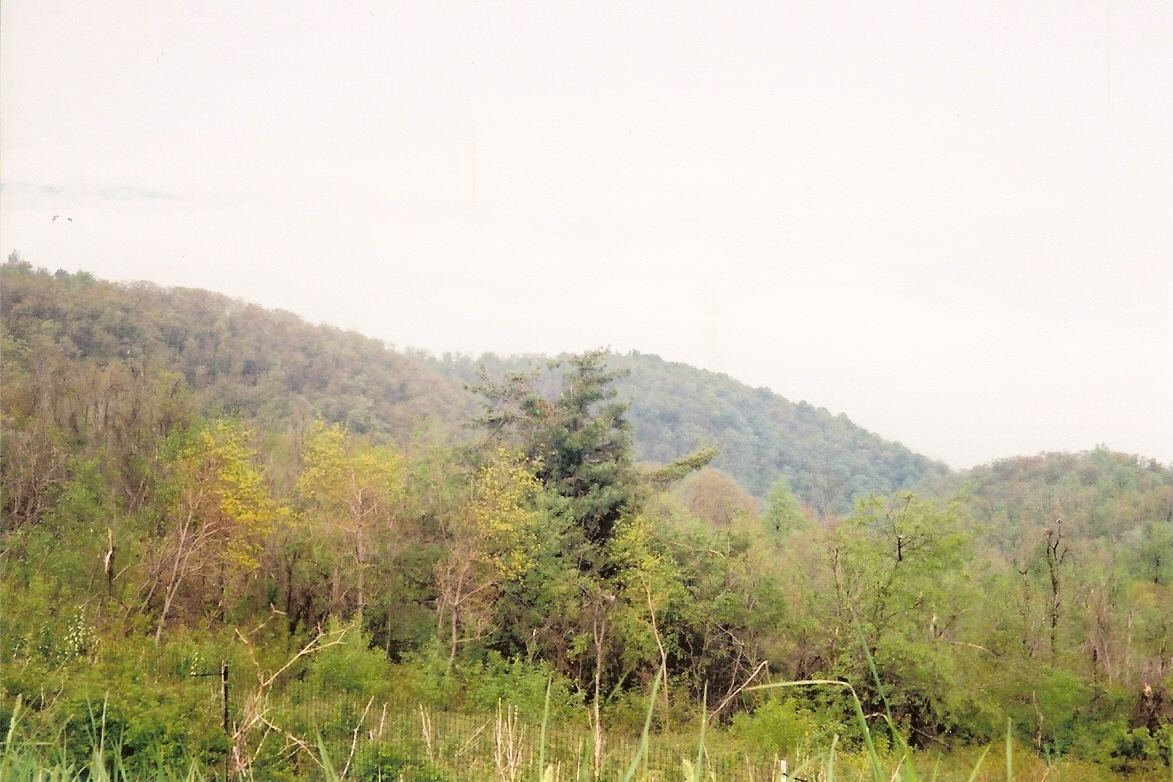
- View from Skyline Drive near Thornton Gap
- Interactive map of Thornton Gap
- Elevation: 2,460 ft (750 m)
- Traversed by: US 211

Location
- Location: Page / Rappahannock counties, Virginia, United States
- Range: Blue Ridge Mountains
- Coordinates: 38°39′40″N 78°19′12″W

Thornton Gap is a wind gap located in the Blue Ridge Mountains in Virginia separating the Shenandoah Valley from the Piedmont region of the state.

== History ==
Thornton Gap was named for Francis Thornton (1711 – April 14, 1749), owner of the land to the east and the "F.T. Valley". In 1740, he built a mansion in the Piedmont region near Nethers in Rappahannock County.

Historian J. Houston Harrison indicates in 1737 the Harrison family migrated through the Gap from Alexandria before their settlement in the valley and founding of Harrisonburg.

The privately owned Thornton's Gap Turnpike Company was formed to build a road over the mountains at Thornton's Gap. The toll road opened in 1806.

Thornton Gap was one of the passages through the Blue Ridge Mountains between the Shenandoah Valley and the Piedmont region of Virginia used by Confederate General Stonewall Jackson to move his famous "foot cavalry" troops during the American Civil War.

Prior to the building of the Shenandoah National Park and the Skyline Drive by the federal Works Progress Administration (WPA) during the Great Depression, the town of Beahm was located at Thornton Gap.

Sculptor William Randolph Barbee was the son of a toll collector at Thornton Gap; his son Herbert later erected a bust in his memory at the site.

== Current information ==
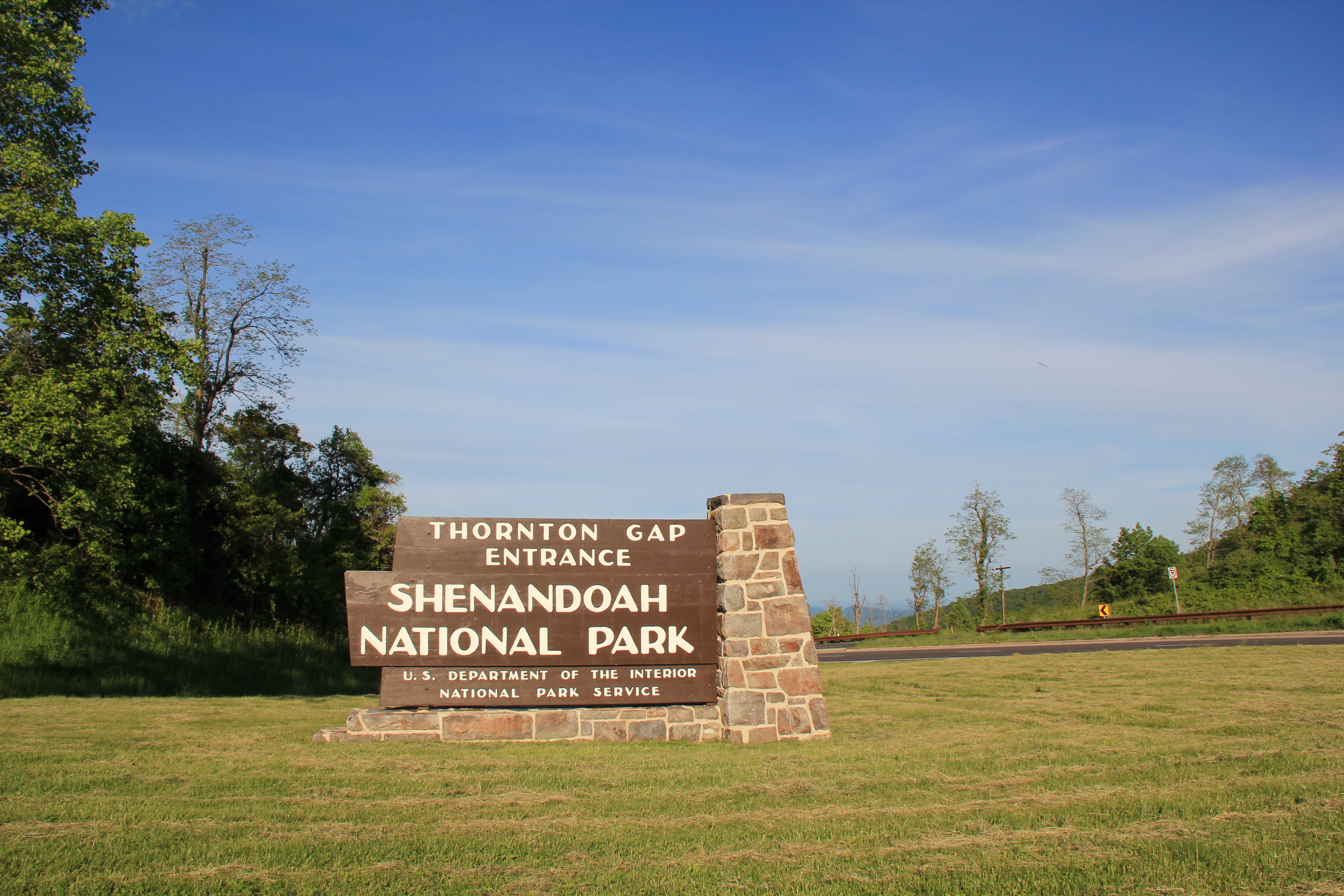
Skyline Drive entrance sign at Thornton Gap

Thornton Gap is the site of the mountain crossing of U.S. Highway 211. It is located at the border of Page County and Rappahannock County. At Thornton Gap, there is an entry point for the Skyline Drive, which runs between Front Royal and the northern terminus with the Blue Ridge Parkway at Rockfish Gap. The Skyline Drive generally following the mountain ridge tops through the Shenandoah National Park, which has its headquarters near Thornton Gap in the Town of Luray. The Appalachian Trail also passes through Thornton Gap.

== See also ==
- Former counties, cities, and towns of Virginia
