= Iran at the Deaflympics =

- IPC code: IRI
- NPC: I. R. Iran Deaf Sports Federation
- Website: www.dsf.ir
- Medals: Gold 112 Silver 91 Bronze 109 Total 312

Summer appearances
- 1924; 1928; 1931; 1935; 1939; 1949; 1953; 1957; 1961; 1965; 1969; 1973; 1977; 1981; 1985; 1989; 1993; 1997; 2001; 2005; 2009; 2013; 2017; 2021

Iran has been participating at the Deaflympics since 1957 and has earned a total of 312 medals.

== Medal tables ==
Champions Runners up Third place Fourth place

=== Medals by Summer Games ===
Games	Athletes	Gold	Silver	Bronze	Total	Rank
(France) 1924 Paris	Did Not Compete					
(Netherlands) 1928 Amsterdam	Did Not Compete					
(Germany) 1931 Nuremberg	Did Not Compete					
(United Kingdom) 1935 London	Did Not Compete					
(Sweden) 1939 Stockholm	Did Not Compete					
(Denmark) 1949 Copenhagen	Did Not Compete					
(Belgium) 1953 Brussels	Did Not Compete					
(Italy) 1957 Milan	2	0	0	0	0	-
(Finland) 1961 Helsinki	5	3	1	2	6	?
(United States) 1965 Washington	8	4	6	0	10	9
(Socialist Federal Republic of Yugoslavia) 1969 Belgrade	13	5	3	3	11	6
(Sweden) 1973 Malmö	32	2	4	1	7	11
(Romania) 1977 Bucharest	40	8	4	2	14	3
(West Germany) 1981 Cologne	11	7	5	2	14	3
(United States) 1985 Los Angeles	Did Not Compete					
(New Zealand) 1989 Christchurch	26	10	4	5	19	5
(Bulgaria) 1993 Sofia	48	11	4	3	18	3
(Denmark) 1997 Copenhagen	28	8	7	3	18	6
(Italy) 2001 Rome	66	8	7	4	19	6
(Australia) 2005 Melbourne	56	8	6	5	19	6
(Chinese Taipei) 2009 Taipei	52	3	5	5	13	17
(Bulgaria) 2013 Sofia	80	7	4	21	32	8
(Turkey) 2017 Samsun	92	5	9	20	34	7
(Brazil) 2021 Caxias Do Sul	68	14	12	14	40	4
(Japan) 2025 Tokyo	82	8	10	19	37	7
Total		111	91	109	311	6

=== Medals by Winter Games ===
Games	Athletes	Gold	Silver	Bronze	Total	Rank
(Austria) 1949 Seefeld	Did Not Compete					
(Norway) 1953 Oslo	Did Not Compete					
(West Germany) 1955 Oberammergau	Did Not Compete					
(Switzerland) 1959 Montana-Vermala	Did Not Compete					
(Sweden) 1963 Åre	Did Not Compete					
(West Germany) 1967 Berchtesgaden	Did Not Compete					
(Switzerland) 1971 Adelboden	Did Not Compete					
(United States) 1975 Lake Placid	Did Not Compete					
(France) 1979 Méribel	Did Not Compete					
(Italy) 1983 Madonna di Campiglio	Did Not Compete					
(Norway) 1987 Oslo	Did Not Compete					
(Canada) 1991 Banff	Did Not Compete					
(Finland) 1995 Ylläs	Did Not Compete					
(Switzerland) 1999 Davos	Did Not Compete					
(Sweden) 2003 Sundsvall	Did Not Compete					
(United States) 2007 Salt Lake City	Did Not Compete					
(Slovakia) 2011 Vysoké Tatry	Did Not Compete					
(Russia) 2015 Khanty-Mansiysk	Did Not Compete					
(Italy) 2019 Sondrio Province	Did Not Compete					
(Turkey) 2024 Erzurum	12	1	0	0	1	8
Total		1	0	0	1	24

=== Medals by summer sport ===
Sport	Gold	Silver	Bronze	Total
Athletics	0	0	0	0
Football	0	0	0	0
Judo	0	0	0	0
Karate	0	0	0	0
Shooting	0	0	0	0
Taekwondo	0	0	0	0
Volleyball	0	0	0	0
Wrestling	0	0	0	0
Totals (8 entries)	0	0	0	0

=== Medals by winter sport ===
Sport	Gold	Silver	Bronze	Total
Futsal	1	0	0	1
Totals (1 entries)	1	0	0	1

== See also ==
- Iran at the Paralympics
- Iran at the Olympics
