= Kazakhstan at the Deaflympics =

- IPC code: KAZ
- NPC: Deaflympic Kazakhstan
- Medals: Gold 3 Silver 1 Bronze 5 Total 9

Summer appearances
- 1997; 2001; 2005; 2009; 2013; 2017; 2021

Winter appearances
- 2015; 2019; 2023

Other related appearances
- Soviet Union (1957–1991)

Kazakhstan first competed at the Deaflympics for the first time in 1997. Kazakhstan claimed their first Deaflympic medal in their first Deaflympic experience and finished with 2 medals in the event. So far, Kazakhstan has managed to bag 8 medals in the event's history.

Kazakhstan also participated in the 2015 Winter Deaflympics, which is also the only Winter Deaflympics event where Kazakhstan was eligible to participate.

== Medal tallies ==
=== Summer Deaflympics ===
Year	Gold	Silver	Bronze	Total
1997	1	0	1	2
2005	0	0	1	1
2009	0	0	1	1
2013	1	0	0	1
2017	1	1	2	4

=== Winter Deaflympics ===
Year	Gold	Silver	Bronze	Total
2015	0	0	0	0

== Medals ==
=== Medals by Summer Games ===
Games	Athletes	Gold	Silver	Bronze	Total	Rank
(France) 1924 Paris	Did Not Participate					
(Netherlands) 1928 Amsterdam	Did Not Participate					
(Germany) 1931 Nuremberg	Did Not Participate					
(United Kingdom) 1935 London	Did Not Participate					
(Sweden) 1939 Stockholm	Did Not Participate					
(Denmark) 1949 Copenhagen	Did Not Participate					
(Belgium) 1953 Brussels	Did Not Participate					
(Italy) 1957 Milan	Did Not Participate					
(Finland) 1961 Helsinki	Did Not Participate					
(United States) 1965 Washington	Did Not Participate					
(Socialist Federal Republic of Yugoslavia) 1969 Belgrade	Did Not Participate					
(Sweden) 1973 Malmö	Did Not Participate					
(Romania) 1977 Bucharest	Did Not Participate					
(West Germany) 1981 Cologne	Did Not Participate					
(United States) 1985 Los Angeles	Did Not Participate					
(New Zealand) 1989 Christchurch	8	0	0	1	1	23
(Bulgaria) 1993 Sofia	Did Not Participate					
(Denmark) 1997 Copenhagen	13	1	0	1	2	29
(Italy) 2001 Rome	15	2	3	3	8	16
(Australia) 2005 Melbourne	69	5	8	4	17	9
(Chinese Taipei) 2009 Taipei	78	12	9	17	38	4
(Bulgaria) 2013 Sofia	67	12	5	7	24	5
(Turkey) 2017 Samsun	107	14	9	11	34	5
(Brazil) 2021 Caxias do Sul	Did Not Participate					
(Japan) 2025 Tokyo	To be determined					
Total		46	34	44	124	17

=== Medals by Winter Games ===
Games	Athletes	Gold	Silver	Bronze	Total	Rank
(Austria) 1949 Seefeld	Did Not Participate					
(Norway) 1953 Oslo	Did Not Participate					
(West Germany) 1955 Oberammergau	Did Not Participate					
(Switzerland) 1959 Montana-Vermala	Did Not Participate					
(Sweden) 1963 Åre	Did Not Participate					
(West Germany) 1967 Berchtesgaden	Did Not Participate					
(Switzerland) 1971 Adelboden	Did Not Participate					
(United States) 1975 Lake Placid	Did Not Participate					
(France) 1979 Méribel	Did Not Participate					
(Italy) 1983 Madonna di Campiglio	Did Not Participate					
(Norway) 1987 Oslo	Did Not Participate					
(Canada) 1991 Banff	Did Not Participate					
(Finland) 1995 Ylläs	Did Not Participate					
(Switzerland) 1999 Davos	Did Not Participate					
(Sweden) 2003 Sundsvall	Did Not Participate					
(United States) 2007 Salt Lake City	14	0	0	0	0	12
(Slovakia) 2011 Vysoké Tatry	Games Cancelled					
(Russia) 2015 Khanty-Mansiysk	22	0	0	0	0	-
(Italy) 2019 Valtellina-Valchiavenna	37	1	0	0	1	6
(Turkey) 2023 Erzurum	27	0	0	1	1	6
Total		1	0	1	2	23

== See also ==
- Kazakhstan at the Olympics
- Kazakhstan at the Paralympics
