= China at the Deaflympics =

- IPC code: CHN
- NPC: Chinese Deaflympic Committee
- Website: www.cdpf.org.cn
- Medals: Gold 56 Silver 42 Bronze 55 Total 153

Summer appearances
- 1989; 1993; 1997; 2001; 2005; 2009; 2013; 2017; 2021

Winter appearances
- 2007; 2015; 2019; 2023

China completed at the Deaflympics for the first time way back in 1989. Since then, China has been regularly participating at the Deaflympics. China won its first Deaflympics medal also in 1989. China has competed at the Winter Deaflympics in 2007 and in 2015.

== Medals ==
=== Medals by Summer Games ===
| Games | Athletes | Gold | Silver | Bronze | Total | Rank |
|---|---|---|---|---|---|---|
| (France) 1924 Paris | Did Not Participate | | | | | |
| (Netherlands) 1928 Amsterdam | Did Not Participate | | | | | |
| (Germany) 1931 Nuremberg | Did Not Participate | | | | | |
| (United Kingdom) 1935 London | Did Not Participate | | | | | |
| (Sweden) 1939 Stockholm | Did Not Participate | | | | | |
| (Denmark) 1949 Copenhagen | Did Not Participate | | | | | |
| (Belgium) 1953 Brussels | Did Not Participate | | | | | |
| (Italy) 1957 Milan | Did Not Participate | | | | | |
| (Finland) 1961 Helsinki | Did Not Participate | | | | | |
| (United States) 1965 Washington | Did Not Participate | | | | | |
| (Socialist Federal Republic of Yugoslavia) 1969 Belgrade | Did Not Participate | | | | | |
| (Sweden) 1973 Malmö | Did Not Participate | | | | | |
| (Romania) 1977 Bucharest | Did Not Participate | | | | | |
| (West Germany) 1981 Cologne | Did Not Participate | | | | | |
| (United States) 1985 Los Angeles | Did Not Participate | | | | | |
| (New Zealand) 1989 Christchurch | 8 | 0 | 0 | 1 | 1 | 23 |
| (Bulgaria) 1993 Sofia | Did Not Participate | | | | | |
| (Denmark) 1997 Copenhagen | 13 | 1 | 0 | 1 | 2 | 29 |
| (Italy) 2001 Rome | 15 | 2 | 3 | 3 | 8 | 16 |
| (Australia) 2005 Melbourne | 69 | 5 | 8 | 4 | 17 | 9 |
| (Chinese Taipei) 2009 Taipei | 78 | 12 | 9 | 17 | 38 | 4 |
| (Bulgaria) 2013 Sofia | 67 | 12 | 5 | 7 | 24 | 5 |
| (Turkey) 2017 Samsun | 107 | 14 | 9 | 11 | 34 | 5 |
| (Brazil) 2021 Caxias do Sul | Did Not Participate | | | | | |
| (Japan) 2025 Tokyo | | | | | | |
| Total | | 46 | 34 | 44 | 124 | 17 |

=== Medals by Winter Games ===
| Games | Athletes | Gold | Silver | Bronze | Total | Rank |
|---|---|---|---|---|---|---|
| (Austria) 1949 Seefeld | Did Not Participate | | | | | |
| (Norway) 1953 Oslo | Did Not Participate | | | | | |
| (West Germany) 1955 Oberammergau | Did Not Participate | | | | | |
| (Switzerland) 1959 Montana-Vermala | Did Not Participate | | | | | |
| (Sweden) 1963 Åre | Did Not Participate | | | | | |
| (West Germany) 1967 Berchtesgaden | Did Not Participate | | | | | |
| (Switzerland) 1971 Adelboden | Did Not Participate | | | | | |
| (United States) 1975 Lake Placid | Did Not Participate | | | | | |
| (France) 1979 Méribel | Did Not Participate | | | | | |
| (Italy) 1983 Madonna di Campiglio | Did Not Participate | | | | | |
| (Norway) 1987 Oslo | Did Not Participate | | | | | |
| (Canada) 1991 Banff | Did Not Participate | | | | | |
| (Finland) 1995 Ylläs | Did Not Participate | | | | | |
| (Switzerland) 1999 Davos | Did Not Participate | | | | | |
| (Sweden) 2003 Sundsvall | Did Not Participate | | | | | |
| (United States) 2007 Salt Lake City | 14 | 0 | 0 | 1 | 1 | 12 |
| (Slovakia) 2011 Vysoké Tatry | Games Cancelled | | | | | |
| (Russia) 2015 Khanty-Mansiysk | 22 | 1 | 1 | 2 | 4 | 8 |
| (Italy) 2019 Valtellina-Valchiavenna | 37 | 2 | 0 | 2 | 4 | 6 |
| (Turkey) 2024 Erzurum | 27 | 7 | 7 | 6 | 20 | 2 |
| Total | | 3 | 1 | 5 | 9 | 16 |

== See also ==
- China at the Paralympics
- China at the Olympics
