= France at the Deaflympics =

- IPC code: FRA
- Medals: Gold 76 Silver 101 Bronze 99 Total 276

Summer appearances
- 1924; 1928; 1931; 1935; 1939; 1949; 1953; 1957; 1961; 1965; 1969; 1973; 1977; 1981; 1985; 1989; 1993; 1997; 2001; 2005; 2009; 2013; 2017; 2021

Winter appearances
- 1975; 1979; 1983; 1987; 1991; 1995; 1999; 2003–2007; 2015; 2019; 2023

France has been participating at the Deaflympics since 1924 and has earned a total of 268 medals.

== Medal tallies ==
=== Summer Deaflympics ===
Event	Gold	Silver	Bronze	Total
1924	22	17	9	48
1931	5	7	11	23
1935	8	3	6	17
1939	3	9	7	19
1949	4	6	4	14
1953	0	5	6	11
1957	0	2	1	3
1961	0	0	2	2
1965	0	1	1	2
1969	0	0	1	1
1973	3	3	1	7
1977	0	4	1	5
1981	1	5	5	11
1985	6	9	9	24
1989	1	1	1	3
1993	1	1	3	5
1997	0	2	3	5
2001	4	3	1	8
2005	1	1	1	3
2009	4	2	6	12
2013	2	6	3	11
2017	0	0	4	4
2021	8	3	5	16

=== Winter Deaflympics ===
Event	Gold	Silver	Bronze	Total
1975	1	3	1	5
1979	2	4	1	7
1983	3	3	1	7
1987	0	0	1	1
1991	1	1	0	2
1995	1	0	0	1
1999	1	0	1	2
2015	1	1	3	5
2019	0	3	2	5
2019	0	3	2	5
2019	0	3	2	5
2024	1	2	5	8

== See also ==
- France at the Paralympics
- France at the Olympics
