= United States at the Deaflympics =

- IPC code: USA
- NPC: USA Deaf Sports Federation
- Website: www.usdeafsports.org
- Medals Ranked 1st: Gold 375 Silver 321 Bronze 363 Total 1,059

Summer appearances
- 1935; 1939; 1949; 1953; 1957; 1961; 1965; 1969; 1973; 1977; 1981; 1985; 1989; 1993; 1997; 2001; 2005; 2009; 2013; 2017; 2021

Winter appearances
- 1967; 1971; 1975; 1979; 1983; 1987; 1991; 1995; 1999; 2003; 2007; 2015; 2019; 2023

The United States has been participating at the Deaflympics from 1935 and it is also currently placed first in the all time Deaflympics medal list. US has won more than 1000 medals, the only nation to do so in Deaflympics.

USA has been participating at the Winter Deaflympics from 1967.

== Medal tallies ==
=== Summer Deaflympics ===
Host nation

Edition				
(United Kingdom) London 1935	1	2	1	4
(Sweden) Stockholm 1939	0	1	0	1
(Denmark) Copenhagen 1949	0	1	0	1
(Belgium) Brussels 1953	2	0	1	3
(Italy) Milan 1957	7	6	10	23
(Finland) Helsinki 1961	14	14	12	40
(United States) Washington D.C.1965	9	21	23	53
(Socialist Federal Republic of Yugoslavia) Belgrade 1969	22	23	21	66
(Sweden) Malmö 1973	29	22	31	82
(Romania) Bucaresti 1977	38	35	30	103
(West Germany) Cologne 1981	45	30	35	110
(United States) Los Angeles 1985	46	30	33	109
(New Zealand) Christchurch 1989	22	30	23	75
(Bulgaria) Sofia 1993	36	25	23	84
(Denmark) Copenhagen 1997	28	21	27	76
(Italy) Rome 2001	26	21	23	70
(Australia) Melbourne 2005	9	12	12	33
Taipei 2009	10	5	7	22
(Bulgaria) Sofia 2013	8	8	13	29
(Turkey) Samsun 2017	5	3	8	16
(Brazil) Caxias do Sul 2022	20	11	24	55
(Japan) Tokyo 2025	17	7	12	35
Total	375	321	363	1056

=== Winter Deaflympics ===
Event	Gold	Silver	Bronze	Total
1967	2	0	0	2

== Notable achievements ==
- In the 1977 Summer Deaflympics held in Romania, Jeff Float of US won 10 gold medals in Swimming, which is still considered as a unique and unprecedented record in Deaflympics history
- Reed Gershwind holds the record for winning the most number of medals for United States in the Deaflympics history with 30 medals. This medal tally is also the second highest for any deaflympian just behind Terence Parkin of South Africa.

== See also ==
- United States at the Paralympics
- United States at the Olympics
