= Great Britain at the Deaflympics =

- IPC code: GBR
- NPC: UK Deaf Sport
- Website: ukdeafsport.org.uk
- Medals: Gold 67 Silver 89 Bronze 93 Total 249

Summer appearances
- 1924; 1928; 1931; 1935; 1939; 1949; 1953; 1957; 1961; 1965; 1969; 1973; 1977; 1981; 1985; 1989; 1993; 1997; 2001; 2005; 2009; 2013; 2017; 2021

Great Britain has been participating at the Deaflympics since 1924 and has earned 249 medals.

== Medal tallies ==
=== Summer Deaflympics ===
Event	Gold	Silver	Bronze	Total
1924	3	3	4	10
1928	1	0	0	1
1931	0	2	8	10
1935	10	7	7	24
1939	4	3	4	11
1949	5	1	0	6
1953	7	5	1	13
1957	1	8	1	10
1961	1	2	3	6
1965	3	6	4	13
1969	2	1	1	4
1973	1	6	3	10
1981	0	1	5	6
1985	5	11	10	26
1989	12	10	6	28
1993	1	7	12	20
1997	3	1	3	7
2001	0	2	4	6
2005	5	5	6	16
2009	1	4	5	10
2013	0	2	3	5
2017	3	1	5	9
2025	5	3	4	12

=== Winter Deaflympics ===
Event	Gold	Silver	Bronze	Total
1987	0	1	2	3
1991	0	1	2	3
1995	2	1	0	3

== See also ==
- United Kingdom at the Paralympics
- United Kingdom at the Olympics
