= Hungary at the Deaflympics =

- IPC code: HUN
- NPC: Hungarian Deaf Sport Federation
- Website: www.hdsf.hu
- Medals: Gold 51 Silver 44 Bronze 37 Total 132

Summer appearances
- 1924; 1928; 1931; 1935; 1939; 1949; 1953; 1957; 1961; 1965; 1969; 1973; 1977; 1981; 1985; 1989; 1993; 1997; 2001; 2005; 2009; 2013; 2017; 2021

Hungary has been participating at the Deaflympics since its inception in 1924 and has earned a total of 132 medals.

Hungary has also competed at the Winter Deaflympics in 2015, the only Winter Deaflympic event that Hungary has participated.

== Medal tallies ==
Event	Gold	Silver	Bronze	Total
1924	0	0	0	0
1928	0	0	0	0
1931	3	2	0	5
1935	1	2	2	5
1957	10	6	2	18
1961	9	6	3	18
1965	7	8	4	19
1969	9	5	9	23
1973	4	3	6	13
1977	1	3	3	7
1981	1	3	2	6
1985	0	1	2	3
1993	0	2	0	2
1997	1	1	0	2
2001	0	1	0	1
2005	0	1	0	1
2009	2	0	3	5
2013	3	0	1	4
2017	0	0	1	1
2021	0	4	4	8

== See also ==
- Hungary at the Paralympics
- Hungary at the Olympics
