= Soviet Union at the Deaflympics =

- IOC code: URS
- Medals: Gold 247 Silver 191 Bronze 157 Total 595

Summer appearances
- 1957; 1961; 1965; 1969; 1973; 1977; 1981; 1985; 1989

Winter appearances
- 1971; 1975; 1979; 1983; 1987; 1991

Other related appearances
- Latvia (1924–1939, 1993–); Belarus (1993–); Estonia (1993–); Lithuania (1993–); Moldova (1993–); Russia (1993–); Ukraine (1993–); Azerbaijan (1997–); Georgia (1997–); Kazakhstan (1997–); Uzbekistan (1997–); Armenia (2001–); Turkmenistan (2001–); Kyrgyzstan (2009–)

The Soviet Union competed at the Deaflympics for the first time in 1957. Soviet Union competed at each editions of the Summer Deaflympics from 1957 to 1989 except for the 1985 Summer Deaflympics until the dissolution of the Soviet Union. Soviet Union has won medals in every editions of the Summer Deaflympics it has competed and it is considered one of the greatest nations to have participated at the Deaflympics after earning a medal haul of 524 (223 gold, 165 silver and 136 bronze) at the Summer Deaflympics.

The nation has also competed at the Winter Deaflympics since making its debut in 1971 and last competed at the Winter Deaflympics in 1991. Soviet Union has earned 71 medals at the Winter Deaflympics.

== Medal tallies ==
=== Summer Deaflympics ===
| Event | Participants | Gold | Silver | Bronze | Total |
| 1957 | 26 | 13 | 8 | 4 | 25 |
| 1961 | 41 | 30 | 18 | 18 | 66 |
| 1965 | 31 | 29 | 15 | 9 | 53 |
| 1969 | 62 | 36 | 31 | 20 | 87 |
| 1973 | 52 | 26 | 15 | 7 | 48 |
| 1977 | 84 | 26 | 15 | 22 | 63 |
| 1981 | 110 | 21 | 19 | 14 | 54 |
| 1989 | 46 | 18 | 18 | 21 | 57 |

=== Winter Deaflympics ===
| Event | Participants | Gold | Silver | Bronze | Total |
| 1971 | 6 | 2 | 3 | 2 | 7 |
| 1975 | 8 | 5 | 5 | 3 | 13 |
| 1979 | 10 | 5 | 5 | 3 | 13 |
| 1983 | 14 | 6 | 7 | 4 | 17 |
| 1987 | 14 | 1 | 3 | 6 | 10 |
| 1991 | 25 | 5 | 3 | 3 | 11 |

== Notable athletes ==
- Valery Rukhledev - He has represented Soviet Union at the Summer Deaflympics in 1961, 1965 and 1979 in the men's wrestling freestyle and Greco-Roman events. He has clinched 6 gold medals in 3 consecutive Deaflympic appearances in the men's freestyle and Greco-Roman events. He is considered one of the finest deaflympic competitors of all time and he is the greatest Deaflympic athlete to have represented the nation at the Deaflympics. He is also the current President of the ICSD.

== See also ==
- Soviet Union at the Olympics
- Soviet Union at the Paralympics
