= Belgium at the Deaflympics =

- IPC code: BEL
- NPC: Belgian Deaf Sport Committee
- Website: www.deafsport.be
- Medals: Gold 15 Silver 29 Bronze 41 Total 85

Summer appearances
- 1924; 1928; 1931; 1935; 1939; 1949; 1953; 1957; 1961; 1965; 1969; 1973; 1977; 1981; 1985; 1989; 1993; 1997; 2001; 2005; 2009; 2013; 2017; 2021

Belgium has been participating at the Deaflympics since its inception in 1924 and has earned a total of 85 medals.

Belgium has yet to compete at the Winter Deaflympics.

== Medal tallies ==
Event	Gold	Silver	Bronze	Total
1924	1	3	12	16
1928	0	0	0	0
1931	3	1	3	7
1935	2	3	1	6
1939	2	1	2	5
1949	1	3	1	5
1953	2	2	1	5
1957	0	1	2	3
1961	0	1	0	1
1965	0	0	1	1
1973	1	3	2	6
1977	1	3	1	5
1981	0	1	2	3
1985	1	2	2	5
1989	0	1	2	3
1993	0	0	2	2
1997	1	4	3	8
2001	0	0	3	3
2005	0	0	1	1
2009	0	0	0	0
2013	0	0	0	0
2017	0	0	0	0

== See also ==
- Belgium at the Paralympics
- Belgium at the Olympics
