= Deaf people in the Olympics =

A number of deaf people have competed in the modern Olympic Games, with the earliest known being Oskar Wetzell, a Finnish diver who competed in the 1908 Olympics in London. There is also a specific event for the deaf, the Deaflympics, organized by the International Committee of Sports for the Deaf. This is also held every four years.

In some cases, adaptations have been made to accommodate deaf athletes.

== Summer games ==
=== Athletes ===
The table below shows Deaf athletes known to have competed in the Olympics. All either competed at the Deaflympics, or would have qualified to do so. To qualify for the Deaflympics, "athletes must have a hearing loss of at least 55db in their 'better ear'. Hearing aids, cochlear implants and the like are not allowed to be used in competition, to place all athletes on the same level" In the Olympics, there is no restriction on hearing loss or use of hearing aids.

Person (Nation)	Deaflympic Games			Olympic Games			
Person (Nation)	Games	Sport	Medal	Games	Sport	Medal	Ref
Oskar Wetzell (FIN)				1908 London; 1912 Stockholm	Diving		
Carlo Orlandi (ITA)				1928 Amsterdam	Boxing	1st place, gold medalist(s)	
Donald Gollan (GBR)				1928 Amsterdam	Rowing	2nd place, silver medalist(s)	
Ignazio Fabra (ITA)	1961 Helsinki; 1965 Washington DC; 1969 Belgrade	Wrestling	1st place, gold medalist(s) 2nd place, silver medalist(s) 3rd place, bronze medalist(s)	1952 Helsinki; 1956 Melbourne	Wrestling	2nd place, silver medalist(s)	
Ildikó Újlaky-Rejtő (HUN)				1960 Rome; 1964 Tokyo; 1968 Mexico City; 1972 Munich; 1976 Montreal	Fencing	1st place, gold medalist(s) 2nd place, silver medalist(s) 3rd place, bronze medalist(s)	
Gerhard Sperling (GER)	1961 Helsinki; 1969 Belgrade; 1977 Bucharest	Athletics	1st place, gold medalist(s) 2nd place, silver medalist(s)	1964 Tokyo; 1968 Mexico City; 1972 Munich	Athletics		
Vyacheslav Skomorokhov (URS)	1969 Belgrade; 1973 Malmö; 1977 Bucharest; 1981 Köln	Athletics	1st place, gold medalist(s) 2nd place, silver medalist(s) 3rd place, bronze medalist(s)	1968 Mexico City	Athletics		
Jeffrey Float (USA)	1977 Bucharest	Swimming	1st place, gold medalist(s)	1984 Los Angeles	Swimming	1st place, gold medalist(s)	
Dean Barton-Smith (AUS)	1985 Los Angeles; 1989 Christchurch; 1993 Sofia; 2005 Melbourne	Athletics	1st place, gold medalist(s) 2nd place, silver medalist(s) 3rd place, bronze medalist(s)	1992 Barcelona	Athletics		
Terence Parkin (RSA)	1997 Copenhagen; 2001 Rome; 2005 Melbourne; 2009 Taipei; 2013 Sofia	Swimming; Cycling	1st place, gold medalist(s) 2nd place, silver medalist(s) 3rd place, bronze medalist(s)	2000 Sydney; 2004 Athens	Swimming	2nd place, silver medalist(s)	
Frank Bartolillo (AUS)				2004 Athens	Fencing		
Hugo Passos (POR)	1997 Copenhagen; 2001 Rome; 2005 Melbourne; 2009 Taipei	Wrestling	1st place, gold medalist(s) 2nd place, silver medalist(s) 3rd place, bronze medalist(s)	2004 Athens	Wrestling		
Tony Ally (GBR)				2004 Athens	Diving		
Tamika Catchings (USA)				2004 Athens; 2008 Beijing; 2012 London; 2016 Rio	Basketball	1st place, gold medalist(s)	
Chris Colwill (USA)				2008 Beijing; 2012 London	Diving		
David Smith (USA)				2012 London; 2016 Rio; 2020 Tokyo; 2024 Paris	Volleyball	3rd place, bronze medalist(s)	
Jakub Nosek (CZE)	2009 Taipei; 2013 Sofia; 2017 Samsun	Athletics		2018 Pyeongchang; 2022 Beijing	Bobsleigh		
Diksha Dagar (IND)	2017 Samsun; 2021 Caxias do Sul; 2025 Tokyo	Golf	1st place, gold medalist(s) 2nd place, silver medalist(s)	2020 Tokyo	Golf		

=== Opening ceremony ===
Person (Nation)
Person (Nation)	Games	Role	References
KAOS Choir (GBR)	2012 London	Performed British National anthem	
Evelyn Glennie (GBR)	2012 London	Lead percussionist	
Mike Hawthorne (GBR)	2012 London	Dancer	

== See also ==
- Deaf people in sports
