= Taekwondo at the Deaflympics =

Taekwondo competition

Taekwondo events have been contested in Deaflympics since 2009 in Taipei, the capital of Taiwan. This was the 21st edition of the event.

== Editions ==
Games	Year	Host city	Host country	Best nation	Events
21	2009	Taipei	Taiwan	South Korea	7
22	2013	Sofia	Bulgaria	South Korea	13
23	2017	Samsun	Turkey	Turkey	13
24	2021	Caxias do Sul	Brazil	Iran	11
25	2025	Tokyo	Japan	South Korea	11

== Medal table ==
All medal count from 2009 Summer Deaflympics to 2017 Summer Deaflympics including kyorugui and poomsae events, the last ones making their debut in the 2013 Summer Deaflympics.

Rank	Nation	Gold	Silver	Bronze	Total
1	South Korea	17	9	10	36
2	Turkey	9	11	15	35
3	Russia	5	7	13	25
4	Iran	5	4	11	20
5	Puerto Rico	3	0	1	4
6	Chinese Taipei	2	4	5	11
7	Croatia	1	3	0	4
8	Greece	1	2	3	6
9	Kazakhstan	1	0	6	7
10	Ukraine	0	2	5	7
11	Kyrgyzstan	0	1	2	3
12	Latvia	0	1	0	1
13	China	0	0	4	4
13	Uzbekistan	0	0	4	4
15	Portugal	0	0	2	2
15	Venezuela	0	0	2	2
17	Argentina	0	0	1	1
17	Hong Kong	0	0	1	1
17	Indonesia	0	0	1	1
17	Mexico	0	0	1	1
Totals (20 entries)		44	44	87	175
