= Denmark at the Deaflympics =

- IPC code: DEN
- Website: www.deafsport.dk
- Medals: Gold 46 Silver 40 Bronze 54 Total 140

Summer appearances
- 1931; 1935; 1939; 1949; 1953; 1957; 1961; 1965; 1969; 1973; 1977; 1981; 1985; 1989; 1993; 1997; 2001; 2005; 2009; 2013; 2017; 2021

Denmark has been participating at the Deaflympics since 1931 and has earned a total of 139 medals.

Denmark has never competed at the Winter Deaflympics.

== Medal tallies ==
=== Summer Deaflympics ===
Event	Gold	Silver	Bronze	Total
1931	10	2	5	17
1935	0	2	3	5
1939	0	1	2	3
1949	11	9	10	30
1953	4	4	6	14
1957	4	1	2	7
1961	2	5	3	10
1965	4	1	3	8
1969	1	4	1	6
1973	1	2	4	7
1977	1	2	1	4
1981	1	1	4	6
1985	1	1	3	5
1989	0	1	0	1
1993	2	0	2	4
1997	3	4	3	10
2001	1	0	0	1
2009	0	0	1	1
2021	1	0	1	2

== See also ==
- Denmark at the Paralympics
- Denmark at the Olympics
