= Spain at the Deaflympics =

- IPC code: ESP
- NPC: Spanish Federation of Sports for the Deaf
- Website: www.feds.es (in Spanish)
- Medals: Gold 2 Silver 3 Bronze 6 Total 11

Summer appearances
- 1924; 1928; 1931; 1935; 1939; 1949; 1953; 1957; 1961; 1965; 1969; 1973; 1977; 1981; 1985; 1989; 1993; 1997; 2001; 2005; 2009; 2013; 2017; 2021

Spain competed at the inaugural edition of the Deaflympics in 1957. But they did not participate in a Deaflympics competition until 1973. Since then Spain has been regularly participating at the Deaflympics. Spain won its first Deaflympics medal way back in 1981.

Spain has competed at the Winter Deaflympics in 1985, 2015 and 2024.

== Medal tallies ==
=== Summer Deaflympics ===
Event	Gold	Silver	Bronze	Total
1957	0	0	0	0
1973	0	0	0	0
1981	0	0	1	1
1985	0	0	0	0
1989	0	0	0	0
1993	0	0	1	1
1997	0	1	3	4
2001	1	0	0	1
2005	0	1	0	1
2009	0	1	0	1
2013	0	0	0	0
2017	0	0	1	1
2021	0	2	1	3

== See also ==
- Spain at the Paralympics
- Spain at the Olympics
