= Ireland at the Deaflympics =

- IPC code: IRL
- NPC: Deaf Sports Ireland
- Website: deafsportsireland.com
- Medals: Gold 16 Silver 15 Bronze 11 Total 42

Summer appearances
- 1973; 1977; 1981; 1985; 1989; 1993; 1997; 2001; 2005; 2009; 2013; 2017; 2021

Ireland has been participating at the Deaflympics since 1973 and has earned a total of 42 medals.

Ireland has never participated at the Winter Deaflympics.

== Medal tallies ==
=== Summer Deaflympics ===
Event	Gold	Silver	Bronze	Total
1973	0	0	0	0
1977	0	1	0	1
1981	0	0	0	0
1985	4	1	1	6
1989	3	3	0	6
1993	2	1	3	6
1997	3	2	1	6
2001	0	1	3	4
2005	4	5	2	11
2009	0	1	1	2
2013	0	0	0	0
2017	0	0	0	0

== See also ==
- Ireland at the Paralympics
- Ireland at the Olympics
