= Deaflympics =

International sports event for deaf people

Deaflympics Games Comité International des Sports des Sourds
- Deaflympics logo
- Motto: Per Ludos Aequalitas (Equality Through Sport)
- Purpose: To provide opportunities for deaf persons to participate in elite sports
- Frequency: Every 4 years
- Inaugurated: 1924; 102 years ago in Paris, France – 1924 Summer Deaflympics
- Most recent: 2023 Winter Deaflympics in Erzurum, Turkey; 2025 Summer Deaflympics in Tokyo, Japan
- Next event: 2027 Winter Deaflympics in Innsbruck, Austria; 2029 Summer Deaflympics in Athens, Greece
- Website: www.deaflympics.com www.ciss.org

The Deaflympics, also known as Deaflympiad (previously called World Games for the Deaf, and International Games for the Deaf) are a periodic series of multi-sport events sanctioned by the International Olympic Committee (IOC) at which deaf athletes compete at an elite level. Unlike the athletes in other IOC-sanctioned events (the Olympics, the Paralympics, and the Special Olympics), athletes cannot be guided by sounds (such as starting pistols, bullhorn commands or referee whistles). The games have been organized by the Comité International des Sports des Sourds (CISS, "The International Committee of Sports for the Deaf") since the first event in 1924.

== History ==
The Deaflympics are held every four years, and are the longest running multi-sport event in history after the Olympics. The first games, held in Paris in 1924, were the first ever international sporting event for athletes with a disability. The event has been held every four years since, apart from a break for World War II, and an additional event, the Deaflympic Winter Games, was added in 1949. The games began as a small gathering of 148 athletes from nine European nations competing in the International Silent Games in Paris, France, in 1924; now, they have grown into a global movement.

Officially, the games were originally called the "International Games for the Deaf" from 1924 to 1965, but were sometimes also referred to as the "International Silent Games". From 1966 to 1999, they were called the "World Games for the Deaf", and occasionally referred to as the "World Silent Games". From 2001, the games have been known by their current name Deaflympics (often mistakenly called the Deaf Olympics).

To qualify for the games, athletes must have a hearing loss of at least 55 dB in their "better ear". Hearing aids, cochlear implants, and the like are not allowed to be used in competition, to place all athletes on the same level. Other examples of ways the games vary from hearing competitions are the manner in which they are officiated. To address the issue of Deaflympians not being able to be guided by sounds, certain sports use alternative methods of commencing the game. For example, the football referees wave a flag instead of blowing a whistle; on the track, races are started by using a light, instead of a starter pistol. It is also customary for spectators not to cheer or clap, but rather to wave with both hands, the Deaf form of applause.

After the 2022 Russian invasion of Ukraine, the International Committee of Sports for the Deaf (ICSD) banned athletes from Russia and Belarus from that year's Deaflympics in Caxias do Sul, Brazil.

== Host nations and cities ==
The Summer Deaflympic Games have been hosted by 24 cities in 20 countries, but by cities outside Europe on only seven occasions (Washington, D.C. 1965, Los Angeles in 1985, Christchurch in 1989, Melbourne in 2005, Taipei in 2009, Caxias do Sul in 2022, and Tokyo in 2025 – the most recently held event). The Winter Deaflympic Games have been hosted by 17 cities in 12 countries. The last winter Games were held in Erzurum, Turkey in 2023.

The 2011 Winter Games scheduled to be held in Vysoké Tatry, Slovakia were cancelled due to the lack of readiness by the organizing committee to host the games. The International Committee of Deaf Sports filed a criminal complaint against the Slovak Deaflympics Organizing Committee and its president, Mr. Jaromír Ruda. The criminal complaint demands reimbursement of the funds that were transferred to the Slovak Deaflympics Organizing Committee from national deaf sports federations, to cover hotel accommodations and other Deaflympics-related expenses. According to the Slovak newspaper, SME, "Jaromír Ruda, head of the Slovak Organising Committee, [is] a champion of promises and someone who is accused of a 1.6 million Euro Deaflympics-related fraud". In a letter to the United States Deaflympians, International Committee of Sports for the Deaf ICSD President Craig Crowley expressed "his deep apologies for the cancellation of the 17th Winter Deaflympics". Currently, the Slovak Deaflympic Committee and the Slovakia Association of Deaf Sportsmen Unions have been suspended. In 2013, the Special Criminal Court in Banská Bystrica sentenced Ruda to a prison term of 14 1/2 years for defrauding €1.6 million that should have been used for Winter Deaflympics.

The host cities and National Deaf Sports Associations for all past and scheduled games are as follows:

== List of Summer Deaflympics hosts ==
Games	Year	Host	Opened by	Dates	Nations	Competitors			Sports	Events	Top-ranked
Games	Year	Host	Opened by	Dates	Nations	Total	Men	Women	Sports	Events	Top-ranked
1	1924	Paris, France	Gaston Doumergue	10–17 August	9	148	147	1	6	31	France
2	1928	Amsterdam, Netherlands	Wilhelmina of the Netherlands	18–26 August	10	212	198	14	5	38	Great Britain
3	1931	Nuremberg, Germany	Paul von Hindenburg	19–23 August	14	316	288	28	6	43	Germany
4	1935	(United Kingdom) London, Great Britain	George V	17–24 August	12	221	178	43	5	41	Great Britain
5	1939	Stockholm, Sweden	Gustaf V	24–27 August	13	250	208	42	6	43	Great Britain
6	1949	Copenhagen, Denmark	Frederik IX of Denmark	12–16 August	14	391	342	49	7	51	Great Britain
7	1953	Brussels, Belgium	Baudouin of Belgium	15–19 August	16	473	432	41	7	57	Germany
8	1957	Milan, Italy	Giovanni Gronchi	25–30 August	25	635	565	70	9	69	Soviet Union
9	1961	Helsinki, Finland	Urho Kekkonen	6–10 August	24	613	503	110	10	94	Soviet Union
10	1965	Washington, D.C., United States	Lyndon B. Johnson	27 June – 3 July	27	687	575	112	9	85	Soviet Union
11	1969	(Socialist Federal Republic of Yugoslavia) Belgrade, Yugoslavia	Josip Broz Tito	9–16 August	33	1189	964	225	12	105	Soviet Union
12	1973	Malmö, Sweden	Gustaf VI Adolf	21–28 August	31	1116	893	223	11	97	United States
13	1977	Bucharest, Romania	Nicolae Ceauşescu	17–27 July	32	1150	913	237	11	106	United States
14	1981	Cologne, West Germany	Helmut Schmidt	23 July – 1 August	32	1198	893	305	11	110	United States
15	1985	Los Angeles, United States	Ronald Reagan	10–20 August	29	995	745	250	11	96	United States
16	1989	Christchurch, New Zealand	David Lange	7–17 January	30	955	726	229	12	120	United States
17	1993	Sofia, Bulgaria	Zhelyu Zhelev	24 July – 2 August	52	1,679	1,295	384	12	126	United States
18	1997	Copenhagen, Denmark	John M. Lovett	13–26 July	65	2,028	1,496	534	14	140	United States
19	2001	Rome, Italy	Carlo Azeglio Ciampi	22 July – 1 August	67	2,208	1,562	646	14	143	United States
20	2005	Melbourne, Australia	Marigold Southey	5–16 January	63	2,038	1,402	636	14	147	Ukraine
21	2009	Taipei, Chinese Taipei ^{1}	Ma Ying-jeou	5–15 September	80	2,670	1,714	779	17	177	Russia
22	2013	Sofia, Bulgaria ^{2}	Rosen Plevneliev	26 July – 4 August ^{2}	83	2,711	1,792	919	16	203^{2}	Russia
23	2017	Samsun, Turkey	Recep Tayyip Erdoğan	18–30 July	97	2,856	1,897	959	18	219	Russia
24	2022	Caxias do Sul, Brazil	Michelle Bolsonaro	1–15 May 2022 ^{3}	71	2,412	1,647	765	18 ^{3}	219 ^{3}	Ukraine
25	2025	Tokyo, Japan	Hisako, Princess Takamado	15–26 November	79	2,911	1,878	1,033	18	209	Ukraine
26	2029	Athens, Greece	Future event								

^{1} The Republic of China (Taiwan) is recognised as Chinese Taipei by the CISS and the majority of international organisations it participates in due to political considerations and Cross-Strait relations with the People's Republic of China.

^{2} The marathon was held 4 days before the opening ceremony in Füssen, Germany on 21 July 2013.

^{3} Due to the COVID-19 pandemic, the Summer Deaflympics that were to be held in December 2021 were postponed until May 2022, and due to the small number of venues within the host city, the bowling events were transferred to Kuala Lumpur, Malaysia, and were held between 20 and 30 October 2022.

== List of Winter Deaflympics hosts ==
Games	Year	Host	Opened by	Dates	Nations	Competitors			Sports	Events	Top-ranked
Games	Year	Host	Opened by	Dates	Nations	Total	Men	Women	Sports	Events	Top-ranked
1	1949	Seefeld, Austria		26–30 February	5	33	33	0	2	5	Switzerland
2	1953	Oslo, Norway		20–24 February	6	44	42	2	4	9	Norway
3	1955	Oberammergau, West Germany		10–13 February	8	59	54	5	4	11	Norway
4	1959	Montana-Vermala, Switzerland		27–31 January	10	42			3	14	Norway
5	1963	Åre, Sweden		12–16 March	9	60			2	13	Austria
6	1967	Berchtesgaden, West Germany		20–25 February	12	89			2	11	Norway
7	1971	Adelboden, Switzerland		25–30 February	13	145			2	11	Switzerland
8	1975	Lake Placid, United States		2–8 February	13	136			4	12	Canada
9	1979	Méribel, France		21–27 January	14	180			3	12	Soviet Union
10	1983	Madonna di Campiglio, Italy		13–23 January	15	147			3	17	Soviet Union
11	1987	Oslo, Norway		7–14 February	15	169			3	18	Norway
12	1991	Banff, Canada		2–9 March	16	175			5	18	Soviet Union
13	1995	Ylläs, Finland		14–19 March	18	260			4	15	Russia
14	1999	Davos, Switzerland		6–14 March	18	273			5	17	Russia
15	2003	Sundsvall, Sweden		26 February – 9 March	21	259			4	23	Russia
16	2007	Salt Lake City, United States		1–10 February	23	302			5	26	Russia
17	2011	Vysoké Tatry, Slovakia		16–28 February	Cancelled						
18	2015	Khanty-Mansiysk and Magnitogorsk, Russia	Vitaly Mutko	28 March – 5 April	27	344			5	31	Russia
19	2019	Sondrio Province, Italy	Marco Scaramellini	12–21 December	34	493			7	36	Russia
20	2024	Erzurum, Turkey	Mustafa Çiftçi	2–12 March 2024	36	534	314	220	6	34	Ukraine
21	2027	Innsbruck, Austria	Future event	14-24 January					7	44	

== Youth Games ==
1st Summer Youth Deaf Games was held in 2024 in Brazil with 17 nations in 4 sports (28 events).

== All-time medal table ==
=== Summer Deaflympics ===
An all-time Summer Deaflympics from 1924 Summer Deaflympics to 2025 Summer Deaflympics, is tabulated below. The table is simply the consequence of the sum of the medal tables of the various editions of the Summer Deaflympics.

Rank	Nation	Gold	Silver	Bronze	Total
1	United States	393	328	375	1,096
2	Russia	237	206	223	666
3	Ukraine	198	215	199	612
4	Soviet Union	173	124	108	405
5	West Germany	121	121	120	362
6	Iran	113	91	111	315
7	Italy	100	103	124	327
8	Japan	95	85	83	263
9	South Korea	90	86	81	257
10	France	78	95	101	274
11	Great Britain	72	88	99	259
12	Sweden	65	84	65	214
13	Germany	59	102	103	264
14	China	58	50	66	174
15	Hungary	52	55	47	154
16	Finland	50	52	47	149
17	Denmark	47	40	54	141
18	Australia	46	30	31	107
19	Poland	44	81	98	223
20	Turkey	44	59	96	199
21	Belarus	37	48	24	109
22	South Africa	35	17	10	62
23	India	35	16	25	76
24	Netherlands	33	36	29	98
25	Chinese Taipei	32	54	56	142
26	Canada	32	41	38	111
27	Norway	32	28	25	85
28	Individual Neutral Athletes	32	12	8	52
29	Kenya	26	26	29	81
30	Yugoslavia	24	13	21	58
31	Czech Republic	22	13	18	53
32	Lithuania	18	26	33	77
33	Ireland	16	15	11	42
34	Bulgaria	15	43	52	110
35	Belgium	15	29	42	86
36	Kazakhstan	15	12	39	66
37	Estonia	15	8	15	38
38	Cuba	15	7	13	35
39	Venezuela	14	14	32	60
40	Croatia	11	6	8	25
41	Portugal	10	6	7	23
42	Switzerland	9	16	16	41
43	Greece	8	12	15	35
44	East Germany	7	8	8	23
45	Romania	6	9	14	29
46	Slovakia	6	5	5	16
47	Latvia	5	8	6	19
48	New Zealand	5	6	7	18
49	Mexico	5	5	4	14
50	Czechoslovakia	3	7	9	19
51	Puerto Rico	3	0	1	4
52	Malaysia	2	9	4	15
53	Austria	2	7	10	19
54	Mongolia	2	6	16	24
55	Colombia	2	3	7	12
56	Kyrgyzstan	2	2	13	17
57	Slovenia	2	2	6	10
58	Brazil	2	1	13	16
59	Ecuador	2	1	1	4
59	Singapore	2	1	1	4
61	Macau	2	0	1	3
62	Spain	1	5	7	13
63	Algeria	1	5	5	11
64	Uzbekistan	1	4	8	13
65	Argentina	1	4	6	11
66	Dominican Republic	1	1	0	2
67	Thailand	1	0	2	3
68	United Arab Emirates	1	0	1	2
69	Chile	1	0	0	1
70	Armenia	0	2	13	15
71	Georgia	0	2	1	3
71	Nigeria	0	2	1	3
73	Indonesia	0	1	3	4
73	Israel	0	1	3	4
73	Serbia	0	1	3	4
76	Moldova	0	1	1	2
77	Azerbaijan	0	1	0	1
77	Iceland	0	1	0	1
79	Saudi Arabia	0	0	3	3
80	Cyprus	0	0	2	2
80	Hong Kong	0	0	2	2
82	Egypt	0	0	1	1
82	Philippines	0	0	1	1
82	Turkmenistan	0	0	1	1
Totals (84 entries)		2,704	2,704	2,987	8,395

=== Winter Deaflympics ===
An all-time Winter Deaflympics from 1949 Winter Deaflympics to 2023 Winter Deaflympics, is tabulated below. The table is simply the consequence of the sum of the medal tables of the various editions of the Winter Deaflympics.

Rank	Nation	Gold	Silver	Bronze	Total
1	Russia	53	40	42	135
2	Norway	48	36	40	124
3	Soviet Union	24	26	21	71
4	Austria	23	26	27	76
5	Italy	22	14	16	52
6	United States	21	29	34	84
7	Finland	21	21	20	62
8	Switzerland	20	29	24	73
9	Czech Republic	18	9	6	33
10	Canada	18	8	8	34
11	Ukraine	14	19	13	46
12	Germany	13	19	30	62
13	France	11	17	15	43
14	China	10	8	11	29
15	Japan	8	6	6	20
16	Australia	6	4	1	11
17	Poland	5	5	1	11
18	Sweden	2	15	10	27
19	Slovakia	2	5	0	7
20	Slovenia	2	2	3	7
21	Great Britain	2	2	2	6
22	Croatia	1	1	4	6
23	Kazakhstan	1	0	1	2
24	Iran	1	0	0	1
24	Israel	1	0	0	1
24	Latvia	1	0	0	1
24	Spain	1	0	0	1
28	South Korea	0	2	3	5
29	Hungary	0	1	2	3
30	Brazil	0	1	1	2
30	Yugoslavia	0	1	1	2
32	Lithuania	0	1	0	1
33	Serbia	0	0	1	1
33	Turkey	0	0	1	1
Totals (34 entries)		349	347	344	1,040

=== Combined ===
As of August 2024 (after the Winter Games in Erzurum)
Rank	Nation	Summer				Winter				Combined			
Rank	Nation	Gold medal	Silver medal	Bronze medal	Total	Gold medal	Silver medal	Bronze medal	Total	Gold medal	Silver medal	Bronze medal	Total
1	United States	393	328	375	1096	21	29	34	84	414	357	409	1180
2	Russia	237	206	223	666	53	40	42	135	290	246	265	801
3	Ukraine	198	215	199	611	14	19	13	46	212	234	212	658
4	Soviet Union	173	124	108	405	24	26	21	71	197	150	129	476
5	Italy	100	103	124	327	22	14	16	52	122	117	140	379
6	West Germany	121	121	120	362	0	0	0	0	121	121	120	362
7	Iran	113	91	111	315	1	0	0	1	114	81	92	316
8	Japan	95	85	83	263	8	6	6	20	103	91	89	283
9	South Korea	90	86	81	257	0	2	3	5	90	88	84	262
10	France	78	95	100	273	11	17	15	43	89	112	115	316
11	Norway	32	28	25	85	48	36	40	124	80	64	65	209
12	Great Britain	72	88	99	259	2	2	2	6	74	90	101	265
13	Germany	59	102	103	264	13	19	30	62	72	121	133	326
14	Finland	50	52	47	149	21	21	20	62	71	73	67	211
15	Sweden	65	84	63	212	2	15	10	27	67	99	73	239
16	China	58	50	66	174	10	8	11	29	68	58	77	203
17	Hungary	52	55	47	154	0	1	2	3	52	56	49	157
18	Australia	45	29	33	107	6	4	1	11	51	33	34	118
19	Poland	44	81	98	223	5	5	1	11	49	86	99	234
20	Canada	32	41	38	111	18	8	8	34	50	49	46	145
21	Denmark	47	40	54	141	0	0	0	0	47	40	54	141
22	Turkey	42	51	80	173	0	0	1	1	42	51	81	174
23	Czech Republic	20	12	15	47	18	9	6	33	38	21	21	80
24	Belarus	37	48	24	109	0	0	0	0	37	48	24	109
25	South Africa	35	17	10	62	0	0	0	0	35	17	10	62
26	Netherlands	33	35	29	97	0	0	0	0	33	35	29	97
27	Chinese Taipei	31	48	50	129	0	0	0	0	31	48	50	129
28	Switzerland	9	16	16	41	20	29	24	73	29	45	40	114
29	India	26	9	21	56	0	0	0	0	26	9	21	56
30	Austria	2	6	8	16	23	26	27	76	25	32	35	92
31	Yugoslavia	24	13	21	58	0	1	1	2	24	14	22	60
32	Kenya	21	20	25	66	0	0	0	0	21	20	25	66
33	Ireland	16	15	11	42	0	0	0	0	16	15	11	42
34	Bulgaria	15	43	51	109	0	0	0	0	15	43	51	109
35	Belgium	15	29	41	85	0	0	0	0	15	29	41	85
36	Lithuania	15	22	30	67	0	1	0	1	15	23	30	68
37	Venezuela	14	13	27	54	0	0	0	0	14	13	27	54
38	Cuba	14	6	12	32	0	0	0	0	14	6	12	32
39	Estonia	12	8	15	35	0	0	0	0	12	8	15	35
40	Kazakhstan	7	8	26	41	1	0	1	2	8	8	27	43
41	Croatia	7	6	3	16	1	1	4	6	8	7	7	22
42	Greece	7	11	13	31	0	0	0	0	7	11	13	31
43	Slovakia	5	5	5	15	2	5	0	7	7	10	5	22
44	East Germany	7	8	8	23	0	0	0	0	7	8	8	23
45	Portugal	7	4	6	17	0	0	0	0	7	4	6	17
46	Romania	6	9	14	29	0	0	0	0	6	9	14	29
47	Latvia	5	7	4	16	1	0	0	1	6	7	4	17
48	New Zealand	5	6	7	18	0	0	0	0	5	6	7	18
49	Slovenia	2	2	3	7	2	2	3	7	4	4	6	14
50	Malaysia	3	11	4	18	0	0	0	0	3	11	4	18
51	Czechoslovakia	3	7	9	19	0	0	0	0	3	7	9	19
52	Mexico	3	3	3	9	0	0	0	0	3	3	3	9
53	Puerto Rico	3	0	1	4	0	0	0	0	3	0	1	4
54	Mongolia	2	6	14	22	0	0	0	0	2	6	14	22
55	Spain	1	5	7	13	1	0	0	1	2	5	7	14
56	Singapore	2	1	1	4	0	0	0	0	2	1	1	4
57	Argentina	1	4	5	10	0	0	0	0	1	4	5	10
58	Brazil	1	1	13	15	0	1	1	2	1	2	14	17
59	Colombia	1	2	2	5	0	0	0	0	1	2	2	5
60	Algeria	1	1	3	5	0	0	0	0	1	1	3	5
61	Dominican Republic	1	1	0	2	0	0	0	0	1	1	0	2
61	Ecuador	1	1	0	2	0	0	0	0	1	1	0	2
63	Israel	0	0	3	3	1	0	0	1	1	0	3	4
64	Macau	1	0	1	2	0	0	0	0	1	0	1	2
64	Thailand	1	0	1	2	0	0	0	0	1	0	1	2
64	United Arab Emirates	1	0	1	2	0	0	0	0	1	0	1	2
67	Chile	1	0	0	1	0	0	0	0	1	0	0	1
68	Kyrgyzstan	0	2	9	11	0	0	0	0	0	2	9	11
69	Georgia	0	2	1	3	0	0	0	0	0	2	1	3
69	Nigeria	0	2	1	3	0	0	0	0	0	2	1	3
71	Armenia	0	1	10	11	0	0	0	0	0	1	10	11
72	Serbia	0	1	3	4	0	0	1	1	0	1	4	5
73	Indonesia	0	1	3	4	0	0	0	0	0	1	3	4
74	Moldova	0	1	1	2	0	0	0	0	0	1	1	2
75	Azerbaijan	0	1	0	1	0	0	0	0	0	1	0	1
75	Iceland	0	1	0	1	0	0	0	0	0	1	0	1
77	Uzbekistan	0	0	4	4	0	0	0	0	0	0	4	4
78	Saudi Arabia	0	0	3	3	0	0	0	0	0	0	3	3
79	Cyprus	0	0	1	1	0	0	0	0	0	0	1	1
79	Egypt	0	0	1	1	0	0	0	0	0	0	1	1
79	Hong Kong	0	0	1	1	0	0	0	0	0	0	1	1
79	Turkmenistan	0	0	1	1	0	0	0	0	0	0	1	1
79	Philippines	0	0	1	1	0	0	0	0	0	0	1	1
Total- (83 entries)		2496	2498	2709	7703	349	347	344	1040	2845	2845	3053	8743

== Sports ==
=== Summer Deaflympics ===
The following sports have been contested in a Summer Deaflympic Games programme:

Sport (Discipline)	Body	24	28	31	35	39	49	53	57	61	65	69	73	77	81	85	89	93	97	01	05	09	13	17	21	25
Current summer sports																										
Aquatics – Swimming		7	10	11	10	11	14	18	14	14	15	17	17	26	26	34	31	34	32	38	38	38	38	40	45	42
Athletics		17	20	23	23	23	24	26	32	32	33	34	34	35	30	32	36	40	40	43	42	43	44	43	45	43
Badminton																5	5	6	6	6	6	6	5	6	6	6
Basketball	DIBF						1	1	1	1	1	1	1	1	2	2	2	2	2	2	2	2	2	2	2	2
Bowling																			10	10	10	10	8	12	7	7
Cycling – Mountain																							2	2	2	4
Cycling – Road		3	3	1	1	1	1	1	3	3	3	3	3	3	4	4	4	4	4	4	4	4	7	8	8	8
Football		1	1	1	1	1	1	1	1	1	1	1	1	1	1	1	1	1	1	2	2	2	2	2	2	2
Golf																								2	2	3
Handball												2	1	1	1	2	1	1	1	2	1	1	1	1	2	1
Judo																						10	17	17	16	16
Karate																						5	15	18	16	14
Orienteering																				6	6	5	8	9	10	9
Shooting		1		1		2	3	3	4	3	3	3	4	4	4	4	8	7	7	6	6	10	11	12	13	13
Table Tennis										5	5	7	7	5	7	7	7	7	7	7	7	7	7	7	7	7
Taekwondo																						8	13	13	11	11
Tennis		2	2	5	5	5	5	5	5	5	5	5	5	5	5	5	5	5	5	5	5	5	5	5	5	5
Volleyball – Beach																					2	2	2	2	2	2
Volleyball – Indoor												2	2	2	2	2	2	2	2	2	2	2	2	2	2	2
Wrestling – Freestyle										8	8	8	10	10	10	10	10	10	8	8	7	7	7	8	8	6
Wrestling – Greco-Roman										8	8	8	10	10	10	10	10	10	8	8	7	7	7	8	8	6
Discontinued summer sports																										
Aquatics – Diving		1	1	1	1	1	1	1	1		1	1														
Aquatics – Water Polo							1		1	1				1	1	1		1	1	1	1	1				
Gymnastics – Artistic			2						2	13	12	12														
Demonstration summer sports																										
Gymnastics – Artistic		•																								
Gymnastics – Rhythmic		•																								
Total		31	38	43	45	47	51	57	69	94	85	105	97	106	110	96	120	126	140	143	147	177	203	219	219	209

=== Winter Deaflympics ===
The following sports have been contested in a Winter Deaflympic Games programme:

Sport (Discipline)	Body	49	53	55	59	63	67	71	75	79	83	87	91	95	99	03	07	15	19	23
Current winter sports
Chess																			4	5
Curling																	2	2	2	3
Futsal																				2
Ice hockey													1	1	1	1	1	1	1	
Skiing – Alpine		3	4	6	10	8	6	6	6	6	8	8	6	8	8	8	10	10	10	10
Skiing – Snowboarding																6	5	10	10	6
Skiing – Nordic – Cross-country		2	3	3	3	5	5	5	6	6	6	6	6	6	8	8	9	8	9	8
Discontinued winter sports
Skiing – Nordic – Nordic combined			1	1																
Skiing – Nordic – Ski jumping			1	1	1															
Speed skating											3	4	5							
Demonstration winter sports
Curling																	•			
Ice hockey									•											
Skiing – Snowboarding															•					
Speed skating									•											
Total		5	9	11	14	13	11	11	12	12	17	18	18	15	17	23	27	31	36	34

== See also ==
- Disabled sports
- Football aux Deaflympics
- Volley-ball aux Deaflympics
- Beach-volley aux Deaflympics
- Basket-ball aux Deaflympics
- Handball aux Deaflympics
