= Czechoslovakia at the Deaflympics =

- IPC code: TCH
- Medals: Gold 3 Silver 7 Bronze 9 Total 19

Summer appearances
- 1928; 1931; 1935; 1939; 1949; 1953; 1957; 1961; 1965; 1969; 1973; 1977; 1981; 1985; 1989; 1993

Winter appearances
- 1949; 1953–1987; 1991

Other related appearances
- Czech Republic (1993–); Slovakia (1993–)

Czechoslovakia first competed at the Deaflympics for the first time in 1928, which was also the 2nd World Games for the Deaf.

Czechoslovakia as the independent nation participated in both Summer Deaflympics and in the Winter Deaflympics from 1928 to 1993. The nation has participated in Winter Deaflympics on two occasions, in the inaugural Winter Deaflympics in 1949 and in 1991.

Czechoslovakia has won a total of 19 medals in the Summer Deaflympics and has never won a medal in the Winter Deaflympics.

After the dissolution of Czechoslovakia in 1992, Czech Republic and Slovakia sent the independent teams in the Deaflympics from 1993. But coincidentally both Czech Republic and Czechoslovakia participated in a same Deaflympic event in 1993.

== Medal tallies ==
=== Summer Deaflympics ===
Event	Gold	Silver	Bronze	Total
1928	0	1	0	1
1931	0	0	1	1
1949	0	0	2	2
1957	2	2	2	6
1961	1	1	3	5
1969	0	2	1	3
1993	0	1	0	1
