= Argentina at the Deaflympics =

- IPC code: ARG
- NPC: Argentine Deaflympic Committee
- Website: http://www.cades.org.ar/ (in Spanish)
- Medals: Gold 1 Silver 4 Bronze 6 Total 11

Summer appearances
- 1965; 1969; 1973; 1977; 1981; 1985; 1989; 1993; 1997; 2001; 2005; 2009; 2013; 2017; 2021

Argentina first completed and won its first medal at the Deaflympics in 1965. Since then, Argentina has been regularly participating at the Deaflympics. Argentina has never competed at the Winter Deaflympics.

== Medal tallies ==
=== Summer Deaflympics ===
Event	Gold	Silver	Bronze	Total
1965	0	1	0	1
1969	1	1	0	2
1973	0	0	0	0
1977	0	0	0	0
1997	0	0	0	0
2001	0	0	0	0
2005	0	0	0	0
2009	0	0	2	2
2013	0	1	1	2
2017	0	0	0	0
2022	0	1	2	3
2025	0	0	1	1

== See also ==
- Argentina at the Paralympics
- Argentina at the Olympics
