= Colombia at the Deaflympics =

- IPC code: COL
- NPC: Colombian Olympic Committee
- Medals: Gold 0 Silver 0 Bronze 1 Total 1

Summer appearances
- 1969; 1973; 1977; 1981; 1985; 1989; 1993; 1997; 2001; 2005; 2009; 2013; 2017; 2021

Colombia competed at the Summer Deaflympics for the first time in 1969 and won its only Deaflympics medal that same year. Colombia has never participated in the Winter Deaflympics.

== Medal tallies ==
=== Summer Deaflympics ===
Year	Gold	Silver	Bronze	Total
1969	0	0	1	1
1985	0	0	0	0
2009	0	0	0	0
2017	0	0	0	0
2021	1	2	1	4

=== Medals at each sports events ===
Event	Year	Medal
Pole vault (Men's)	1969	Bronze

== See also ==
- Colombia at the Paralympics
- Colombia at the Olympics
