= Zimbabwe at the Deaflympics =

- IPC code: ZIM
- NPC: Zimbabwe National Deaf Sports Federation
- Website: {{URL|example.com|optional display text}}
- Medals: Gold 0 Silver 0 Bronze 0 Total 0

Summer appearances
- 1993

Zimbabwe made its first appearance at a Deaflympic event in 1993, which is also the only time that Zimbabwe was eligible to participate at Deaflympics.

Zimbabwe sent a delegation consisting of just 2 Deaf sportspeople in the 1993 Summer Deaflympics.

== See also ==
- Zimbabwe at the Paralympics
- Zimbabwe at the Olympics
