= Brazil at the Deaflympics =

- IPC code: BRA
- NPC: Brazil Deaf Sports Federation
- Website: www.cbds.org.br
- Medals: Gold 2 Silver 2 Bronze 15 Total 19

Summer appearances
- 1993; 1997; 2001; 2005; 2009; 2013; 2017; 2021

Brazil competed at the Deaflympics for the first time in 1993. Since then Brazil has been regularly participating at the Deaflympics. Brazil won its first Deaflympics medal in 2009. Brazil has competed for the first time at Winter Deaflympics on the 2019 Winter Games at the Sondrio Province in Italy.

== Medal tallies ==
=== Summer Deaflympics ===
Event	Gold	Silver	Bronze	Total
1993	0	0	0	0
1997	0	0	0	0
2001	0	0	0	0
2005	0	0	0	0
2009	0	0	1	1
2013	0	1	3	4
2017	1	0	4	5
2021	0	0	6	6
2025	1	0	0	1

=== Winter Deaflympics ===
Event	Gold	Silver	Bronze	Total
2019	0	0	0	0
2024	0	1	1	2

== See also ==
- Brazil at the Paralympics
- Brazil at the Olympics
