= Hong Kong at the Deaflympics =

- IPC code: HKG
- NPC: Hong Kong Sports Association of the Deaf
- Website: www.hksad.org.hk
- Medals: Gold 0 Silver 0 Bronze 2 Total 2

Summer appearances
- 1985; 1989; 1993; 1997; 2001; 2005; 2009; 2013; 2017; 2021

Hong Kong first competed at the Deaflympics for the first time in 1985. Since then Hong Kong has been participating in the Deaflympics. Hong Kong won its first medal during the 2009 Summer Deaflympics, which is also the only medal awarded to them in Deaflympic history.

Hong Kong has yet to participate at the Winter Deaflympics.

== Medal tallies ==
=== Summer Deaflympics ===
Event	Gold	Silver	Bronze	Total
1985	0	0	0	0
1989	0	0	0	0
1993	0	0	0	0
1997	0	0	0	0
2001	0	0	0	0
2009	0	0	1	1
2017	0	0	0	0

== See also ==
- Hong Kong at the Olympics
- Hong Kong at the Paralympics
