= Austria at the Deaflympics =

- IPC code: AUT
- Medals: Gold 19 Silver 30 Bronze 29 Total 78

Summer appearances
- 1931; 1935; 1939; 1949; 1953; 1957; 1961; 1965; 1969; 1973; 1977; 1981; 1985; 1989; 1993; 1997; 2001; 2005; 2009; 2013; 2017; 2021

Winter appearances
- 1953; 1955; 1959; 1963; 1967; 1971–1983; 1987; 1991; 1995; 1999; 2003; 2007; 2015; 2019; 2023

Austria has been participating at the Deaflympics since 1931 and has earned a total of 78 medals.

== Medal tallies ==
=== Summer Deaflympics ===
Event	Gold	Silver	Bronze	Total
1931	0	3	4	7
1935	0	1	1	2
1949	0	3	3	6
1953	1	1	1	3
1981	2	1	0	3
1985	0	1	0	1
2009	0	0	2	2
2013	0	0	2	2
2017	0	0	1	1
2021	0	1	1	2

=== Winter Deaflympics ===
Event	Gold	Silver	Bronze	Total
1953	1	1	1	3
1955	1	1	0	2
1959	1	2	1	4
1963	4	0	0	4
1967	1	1	0	2
1987	2	2	1	5
1991	3	2	2	7
1995	3	4	1	8
1999	0	2	3	5
2003	0	1	0	1
2007	1	1	3	5
2015	0	4	5	9
2019	0	1	4	5

== See also ==
- Austria at the Paralympics
- Austria at the Olympics
