= Czech Republic at the Deaflympics =

- IPC code: CZE
- NPC: Czech Federation Deaf Athletes
- Medals: Gold 31 Silver 14 Bronze 14 Total 59

Summer appearances
- 1993; 1997; 2001; 2005; 2009; 2013; 2017; 2021

Winter appearances
- 1995; 1999; 2003; 2007; 2015; 2019; 2023

Other related appearances
- Czechoslovakia (1928–1993)

Czech Republic which was formerly a part of Czechoslovakia, first competed at the Deaflympics, as an independent nation in 1993. But in 1993, coincidentally Czechoslovakia competed in its last Deaflympic event. Prior to the Dissolution of Czechoslovakia in 1993, Czech athletes went on to compete at the Deaflympics from 1928 to 1993 for Czechoslovakia.

Czech Republic has been regularly participating in both Summer Deaflympics and in Winter Deaflympics since making its debut in 1993.

The nation has won 33 medals in Summer Deaflympics and it has also won 26 medals in the Winter Deaflympics.

== Notable athletes ==
- Petra Kurková, a Czech alpine skier known as one of the greatest deaf female alpine skiers in the world with a medal tally of 12 during her Deaflympic career. She is also known for winning 4 gold medals in a single Winter Deaflympic event in 1999.
- Tereza Kmochová, a Czech alpine skier who is known for winning gold medals in all five events during the 2015 Winter Deaflympics.
- Jakub Nosek, a Czech athlete who has competed at the Deaflympics in 2009, 2013 and 2017. He switched to the sport of Bobsleigh and went on to compete at the 2018 Winter Olympics. He is also the first Czech deaf person to compete at the Olympics.

== Medal tallies ==
=== Summer Deaflympics ===
Event	Gold	Silver	Bronze	Total
1993	3	1	2	6
1997	4	1	1	6
2001	4	3	2	9
2005	3	1	2	6
2009	0	1	0	1
2013	0	2	1	3
2017	1	0	1	2
2021	4	1	3	8

=== Winter Deaflympics ===
Event	Gold	Silver	Bronze	Total
1995	0	0	2	2
1999	4	0	0	4
2003	2	1	1	4
2007	4	3	2	9
2015	6	1	0	7
2019	3	4	1	8
