= Disability in Egypt =

Estimates of the prevalence of disability in Egypt have ranged from 1.8% to 11%. Egypt ratified the United Nations Convention on the Rights of Persons with Disabilities on 10 April 2008. The Egyptian constitution of 2014 guarantees a range of rights for people with disabilities, and Egypt passed legislation entitled the Law on the Rights of Persons with Disabilities in February 2018.

== History ==
Ramesses-Meryamun-Nebweben, son of the Pharaoh Ramasses II, had kyphosis.

== Prevalence ==
Estimates for the prevalence of disability in Egypt have varied widely. The 2006 Egyptian census reported that 1.8% of the population had a disability. However, a study in 2011 by the World Health Organization (WHO), UNICEF, and Egyptian civil society estimated that 8.5 million people, or 11% of Egypt's population, had a disability.

== Legal status ==
Egypt is a party to the United Nations Convention on the Rights of Persons with Disabilities, having signed the treaty on 4 April 2007 and ratified it on 10 April 2008.

In 1975, Egypt passed the Rehabilitation of Disabled Persons Act. Egypt passed legislation entitled the Law on the Rights of Persons with Disabilities in February 2018, the first legislation on disability since 1975. The law covers topic including health, the job market, legal protection, political rights, and rehabilitation.

The Egyptian constitution of 2014 states:

The State shall guarantee the health, economic, social, cultural, entertainment, sporting and educational rights of persons with disabilities strive to provide them with job opportunities, allocate a percentage of job opportunities to them, and adapt public facilities and their surrounding environment to their special needs. The State shall also ensure their exercise of all political rights and integration with other citizens in compliance with the principles of equality, justice and equal opportunities.

== Policy ==
In response to the WHO's Global Disability Action Plan 2014–2021, in 2015 a technical consultation was carried out in Egypt for the development of a National Disability, Health and Rehabilitation Plan.

== Notable Egyptians with disabilities ==
- Ahmed Harara
- Taha Hussein

== See also ==
- Egypt at the Paralympics
- Egypt at the Deaflympics
- Deafness in Egypt
