= Slovenia at the Deaflympics =

- IPC code: SLO
- Website: www.zveza-gns.si
- Medals: Gold 2 Silver 7 Bronze 8 Total 17

Summer appearances
- 1993; 1997; 2001; 2005; 2009; 2013; 2017; 2021

Winter appearances
- 1995; 1999; 2003; 2007; 2015; 2019; 2023

Slovenia first competed at the Deaflympics for the first time in 1993. Since then, Slovenia has been regularly participating in the Summer Deaflympics. Slovenia won its first Deaflympic medal in the 1993 Summer Deaflympics.

Slovenia has been competing at the Winter Deaflympics since 1995 and won its first Winter Deaflympic medal also during the Winter Deaflympic event.

== Medal tallies ==
=== Summer Deaflympics ===
Event	Gold	Silver	Bronze	Total
1993	0	0	1	1
1997	0	0	0	0
2001	0	1	0	1
2005	0	1	0	1
2009	0	0	0	0
2013	0	0	0	0
2017	0	0	0	0

=== Winter Deaflympics ===
Event	Gold	Silver	Bronze	Total
1995	1	2	4	7
1999	1	1	1	3
2003	0	2	1	3
2007	0	0	0	0
2015	0	0	1	1

== See also ==
- Slovenia at the Olympics
- Slovenia at the Paralympics
