= Iceland at the Deaflympics =

- IPC code: ISL
- NPC: Iceland Deaf Sport Organization
- Medals: Gold 0 Silver 1 Bronze 0 Total 1

Summer appearances
- 1993; 1997; 2001; 2005; 2009; 2013; 2017; 2021

Iceland competed at the Deaflympics for the first time in 1993 and also bagged their first medal at the Deaflympics, which is also Iceland's only medal in Deaflympics history. Iceland also competed in the 1997, 2005 and 2013 Deaflympic events.

Iceland is yet to compete at the Winter Deaflympics.

== Medal tallies ==
=== Summer Deaflympics ===
Event	Gold	Silver	Bronze	Total
1993	0	1	0	0
1997	0	0	0	0
2001	0	0	0	0
2013	0	0	0	0

== See also ==
- Iceland at the Olympics
- Iceland at the Paralympics
