= Estonia at the Deaflympics =

- IPC code: EST
- NPC: Estonian Deaf Sport Union
- Website: www.kurtidespordiliit.ee (in Estonian)
- Medals: Gold 11 Silver 8 Bronze 13 Total 32

Summer appearances
- 1993; 1997; 2001; 2005; 2009; 2013; 2017; 2021

Other related appearances
- Soviet Union (1957–1991)

Estonia has been participating at the Deaflympics since 1993 and has earned a total of 32 medals.

== Medal tallies ==
=== Summer Deaflympics ===
Event	Gold	Silver	Bronze	Total
1993	2	1	2	5
1997	1	3	1	5
2001	0	1	4	5
2005	3	0	2	5
2009	4	2	2	8
2013	1	1	1	3
2017	0	0	1	1
2021	1	0	2	3

== See also ==
- Estonia at the Paralympics
- Estonia at the Olympics
