= Moldova at the Deaflympics =

- IPC code: MDA
- NPC: Paralympic Committee of Moldova
- Medals: Gold 0 Silver 1 Bronze 1 Total 2

Summer appearances
- 1993; 1997; 2001; 2005; 2009; 2013; 2017; 2021

Other related appearances
- Soviet Union (1957–1991)

Moldova first competed at the Summer Deaflympics in 1993. The country has competed at five Summer Deaflympics and has not yet competed at the Winter Deaflympics.

The country won one silver medal in cycling at the 1997 Summer Deaflympics and one bronze medal in wrestling at the 2013 Summer Deaflympics.

== Medal tallies ==
=== Summer Deaflympics ===
Year	Gold	Silver	Bronze	Total
1993	0	0	0	0
1997	0	1	0	1
2001	0	0	0	0
2013	0	0	1	1
2017	0	0	0	0
