= Lithuania at the Deaflympics =

- IPC code: LTU
- Website: www.lksf.ten.lt
- Medals: Gold 13 Silver 14 Bronze 22 Total 49

Summer appearances
- 1993; 1997; 2001; 2005; 2009; 2013; 2017; 2021

Winter appearances
- 1995; 1999; 2003; 2007; 2015–2019; 2023

Other related appearances
- Soviet Union (1957–1991)

Lithuania has been participating at the Deaflympics since 1993 and has earned a total of 49 medals.

== Medal tallies ==
=== Summer Deaflympics ===
Event	Gold	Silver	Bronze	Total
1993	0	1	0	1
1997	1	1	2	4
2001	2	0	3	5
2005	3	1	4	8
2009	2	4	7	13
2013	4	5	4	13
2017	1	1	2	4
2021	2	5	3	10

=== Winter Deaflympics ===
Event	Gold	Silver	Bronze	Total
1995	0	0	0	0
1999	0	1	0	1
2003	0	0	0	0
2007	0	0	0	0

== See also ==
- Lithuania at the Paralympics
- Lithuania at the Olympics
