= Cyprus at the Deaflympics =

- IPC code: CYP
- NPC: Cyprus Deaf Athletic Federation
- Medals: Gold 0 Silver 0 Bronze 1 Total 1

Summer appearances
- 1997; 2001; 2005; 2009; 2013; 2017; 2021

Cyprus first competed at the Deaflympics way back in 1997. Since then Cyprus has been participating at the Deaflympics regularly. Cyprus won its first Deaflympic medal for bowling at the 2013 Summer Deaflympics. Cyprus has never participated in the Winter Deaflympics.

== Medal tallies ==
=== Summer Deaflympics ===
| Year | Gold | Silver | Bronze | Total |
| 1997 | 0 | 0 | 0 | 0 |
| 2001 | 0 | 0 | 0 | 0 |
| 2005 | 0 | 0 | 0 | 0 |
| 2009 | 0 | 0 | 0 | 0 |
| 2013 | 0 | 0 | 1 | 1 |
| 2017 | 0 | 0 | 0 | 0 |

=== Medals at each sports events ===
| Event | Year | Medal |
|---|---|---|
| Bowling | 2013 | Bronze |

== See also ==
- Cyprus at the Paralympics
- Cyprus at the Olympics
