= Saudi Arabia at the Deaflympics =

- IPC code: KSA
- NPC: Saudi Deaf Sport Federation
- Medals: Gold 0 Silver 0 Bronze 3 Total 3

Summer appearances
- 2001; 2005; 2009; 2013; 2017; 2021

Saudi Arabia first competed at the Deaflympics for the first time in 2001. Saudi Arabia won its first Deaflympic medal (bronze) in the 2009 Summer Deaflympics for bowling, which is also the only medal won by them in Deaflympic history.

Saudi Arabia has yet to compete at the Winter Deaflympics.

== Medal tallies ==
=== Summer Deaflympics ===
Year	Gold	Silver	Bronze	Total
2001	0	0	0	0
2005	0	0	0	0
2009	0	0	1	1
2013	0	0	0	0
2017	0	0	0	0
2021	0	0	2	2

== See also ==
- Saudi Arabia at the Olympics
- Saudi Arabia at the Paralympics
