= Armenia at the Deaflympics =

- IPC code: ARM
- NPC: Armenian Deaf Sports Committee
- Medals: Gold 0 Silver 0 Bronze 1 Total 1

Summer appearances
- 2001; 2005; 2009; 2013; 2017; 2021

Other related appearances
- Soviet Union (1957–1991)

Armenia has been competing at the Deaflympics since its debut at the Deaflympics in 2001. Armenia won their first Deaflympic medal in 2013, for the wrestling event; this is also the only medal received by Armenia at the Deaflympics to date.

== Involvement ==
Armenia made its debut at a Winter Deaflympics event in 2015, though has been involved in the Deaflympics games since 2001.

== Medal tallies ==
=== Summer Deaflympics ===
Event	Gold	Silver	Bronze	Total
2001	0	0	0	0
2005	0	0	0	0
2009	0	0	0	0
2013	0	0	1	1
2017	0	0	4	4
2021	0	0	5	5

=== Medals at each sports events ===
Event	Year	Medal
Wrestling	2013	Bronze

== See also ==
- Armenia at the Olympics
- Armenia at the Paralympics
- Sport in Armenia
