= Turkmenistan at the Deaflympics =

- IPC code: TKM
- NPC: National Paralympic Committee of Turkmenistan
- Medals: Gold 0 Silver 0 Bronze 1 Total 1

Summer appearances
- 2001; 2005; 2009; 2013; 2017; 2021

Other related appearances
- Soviet Union (1957–1991)

Turkmenistan first competed at the Summer Deaflympics in 2001. The country also competed at the Summer Deaflympics in 2005, 2013 and 2017.

The country won its first and thus far only medal in 2013: Hojymyrat Azapov won the bronze medal in wrestling at the men's 66 kg event. In 2017, he competed both in freestyle and in Greco-Roman wrestling and he did not win a medal this time.

The country has not yet competed at the Winter Deaflympics.

== Medal tallies ==
=== Summer Deaflympics ===
Year	Gold	Silver	Bronze	Total
2001	0	0	0	0
2005	0	0	0	0
2013	0	0	1	1
2017	0	0	0	0
