= Thailand at the Deaflympics =

- IPC code: THA
- NPC: The Deaf Sports Association of Thailand
- Website: thailanddeaf.com
- Medals: Gold 1 Silver 1 Bronze 0 Total 2

Summer appearances
- 2005; 2009; 2013; 2017; 2021

Thailand has been participating at the Deaflympics since 2005. Thailand has won 2 medals.

Thailand has competed at the Summer Deaflympics since 2005.

== Medal tallies ==
=== Summer Deaflympics ===
Event	Gold	Silver	Bronze	Total
2005	0	1	0	1
2009	0	0	0	0
2013	0	0	0	0
2017	1	0	0	1

== Medals ==
Source:

== See also ==
- Thailand at the Olympics
- Thailand at the Paralympics
