= Kenya at the Deaflympics =

- IPC code: KEN
- NPC: Kenyan Sports Federation of the Deaf
- Website: www.facebook.com/pages/category/Community/Kenya-Sports-Federation-of-the-Deaf-1546341075583918/
- Medals: Gold 14 Silver 13 Bronze 15 Total 42

Summer appearances
- 1997; 2001; 2005; 2009; 2013; 2017; 2021

Kenya has been participating at the Deaflympics since 1997.

== Medal tallies ==
=== Summer Deaflympics ===
Event	Gold	Silver	Bronze	Total
1997	0	0	0	0
2001	0	1	0	1
2005	1	1	3	5
2009	4	2	2	8
2013	3	2	5	10
2017	4	4	5	13
2021	5	7	12	24

== See also ==
- Kenya at the Olympics
- Kenya at the Paralympics
