= Philippines at the Deaflympics =

- IPC code: PHI
- National federation: Phil Sports Federation of the Deaf
- Medals: Gold 0 Silver 0 Bronze 0 Total 0

Summer appearances
- 2009; 2013; 2017; 2021

The Philippines has been competing at the Deaflympics since the 2009 edition. The country is represented by the Phil Sports Federation of the Deaf (PSFD).

Athletes representing the country in the Deaflympics has never won a medal. The Philippines has yet to participate in the Winter Deaflympic Games.

== Summary ==
=== All-time medal tally ===
Ranking is based on total gold medals earned.

Games	Athletes	Gold	Silver	Bronze	Total	Rank
(Chinese Taipei) 2009 Taipei	6	0	0	0	-	-
(Bulgaria) 2013 Sofia	2	0	0	0	-	-
(Turkey) 2017 Samsun	Did not participate					
(Brazil) 2021 Caxias do Sul	1	0	0	0	-	-
(Japan) 2025 Tokyo	?	0	0	1	1	
Total		0	0	1	1	-

== Participation history ==
=== 2009 Summer Deaflympics ===
The PSFD decided to initially focused on bowling and sent a delegation of six bowlers at the 2009 Summer Deaflympics. This is due to the president of the organization at that time, Maria Lovella Catalan, for being known as a player in bowling both in deaf and hearing variants of the sport. Catalan herself competed.

Bowling

- Maria Lovella Catalan
- Jorrelle Faytaren
- Ariscel Lobo
- Anthony Pacis
- Christopher Uy
- Maria Cecilia Villacin

=== 2013 Summer Deaflympics ===
Two of the six debutants in the 2009 Deaflympics; Catalan and Lobo, returned to compete in the 2013 edition.

Bowling

- Maria Lovella Catalan
- Ariscel Lobo

=== 2017 Summer Deaflympics ===
The Philippines sent a lone athlete in the 2017 edition. The country competed in table tennis for the first time in the Deaflympics.

Table tennis

- Abrianne Nuevo

== See also ==
- Philippines at the Paralympics
- Philippines at the Olympics
