= Ecuador at the Deaflympics =

- IPC code: ECU
- Medals: Gold 0 Silver 0 Bronze 0 Total 0

Summer appearances
- 2013; 2017; 2021

Ecuador first competed at the Deaflympics for the first time in 2013 and also went on to participate at the 2017 Summer Deaflympics, winning a silver medal in 2017.

Ecuador yet to participate at the Winter Deaflympics.

== Medal tallies ==
=== Summer Deaflympics ===
Year	Gold	Silver	Bronze	Total
2013	0	0	0	0
2017	0	1	0	1
2021	1	0	0	1
