= Portugal at the Deaflympics =

- IPC code: POR
- NPC: Portuguese Deaflympic Committee
- Website: www.lpdsurdos.org.pt(in Portuguese)
- Medals: Gold 7 Silver 3 Bronze 6 Total 16

Summer appearances
- 1993; 1997; 2001; 2005; 2009; 2013; 2017; 2021

Portugal competed at the Deaflympics for the first in 1993. Since then Portugal has been regularly participating at the Deaflympics. Portugal won its first Deaflympics medal also in 1993. Portugal has never participated in the Winter Deaflympics.

== Medal tallies ==
=== Summer Deaflympics ===
Event	Gold	Silver	Bronze	Total
1993	0	2	0	2
1997	0	0	0	0
2001	1	0	0	1
2005	1	0	0	1
2009	2	0	2	4
2013	1	1	1	3
2017	0	0	1	1
2021	2	0	2	4

== See also ==
- Portugal at the Paralympics
- Portugal at the Olympics
