= Singapore at the Deaflympics =

- IPC code: SIN
- NPC: Deaf Sports Association (Singapore)
- Website: dsa.org.sg
- Medals: Gold 0 Silver 0 Bronze 0 Total 0

Summer appearances
- 2001; 2005; 2009; 2013; 2017; 2021

Singapore has been participating at the Deaflympics since 2001.

Singapore has competed at the Summer Deaflympics on three occasions in 2001, 2005, 2009 and 2013.

== Medal tallies ==
=== Summer Deaflympics ===
Event	Gold	Silver	Bronze	Total
2001	0	0	0	0
2005	0	0	0	0
2009	0	0	0	0
2013	0	0	0	0
2017	0	0	0	0
2021	0	0	0	0
2025	0	0	0	0

== See also ==
- Singapore at the Olympics
- Singapore at the Paralympics
