= Venezuela at the Deaflympics =

- IPC code: VEN
- NPC: Federacion Venezolana Polideportiva de Sordos
- Website: http://www.feposor.com.ve
- Medals: Gold 14 Silver 13 Bronze 27 Total 54

Summer appearances
- 1969; 1973; 1977; 1981; 1985; 1989; 1993; 1997; 2001; 2005; 2009; 2013; 2017; 2021

Venezuela has been participating at the Deaflympics since 1969 and has earned a total of 54 medals.

Venezuela yet to compete at the Winter Deaflympic Games.

== Medal tallies ==
Event	Gold	Silver	Bronze	Total
2001	0	1	0	1
2005	1	0	0	1
2009	3	1	2	6
2013	3	3	5	11
2017	5	5	8	18
2022	2	3	12	17
