= Egypt at the Deaflympics =

- IPC code: EGY
- NPC: Egyptian Deaf Sports Committee
- Medals: Gold 0 Silver 0 Bronze 1 Total 1

Summer appearances
- 2013; 2017; 2021

Egypt made its Deaflympics debut in the 2013 Summer Deaflympics. Egypt claimed their first Deaflympic medal when they clinched the bronze medal for football in the 2017 Summer Deaflympics Egypt has never participated in the Winter Deaflympics.

== Medal tallies ==
=== Summer Deaflympics ===
Year	Gold	Silver	Bronze	Total	
2013	28 sport	0	0	0	0
2017	22 sport	0	1	1	

=== Medals at each sports events ===
Event	Year	Medal
Football	2017	Bronze

== See also ==
- Egypt at the Paralympics
- Egypt at the Olympics
