= Kyrgyzstan at the Deaflympics =

- IPC code: KGZ
- NPC: Organization of Sports Movement of Deaf Persons
- Medals: Gold 0 Silver 0 Bronze 3 Total 3

Summer appearances
- 2009; 2013; 2017; 2021

Other related appearances
- Soviet Union (1957–1991)

Kyrgyzstan competed at the Deaflympics for the first time in 2009. Kyrgyzstan also won a bronze medal for wrestling in their first Deaflympic event. Currently Kyrgyzstan has won a total of 3 medals in Deaflympics.

Kyrgyzstan has yet to participate at the Winter Deaflympics.

== Medal tallies ==
=== Summer Deaflympics ===
Year	Gold	Silver	Bronze	Total
2009	0	0	1	1
2013	0	0	0	0
2017	0	0	2	2

== See also ==
- Kyrgyzstan at the Olympics
- Kyrgyzstan at the Paralympics
