= 1928 Summer Deaflympics =

2nd Summer Deaflympics

2nd Summer Deaflympics
- Host city: Amsterdam, Netherlands
- Nations: 10 countries
- Athletes: 212 athletes
- Events: 38 (6 disciplines)
- Opening: 18 August 1928
- Closing: 26 August 1928
- Opened by: Wilhelmina of the Netherlands

Summer

The 1928 Summer Deaflympics (Dutch: Zomerdeaflympische Zomerspelen 1928), officially known as the 2nd International Silent Games (Dutch: 2e Internationale Stille Spelen), is an international multi-sport event that was celebrated from 18 to 26 August 1928 in Amsterdam, Netherlands

== Participating Countries ==
The countries who participated in the 1928 Deaflympics were:

- Austria
- Belgium
- Czechoslovakia
- France
- Germany
- (United Kingdom) Great Britain
- Hungary
- (Kingdom of Italy) Italy
- Netherlands
- Switzerland

== Sports ==
The following events were included in the 1928 Deaflympics:

- Football

== Medal tables ==
Event	Gold	Silver	Bronze
Men's Football	Great Britain (GBR); Frederick John Archbold, Alexander David Bremner, Robert Brewis, Reginald Gill, William Coxon Hoggins, Charles Hudson; R.Hurst, James Johnstone, John Robert Longstaff, Herbert George Mitchell, Terrence Henry Roberts, George Scott, Henry Simm, Harry Augustus Wakeling, Lenonard Whitehouse, James Young	Czechoslovakia (TCH); Vaclav Bahensky, Karel Fara, Josef Janovsky, Jaroslav Kupsa, Leo Patejdl, Eduard Pellant, Karel Pucherna, Jaroslave Slansky, Karel Svetlik, Vaclav Tancibudek, Jiri Tichy, Tronicek, Rostislav Vanek, Frantisek Vlach, Josef Vokurka	Netherlands (NED); Hendrik Berkhout, Stefhanus Marinus Collewijn, Herman Benjamin Dasberg, Frans De Buyzer, Aart De Jong, Leenert Gabriel Dronkers, Goudswaard Johannus, Pieter Hommel, Jon Krist, Jan Langereis, Jacob Cornelis Quist, Marinus Stok, Dirk Van Der Lugt, Mozes Wertheim

== See also ==
- Deaflympics

Preceded by 1924 I Paris	1928; II; Amsterdam	Succeeded by 1931 III; Nürnberg
