= 1931 Summer Deaflympics =

3rd Summer Deaflympics

3rd Summer Deaflympics
- Host city: Nürnberg, Germany
- Nations: 14 countries
- Athletes: 316 athletes
- Events: 43 (7 disciplines)
- Opening: 19 August 1931
- Closing: 23 August 1931
- Opened by: Paul von Hindenburg

Summer

The 1931 Summer Deaflympics (German: Sommer-Deaflympics 1931) officially known as the 3rd Summer Deaflympics (German: 3. Sommer Deaflympics) (3rd International Silent Games) (German: (3. Internationale Stille Spiele)) was an international multi-sport event that was held from 19 August 1931 to 23 August 1931. It was hosted by Nürnberg, Germany.

The 3rd Summer Deaflympics Games were originally scheduled to be held from 31 August to 11 September 1932 in Los Angeles, but was decided to host it in 1931 due to the schedule of 1932 Summer Olympics.

== Participating countries ==
The countries who participated in the games were:

- Austria
- Belgium
- Czechoslovakia
- Denmark
- Finland
- France
- Germany
- (United Kingdom) Great Britain
- Hungary
- (Kingdom of Italy) Italy
- Netherlands
- Norway
- Sweden
- Switzerland

Poland were not allowed to participate at the Games due to Germany's conflict with Poland during the Nazi rule at that time as the Games held in Germany.

== Sports ==
The following events were included in the 1931 Deaflympics:

=== Individual sports ===
- Athletics
- Road cycling
- Diving
- Shooting
- Swimming
- Tennis

=== Team sports ===
- Football

== Medal table ==
* Host nation (Germany)

1931 Summer Deaflympics medal table
Rank	NOC	Gold	Silver	Bronze	Total
1	Germany (GER)*	14	12	7	33
2	Denmark (DEN)	10	2	4	16
3	France (FRA)	5	8	7	20
4	Sweden (SWE)	4	3	0	7
5	Belgium (BEL)	3	1	3	7
6	Finland (FIN)	2	5	2	9
7	Hungary (HUN)	2	1	0	3
8	Norway (NOR)	1	1	2	4
9	Italy (ITA)	1	1	0	2
10	Austria (AUT)	0	4	4	8
11	Great Britain (GBR)	0	2	7	9
12	Czechoslovakia (TCH)	0	2	1	3
13	Netherlands (NED)	0	0	0	0
13	Switzerland (SUI)	0	0	0	0
Totals (14 entries)		42	42	37	121

== Results ==
=== Athletics ===
Event	Gold	Silver	Bronze
Men 100m	Louis Fruerlund; Denmark	Paul Reinmund; France	Cyril Reynolds; Great Britain
Women 100m	Aina Kjellin; Sweden	Lotze Grete; Germany	Elisabeth Salzmann; Germany
Men 200m	Louis Fruerlund; Denmark	Paul Reinmund; France	Cyril Reynolds; Great Britain
Men 400m	Louis Fruerlund; Denmark	Gerhard Dammann; Germany	Matti Kattainen; Finland
Men 800m	Tage Christensen; Denmark	Paavo Valtari; Finland	Robert Bouscarat; France
Men 1500m	Tage Christensen; Denmark	Robert Bouscarat; France	Karl Rohrig; Germany
Men 5000m	Niels Jeul Knudsen; Denmark	Matti Mölsä; Finland	Toivo Ala-Kilpoinen; Finland
Men 10000m	Matti Mölsä; Finland	Östen Ericksson; Sweden	Niels Jeul Knudsen; Denmark
Men 110m Hurdles	Fritz Kraemer; Germany	Rudolf Taubert; Germany	Adrien Ruelland; France
Men 400m Hurdles	Fritz Kraemer; Germany	Adrien Ruelland; France	Charles Hudson; Great Britain
Men 4 × 100 m Relay	Denmark (DEN); Tage Christensen; Louis Fruerlund; Gunnar Madsen; Hans Nissen (Note: Denmark was the only country who participated in this event)		
Women 4x100 Relay	Germany (GER); Minna Jung; Grete Lobinger; Grete Lotze; Elisabeth Salzmann	Austria (AUT); Frida Horwath; Rosa Jaffe; Maria Pitamitz; Elisabeth Schlemmer (Note: Only Germany and Austria participated in this event.)	
Men 4 × 400 m Relay	Denmark (DEN); Tage Christensen; Louis Fruerlund; Gunnar Madsen; Hans Erik Tvilum	Finland (FIN); Toivo Ala-Kilpoinen; Matti Kattainen; Valentin Kaurela; Herman Wikberg	France (FRA); Raymond Pagny; Charles Rainerie; Adrien Ruelland; Marcel Vincent
Men Olympic Relay	Denmark (DEN); Tage Christensen; Louis Fruerlund; Gunnar Madsen; Hans Nissen	France (FRA); Robert Bouscarat; Leon Pertsowsky; Paul Reinmund; Marcel Vincent	Finland (FIN); Toivo Ala-Kilpoinen; Matti Kattainen; Valentin Kaurela; Herman Wikberg
Men High Jump	Hans Nissen; Denmark	Valentin Kaurela; Finland	Hans Erik Tvilum; Denmark
Women High Jump	Grete Lotze; Germany	Mina Jung; Germany	Frida Horwath; Austria
Men Pole Vault	Arvid Rǿstad; Norway	Gunnar Madsen; Denmark	Hans Nissen; Denmark
Men Long Jump	Paul Reinmund; France	Hans Nissen; Denmark	Arvid Rǿstad; Norway
Women Long Jump	Rosalie Plomann; Germany	Mina Jung; Germany	Mathilde Horky; Austria
Men Shot Put	Valentin Kaurela; Finland	Nils Rahmn; Sweden	Louis Stephan; France
Women Shot Put	Aina Kjellin; Sweden	Elisabeth Schlemmer; Austria	Ida Stadler; Austria
Men Discus Throw	Nils Rahmn; Sweden	Wilhelm Westling; Sweden	Hans Nissen; Denmark
Men Javelin Throw	Wilhelm Westling; Sweden	Herman Wikberg; Finland	Carl O. Hansen; Denmark

=== Cycling ===
Event	Gold	Silver	Bronze
Road Men Individual Road Race	Cermesoni (Note: The first name of this participant is not recorded.); Italy	Mongiam (Note: The first name of this participant is not recorded.); Italy	Paul Boussin; France

=== Diving ===
Event	Gold	Silver	Bronze
Men Diving 3m springboard	Otto Laubner; Germany	Kurt Sachsenweger; Germany	Karl Kaudel; Austria

=== Football ===
Event	Gold	Silver	Bronze
Men Football	Germany (GER); Andreas Beck; Johann Brinkmann; Hans Eckert; Otto Huppach; Wilhelm Kohler; Fritz Lochner; Hermann Mittelmann; Hans Philberth; Paul Schneider; Konrad Sonntag; Hans Stachl; Michael Strigl; Fritz Truger; Otto Wach	Austria (AUT); Rudolf Bauer; Berthold Brecher; Franz Figl; Rudolf First; Alois Gally; Alfred Kafka; Rudolf Kafka; Elias Kestenbaum; Samuel Kestenbaum; Leopold Komenda; Moritz Lindenheim; Johann Maibock; Eduard Marik; Otto Merhaut; Ignatz Nidetzky; Paul Pauser; Otto Weiss; Fritz Wurmhoringer; Hans Zinnauer	Czechoslovakia (TCH); Richard Crhan; Bohumil (Bohuslav) Duhek; Frantisek Eichler; Ladislav Gmunt; Frantisek Hornof; Josef Janovsky; Prokop Lukes; Stanislav Mandelicek; Leo Patejdl; Eduard Pellant; Karel Pucherna; Jaroslav (Jaroslas) Slansky; Jan Sorjka; Karel Sommer; Karel Svetlik; Vaclav Tancibudek; Jiri (Georg) Tichy; Rudolf Umlauf; Rostislav Vanek; Josef Vokurka

=== Shooting ===
Event	Gold	Silver	Bronze
Men shooting small bore rifle 3 positions	Fernand Chante; France	Hans Zerbst; Germany	Oscar Spiess; Germany

=== Swimming ===
Event	Gold	Silver	Bronze
Men 100m Freestyle	Emile Talmone; France	Herbert Emil Reuschke; Germany	Kurt Weiss; Germany
Women 100m Freestyle	Vilma-Rozsa Wilhelmine Krassner; Hungary	Gizella Unghvary; Hungary	Hannel Rolle; Germany
Men 400m Freestyle	Kurt Weiss; Germany	Charles Grant; Great Britain	Reidar Munthe Iversen; Norway
Men 1500m Freestyle	Kurt Weiss; Germany	Reidar Munthe Iversen; Norway	Charles Grant; Great Britain
Men 100m Backstroke	Wilhelm Bruno Gustav Gehring; Germany	Rudolf Tauberg; Germany	Emile Talmone; France
Women 100m Backstroke	Gizella Unghvary; Hungary	Vilma-Rozsa Wilhelmine Krassner; Hungary	Hannel Rolle; Germany
Men 100m Breastsroke	Wilhelm Seitz; Germany	Erich Hermann Karl Salzmann; Germany	John Stuart Burge; Great Britain
Men 200m Breaststroke	Erich Hermann Karl Salzmann; Germany	Wilhelm Seitz; Germany	John Stuart Burge; Great Britain
Women 200m Breaststroke	Gizella Unghvary; Hungary	Anna Salzmann; Germany	Hannel Rolle; Germany
Men 4 × 100 m freestyle relay	Germany (GER); Wilhelm Bruno Gustav Gehring; Kurt Güldner; Herbert Emil Reuschke; Kurt Weiss (Note: Germany was the only country who participated in this event)		
Men 3x100m freestyle medley	Germany (GER); Wilhelm Bruno Gustav Gehring; Herbert Emil Reuschke; Wilhelm Seitz (Note: Germany was the only country who participated in this event)		

=== Tennis ===
Event	Gold	Silver	Bronze
Men Tennis Singles	Charles Boisselot; France	Pierre Rincheval; France	Antoine Dresse; Belgium
Women Tennis Singles	Antonine Maere; Belgium	Germaine Hamy-Maere; Belgium	Helene Haardt; France
Men Tennis Doubles	France (FRA); Andre Petry; Pierre Rincheval	Great Britain (GBR); Owen Bevan Maxwell; Arthur Norman Pett	Belgium (BEL); Antoine Dresse; Raymond van Hoecke
Women Tennis Doubles	Belgium (BEL); Germaine Hamy-Maere; Antonine Maere	France (FRA); Helene Haardt; Simone Kahn	Great Britain (GBR); Lenore Dawson; Elsie May Mountain
Mixed Tennis Doubles	Belgium (BEL); Antoine Dresse; Antonine Maere	France (FRA); Charles Boisselot; Helene Haardt	Belgium (BEL); Germaine Hamy-Maere; Raymond van Hoecke

== Notes ==
Preceded by 1928 II; Amsterdam, Netherlands	1931 Summer Deaflympics; III; Nürnberg, Germany	Succeeded by 1935 XI; London, England
