= 1924 Summer Deaflympics =

1st Summer Deaflympics

1st Summer Deaflympics
- Host city: Paris, France
- Nations: 9 countries
- Athletes: 148 athletes
- Events: 31 (7 disciplines)
- Opening: 10 August 1924
- Closing: 17 August 1924
- Opened by: Gaston Doumergue
- Main venue: Stade Olympique Yves-du-Manoir

Summer

The First International Silent Games (French: Premiers Jeux Silencieux Internationaux), or First International Games for the Deaf (French: Premiers Jeux Internationaux pour les Sourds), now referred to retroactively as the 1924 Summer Deaflympics (French: Sourdlympiques d'été de 1924), were the inaugural edition of the Deaflympics. The Games were held in Paris, France, from 10 to 17 August 1924, as an equivalent to the Olympic Games for deaf athletes. They were organised on the initiative of deaf Frenchman Eugène Rubens-Alcais, who, just after the Games, co-founded the Comité International des Sports des Sourds with other "deaf sporting leaders". (Rubens-Alcais had previously founded France's first sports federation for the deaf and mute, in 1918.) The 1924 Games were "the first games ever" for athletes with a disability, preceding the World Wheelchair and Amputee Games in 1948, which became the Paralympic Games in 1960 but which did not include events for deaf athletes.

These First Silent Games were held just two weeks after the end of the 1924 Summer Olympics, also in Paris. The Games for the deaf were "modelled on the Olympic Games".

Nine countries, "including six official national federations already in existence", sent 148 athletes to compete, in seven sports: athletics, road cycling, diving, football, shooting, swimming, and tennis. Demonstration events were also held in gymnastics. Not counting gymnastics, a total of 31 events were held. Specifically, France, Belgium, Great Britain, Latvia, the Netherlands, and Poland "already had a sports federation" for the deaf, while Italy, Romania and Hungary each sent one athlete despite having no such federation yet.

There were 147 male athletes, and only one female athlete: Hendrika Nicoline Van der Heyden, of the Netherlands. She "competed" alone in the 100m backstroke event for women in swimming, completing it in 2:03.6, which set a world record. It was the only walkover, as there were at least two competitors in each of the men's thirty events (three competitors in all but one).

The host country, France, dominated, winning sixteen of the seventeen events in athletics; the sole exception was the javelin throw, where Belgian Nicolas François came first ahead of Frenchman Raymond Code. Frenchman Émile Van den Torren won the most events overall, coming first in the 1,500 metres, 5,000 metres and 10,000 metres in athletics. France also swept up all three gold medals in cycling, the only gold medal in shooting, one of the two gold in tennis, and won the football competition. By contrast, the six swimming events were much more open; France won none, and the six gold medals were shared between the Netherlands, Italy and the United Kingdom (competing as "Great Britain"). The British also won one of the tennis events: the men's doubles.

The Games were deemed a success, and a second edition was held four years later in Amsterdam, with 212 athletes from ten nations – including, this time, fourteen women. (Amsterdam also held the Olympic Games that year.) With the 1924 Games being the first in a regular series, the International Games for the Deaf were established as "the second oldest international multi-sport event in the world", after the Olympic Games.

== Sports ==
=== Athletics ===
Seventeen track and field events were held, exclusively for men in the absence of any female competitors. Sixteen gold medals were won by France, and one by Belgium. World records were set in every event. Athletes from seven countries (France, Belgium, Great Britain, Netherlands, Poland, Latvia, Romania) took part.

=== Cycling ===
Three events were held, all in road cycling: the men's 1,000 metre sprint (won by Frenchman Paul Lambert in 15.2; the men's individual time trial (won by Frenchman Théodore Saliou in 34:07.0); and the men's individual road race (won by Frenchman Paul Boussin in 5:07:44). No records were set. A total of six athletes took part: four from France and two from Belgium.

=== Diving ===
A single event was held in diving: the men's 3m springboard. Two British and one Dutch divers competed. British diver G.E. Rimmer is recorded as the winner, with no specifics as to his performance.

=== Football ===
The competition was won by the host country, with Great Britain finishing second and Belgium third. (No other details are recorded, other than the names of the players.)

=== Shooting ===
The single event was the men's army rifle, 200 metres. There were seven participants: four from France and three from Great Britain. Frenchman René Bapt won with 23 points, a comfortable lead.

=== Swimming ===
There were five events for men, and one for women. Italian Roberto de Marchi won the men's 100m freestyle with a world record time of 1:31.4, and the 1,500m freestyle in 33:36.4, also a world record. Dutchwoman Hendrika Nicoline Van der Heyden, the lone competitor in the women's 100m backstroke, set a world record time of 2:03.6. The men's equivalent event was won by her compatriot W.J. Brinkman, whose time is not recorded. Brinkman also won the 200m breaststroke, in 4:29.6, which was not a world record. The British team won the men's 4 × 100 m freestyle relay with a world record time of 7:45.8. Swimmers competed from four countries: Italy, the Netherlands, Great Britain, and France.

=== Tennis ===
Pierre Rincheval of France won the men's singles, while the doubles went to Owen Bevan Maxwell and H. Hyslop of Great Britain. Great Britain, France and Belgium were the three nations competing.

== Participating countries ==
The number in parentheses indicates the number of athletes. Hungary is listed as having sent a single athlete, Alexander de Szalay, but he does not appear listed in any of the events.

Only European countries took part. This remained the case until the fourth Games, in 1935 in London, when the United States became the first non-European country to compete.

- Belgium (26)
- France (66)
- (United Kingdom) Great Britain (34)
- Hungary (1)
- Italy (1)
- Latvia (1)
- Netherlands (13)
- Poland (5)
- Romania (1)

== Medal tally ==
France dominated the Games on home ground. Italy's lone representative, swimmer Roberto de Marchi, won gold in both the events he took part in, placing his country fourth on the medal table. Belgium's gold medallist was Nicolas François in the javelin, who just prevented the host country from making a clean sweep of all seventeen gold medals in track and field. Poland's sole medal, a silver, was won in the 4 × 400 m relay in athletics.

There are more bronze medals than silver overall because, although no bronze medal was awarded in the pole vault, two bronze were awarded in each of the two tennis events.

* Host nation (France)

Rank	Nation	Gold	Silver	Bronze	Total
1	France (FRA)*	22	16	10	48
2	Great Britain (GBR)	3	3	5	11
3	Netherlands (NED)	2	5	2	9
4	Italy (ITA)	2	0	0	2
5	Belgium (BEL)	1	4	14	19
6	Poland (POL)	0	1	0	1
7	Hungary (HUN)	0	0	0	0
7	Latvia (LAT)	0	0	0	0
7	Romania (ROM)	0	0	0	0
Totals (9 entries)		30	29	31	90

== See also ==
Preceded by none	1924; I Paris	Succeeded by 1928 II; Amsterdam
