= 1949 Winter Deaflympics =

International sports event for deaf people

1st Winter Deaflympics
- Host city: Seefeld,Austria
- Nations: 5 countries
- Athletes: 33 athletes
- Events: 5 (2 disciplines)
- Opening: 26 January 1949
- Closing: 30 January 1949

Summer

Winter

The 1949 Winter Deaflympics (German: Winter-Deaflympics 1949) officially known as the I International Winter Games for the Deaf (German: I Internationale Winterspiele für Gehörlose) is an international multi-sport event that was held from 26 January 1949 to 30 January 1949. This event was hosted by Austria.

The 1st Winter Deaflympics Games were originally scheduled to be held from 29 February to 6 March 1948 in St. Moritz, but was decided to host it in 1949 due to the schedule of 1948 Winter Olympics.

== History ==
This event was introduced as a result of the success of the Summer Deaflympics which was introduced in 1924.

The event held just after the end of World War II and the Games held coinciding the 1949 Summer Deaflympics.

Only 5 Nations participated at the inaugural Winter Deaflympics including the host nation Austria. The other nations were Finland, Czechoslovakia, Sweden and Switzerland. Alpine skiing and Cross-country skiing were the only sports being introduced at the competition.

Women were not allowed to participate at the inaugural Winter Deaflympics.

== Medal table ==
* Host nation (Austria)

Rank	Nation	Gold	Silver	Bronze	Total
1	Switzerland (SWI)	3	0	1	4
2	Finland (FIN)	1	2	0	3
3	Sweden (SWE)	1	1	0	2
4	Austria (AUT)*	0	3	3	6
5	Czechoslovakia (CZS)	0	0	0	0
Totals (5 entries)		5	6	4	15

Preceded by none	1949; I Seefield, Austria	Succeeded by 1928 II; Oslo, Norway
