= 1949 Summer Deaflympics =

6th Summer Deaflympics

6th Summer Deaflympics
- Host city: Copenhagen, Denmark
- Nations: 14 countries
- Athletes: 391 athletes
- Events: 51 (9 disciplines)
- Opening: 12 August 1949
- Closing: 16 August 1949

Summer

Winter

The 1949 Summer Deaflympics (Danish: 1949 Sommer Deaflympics) officially known as the 6th Deaf Olympiad (Danish: 6. DøveOlympiade) is an international multi-sport event that was held from 12 August 1949 to 16 August 1949. This event was hosted in Copenhagen, Denmark and attended by 391 athletes (342 men and 49 women).This Deaflympics was held after 10 years since the last edition of the Deaflympics(1939) due to World War II.

Basketball and water polo were added as events for the first time in Deaflympics history.

== Participating Countries ==
The following countries participated in the 1949 Deaflympics:

- Austria
- Belgium
- Czechoslovakia
- Denmark
- Finland
- France
- (United Kingdom) Great Britain
- Italy
- Netherlands
- Norway
- Sweden
- Switzerland
- United States of America
- (Socialist Federal Republic of Yugoslavia) Yugoslavia

== Sports ==
=== Individual sports ===
- Athletics
- Cycling
- Diving
- Shooting
- Swimming
- Tennis
- Water polo

=== Team sports ===
- Basketball
- Football

== Medal table ==
* Host nation (Denmark)

1949 Summer Deaflympics medal table
Rank	NOC	Gold	Silver	Bronze	Total
1	Denmark (DEN)*	11	9	10	30
2	Finland (FIN)	11	6	8	25
3	Netherlands (NED)	7	5	1	13
4	Sweden (SWE)	6	14	6	26
5	Norway (NOR)	5	3	6	14
6	Great Britain (GBR)	5	1	0	6
7	France (FRA)	4	6	4	14
8	Belgium (BEL)	1	3	1	5
9	Italy (ITA)	1	1	3	5
10	Switzerland (SUI)	0	1	3	4
11	United States (USA)	0	1	0	1
12	Czechoslovakia (TCH)	0	0	2	2
13	Yugoslavia (YUG)	0	0	1	1
14	Austria (AUT)	0	0	0	0
Totals (14 entries)		51	50	45	146

== Results ==
=== Athletics ===
Event	Gold	Silver	Bronze
Men 100m	Roger Cantrelle; France	Robert Ellsworth Miller; United States	Aurelio Marcucci; Italy
Women 100m	Eileen Rose Dukes; Great Britain	Gunnel Sandstrom; Finland	Ellen Mǿller; Denmark
Men 200m	Roger Cantrelle; France	Gustaf Sven Lorentz Engstrom; Sweden	Karl Gustav Astrom; Sweden
Men 400m	Kunto Irri; Finland	Toivo Tviikael Tarvonen; Finland	Gustaf Sven Lorentz Engstrom; Sweden
Men 800m	Alfred Karstensen Nielsen; Denmark	Toivo Tviikael Tarvonen; Finland	Kristian Mǿller; Denmark
Men 1500m	Knut Olof Arvid Gardell; Sweden	Arne Lennart Larsson; Sweden	Alfred Karstensen Nielsen; Denmark
Men 5000m	Olof Johansson; Sweden	Knut Olof Arvid Gardell; Sweden	Max Jean David; France
Men 10000m	Max Jean David; France	Olof Johansson; Sweden	Väinö Pelli; Finland
Men 110m Hurdles	Pierre Galloy; France	Borge Nielsen; Denmark	Marcel Alie; France
Men 400m Hurdles	Veikko Koskinen; Finland	Pierre Galloy; France	Bent Pedersen; Denmark
Men 4 × 100 m Relay	Sweden (SWE); Karl Gustav Astrom; Bertil Karl Baath; Tage Bernhard Engberg; Gustaf Sven Lorentz Engstrom	Denmark (DEN); Volmer Christiansen; Holger Johansson; Aksel Peder Olsen; Freddy Samsǿe	Yugoslavia (YUG); Misdrag Milovanov; Milenko Svircevic; Bozidar Tironi
Women 4x100 Relay	Norway (NOR); Margit Bolstad; Bjørg Braathen; Inger Wilhelmine Ovreeide; Birgit Marie Rafoss	Sweden (SWE); Karin Andersson; Sonja Andersson; Tora Linnea Hansen; Rut Henny Wikman (Note: Only Norway and Sweden were recorded as competing in this event.)	
Men 4 × 400 m Relay	Finland (FIN); Kunto Irri; Veikko Koskinen; Toivo Tviikael Tarvonen; Voitto Wickholm	Sweden (SWE); Bertil Karl Baath; Gustaf Sven Lorentz Engstrom; Mauritz Olsson; Gunnar Karl Renner	Denmark (DEN); Kristian Mǿller; Alfred Karstensen Nielsen; Aksel Peder Olsen; Børge Anders Rasmussen
Men Olympic Relay	Finland (FIN); Kunto Irri; Veikko Koskinen; Sulo Valfrid Rannikko; Toivo Tviikael Tarvonen	Sweden (SWE); Karl Gustav Astrom; Bertil Karl Baath; Tage Bernhard Engberg; Gustaf Sven Lorentz Engstrom	Denmark (DEN); Volmer Christiansen; Kristian Mǿller; Børge Anders Rasmussen; Freddy Samsǿe
Men High Jump	Bror-Erik Södergård; Finland	Endre Grytnes; Norway	Sulo Valfrid Rannikko; Finland
Women High Jump	Birgit Marie Rafoss; Norway	Ellen Mǿller; Denmark	Gunnel Sandstrom; Finland
Men Pole Vault	Tenho Veikko Broman; Finland	Borge Nielsen; Denmark	Endre Grytnes; Norway
Men Long Jump	Bror-Erik Södergård; Finland	Endre Grytnes; Norway	Knut Smedsgaard; Norway
Women Long Jump	Ellen Mǿller; Denmark	Gunnel Sandstrom; Finland	Birgit Marie Rafoss; Norway
Men Triple Jump	Bror-Erik Södergård; Finland	Karl Gustav Astrom; Sweden	Evert Aukusti Viitala; Finland
Men Shot Put	Valentin Kaurela; Finland	Karl Gustav Astrom; Sweden	Nils Erik Berggren; Sweden
Women Shot Put	Birgit Marie Rafoss; Norway	Marie Hansen; Denmark	Gunnel Sandstrom; Finland
Men Discus Throw	Knut Smedsgaard; Norway	Karl Gustav Astrom; Sweden	Evert Aukusti Viitala; Finland
Men Javelin Throw	Robert Oman; Sweden	Lauri Matias Hamalainen; Finland	Eero Edvard Ojala; Finland

=== Basketball ===
Event	Gold	Silver	Bronze
Men Basketball	Belgium (BEL); Joseph Blum, Jacques Brosemer, Jean Crabbé, Pierre Gosselin, Jean Hiroux, Antoine Lichtfous, Fortune Stradiot, Victor van Laer	Switzerland (SUI); Lucien Aubert, Otto-Edouard Fricker, Raymond Genton, Paul Mollard, Robert Pilet, Fernand Rohrer (Note: Only Belgium and Switzerland competed in this event.)	

=== Cycling ===
Event	Gold	Silver	Bronze
Road Men Individual Road Race	Thomas Norman Clarke; Great Britain	Pierre Keller; France	Luigi Bergonzi; Italy

=== Diving ===
Event	Gold	Silver	Bronze
Men Diving 3m springboard	Henning Christensen; Denmark	Frans Callaerts (Note: Only Denmark and the Belgium participated in this event.); Belgium	

=== Football ===
Event	Gold	Silver	Bronze
Men Football	Great Britain (GBR); James Attwood; Raymond Leslie Bolton; John Joseph Cashmore; Walter Chapman; Walter Dennis Drake; Philip French; Harold Higgs; Thomas George (Moules) Kisby; Charles Lowndes; Charles Molloy; James Martin Smith; Peter Henry Stokes	Belgium (BEL); Leopold Baiwir; Emile Basselet; Adolf D'hondt; Julien Delamotte; Eugene Fraiture; Marcel Leon Francois; Peetrus Meert; Emile Peers; Robert Quivreux; Gustave Leonard Rysermans; Willy Achille Seeuws; Gerard Sonneville; Harry Trab; Francois Van Der Linden; Edward Jacob Verheezen; Louis Williame	Italy (ITA); Dino Amonaci; Ernesto Benvenuto; Livio Cavalli; Ugo Curti; Pietro De Stefani; Silvio Fassi; Italo Gasparini; Enrico Sergio Gasparoni; Battista Lodigiani; Ugo Magnetto; Giuseppe Maina; Mario Mauri; Arturo Mazzola; Luciano Minari; Renato Mirto; Ivano Moroni; Gianni Ornaghi; Gaetano Santolini; Luigi Zanni

=== Shooting ===
Event	Gold	Silver	Bronze
Men shooting army rifle 200m	Bruno Mouton; Finland	Stig Wilhelm Jakobsson; Sweden	Torsten Forstèn; Finland
Men shooting army rifle 300m	Anders Haukedalen; Norway	Niilo Mikkola; Finland	Robert Pilet; Switzerland
Men Shooting team classification	Finland (FIN); Torsten Forstèn; Niilo Mikkola; Bruno Mouton	Norway (NOR); Anker Carsten Gusfre; Ingvald Fredrik Hagen; Anders Haukedalen	Switzerland (SUI); Walter Homberger; Robert Pilet; A. Pittet (Note: The full first name of this participant is not recorded.)

=== List of sports ===
- 100m Men
- 100m Women
- 200m
- 400m
- 800m
- 1500m
- 5000m
- 10000m
- 110m Hurdles
- 400m Hurdles
- High Jump Men
- High Jump Women
- Pole Vault
- Long Jump Men
- Long Jump Women
- Triple Jump
- Shot Put Men
- Shot Put Women
- Discus Throw
- Javelin Throw
- 4X100m Relay Men
- 4X100m Relay Women
- 4X400m Relay
- Olympic Relay
- Basketball
- Cycling- Road Individual
- Diving 3m Springboard
- Football
- Shooting Army Rifle 300m
- Shooting Team Classification
- Shooting Army Rifle 200m
- Swimming 100m FreestyleMen
- Swimming 100m Freestyle Women
- Swimming 200m Freestyle Women
- Swimming 400m Freestyle Men
- Swimming 400m Freestyle Women
- Swimming 1500m Freestyle
- Swimming 100m Backstroke Men
- Swimming 100m Backstroke Women
- Swimming 200m Breaststroke Men
- Swimming 200m Breaststroke Women
- Swimming 4 × 100 m Freestyle Relay Men
- Swimming 4X50m Freestyle Relay Women
- Swimming 3x100m Medley Men
- Swimming 3x50m Medley Women
- Tennis Singles Men
- Tennis Singles Women
- Tennis Doubles Men
- Tennis Doubles Women
- Tennis Mixed Doubles
- Water Polo

== Notes ==
Preceded by 1939 V Stockholm, Sweden	1949; VI; Copenhagen, Denmark	Succeeded by 1953 VII; Brussels, Belgium
