= 2023 Winter Deaflympics =

20th Winter Deaflympics

20th Winter Deaflympics
- Host city: Erzurum; Turkey
- Nations: 34
- Athletes: 534 (314 men and 220 women)
- Events: 34 in 6 sports
- Opening: 2 March 2024
- Closing: 12 March 2024
- Opened by: Mustafa Çiftçi

Winter

Summer

The 2023 Winter Deaflympics, officially known as the 20th Winter Deaflympics or XX Winter Deaflympics, was the 20th edition of the Winter Deaflympics, and took place between 2–12 March 2024 in Erzurum in Turkey.

The multi-sport event was originally planned to be held in 2023, but the event was pushed towards the early part of March 2024 due to the impact of the COVID-19 pandemic. The 2023 edition of the Winter Deaflympics was the third largest international sporting event to be held in Erzurum after the city had previously hosted the 2011 Winter Universiade and 2017 European Youth Olympic Winter Festival. The United States, Sweden, Canada and Finland withdrew their delegations from the games due to security concerns and geopolitical tensions surrounding West Asia. Israel also withdrew from the competition due to Turkey's souring diplomatic relations with Israel over the Israel-Gaza tensions.

Six sports were included in the final list of games programme including alpine skiing, chess, cross-country skiing, curling, futsal, and snowboarding. Futsal made its debut at the 2024 Winter Deaflympics. Ice hockey, which was initially slotted by the organizers in the draft plan of the games, had to be scrapped from the agenda of action items due to the withdrawal of the United States of America, Sweden, Canada, and Finland.

Approximately 534 athletes from 34 countries competed at the games and a total of 34 events in 6 sports. Eight countries including Algeria, Greece, Iran, Ireland, Latvia, Kuwait, Serbia and Thailand made their debuts at the Winter Deaflympics during the course of the multi-sport event. Ukraine topped the medal table with a haul of 10 gold medals and a total of 19 medals.

== Bidding ==
Reports surfaced in 2018 over the formal launch of bidding processes by the International Committee of Sports for the Deaf to choose the official host cities for both 2021 Summer Deaflympics and 2023 Winter Deaflympics. ICSD marked 1 July 2019 as the deadline for the bidding proposals to be submitted by the interested nations in order to finalise the host cities for both 2021 Summer Deaflympics and 2023 Winter Deaflympics.

The International Committee of Sports for the Deaf revealed that their bidding process to both events had been formulated in line with the core principles used by the International Olympic Committee’s Agenda 2020+5.

== Participating nations ==
In a press conference some days before the Games, the Erzurum Governor Mustafa Çiftçi confirmed that the US, Canada, Sweden and Finland had withdrawn from taking part at the 20th Winter Deaflympics owing to the Israel-Palestinian conflict in the Middle East region and due to the political stance of the USA on Israel-Gaza tensions. This situation led to the cancellation of the ice hockey tournament, as the four countries along Turkey and Ukraine had registered their delegations for the event.

- Algeria (12)
- Armenia (4)
- Austria (6)
- Bosnia and Herzegovina (6)
- Brazil (30)
- China (27)
- Croatia (13)
- Czech Republic (14)
- France (5)
- Germany (21)
- Great Britain (13)
- Greece (1)
- Hungary (17)
- India (7)
- Iran (13)
- Ireland (9)
- Italy (42)
- Japan (39)
- Kazakhstan (27)
- South Korea (18)
- Kuwait (13)
- Latvia (2)
- Mongolia (2)
- Netherlands (12)
- Pakistan (1)
- Poland (32)
- Serbia (4)
- Slovakia (2)
- Spain (21)
- Switzerland (8)
- Thailand (14)
- Turkey (55)
- Ukraine (35)
- Uzbekistan (9)

== Sports ==
The 2024 Winter Deaflympics featured a total of 34 finals in 6 sports were held, two less than 5 years before in the province of Sondrio. Although originally planned, the men's ice hockey tournament and the mixed relay in the cross-country skiing ended up being canceled due to the lack of registered teams. Futsal made its debut, at the same time as the curling mixed doubles event, the mixed teams in chess and the parallel events at the alpine skiing, replacing the downhill events. Another drastic change happened in snowboarding with the reduction in the number of events from 10 to 6. Thus, border cross, big air and slopestyle were removed from the program because of Erzurum's infrastructure. In its place, two events were added in the banked slalom. This was the last edition in which Chess was part of the sports program, as in September 2022, CISS decided that the sport from 2029 onwards will be relocated to the Summer Games.

- Chess (5)
- Curling (3)
- Futsal (2)
- Skiing
  - Alpine skiing (10)
  - Cross-country skiing (8)
  - Snowboarding (6)

== Results ==
1. Curling
2. Futsal
3. Alpine Skiing
4. Chess
5. Cross Country Skiing
6. Snowboarding

== Calendar ==
OC	Opening ceremony	●	Event competitions	1	Gold medal events	CC	Closing ceremony

February/March	29th Thu	1st Fri	2nd Sat	3rd Sun	4th Mon	5th Tue	6th Wed	7th Thu	8th Fri	9th Sat	10st Sun	11th Mon	12th Tue	Events
Ceremonies			OC										CC	—N/a
Alpine skiing				2		2		2		2		2		10
Chess				2	●	1		●	●	●	●	●	2	5
Cross-country skiing				2		2		2		2				8
Curling	●	●	●	●	●	1	●	●	●	●	●	2		2
Futsal					●	●	●	●	●	●	●	1	1	1
Snowboarding					2		2		2					6
Daily medal events				6	2	6	2	4	2	4	0	5	3	34
Cumulative total				6	8	14	16	20	22	26	26	31	34	34
February/March	29th Thu	1st Fri	2nd Sat	3rd Sun	4th Mon	5th Tue	6th Wed	7th Thu	8th Fri	9th Sat	10st Sun	11th Mon	12th Tue	Events

== Medal table ==
* Host nation (Turkey)

Rank	Nation	Gold	Silver	Bronze	Total
1	Ukraine (UKR)	10	5	4	19
2	China (CHN)	7	7	6	20
3	Austria (AUT)	6	1	3	10
4	Poland (POL)	5	4	0	9
5	Italy (ITA)	1	3	2	6
6	France (FRA)	1	2	5	8
7	Croatia (CRO)	1	1	0	2
8	Iran (IRI)	1	0	0	1
8	Latvia (LAT)	1	0	0	1
8	Spain (ESP)	1	0	0	1
11	Japan (JPN)	0	4	3	7
12	Germany (GER)	0	3	2	5
13	South Korea (KOR)	0	2	2	4
14	Hungary (HUN)	0	1	2	3
15	Brazil (BRA)	0	1	1	2
16	Kazakhstan (KAZ)	0	0	1	1
16	Serbia (SRB)	0	0	1	1
16	Slovakia (SVK)	0	0	1	1
16	Switzerland (SUI)	0	0	1	1
Totals (19 entries)		34	34	34	102
