= 1965 Summer Deaflympics =

10th Summer Deaflympics

10th Summer Deaflympics
- Host city: Washington D.C., United States
- Nations: 27 countries
- Athletes: 687 athletes
- Events: 85 (11 disciplines)
- Opening: June 27, 1965
- Closing: July 3, 1965
- Opened by: Lyndon B. Johnson

Summer

Winter

The 1965 Summer Deaflympics, officially known as the 10th Summer Deaflympics, is an international multi-sport event that was celebrated from June 27 to July 3, 1965, in Washington D.C., United States. This is the first Deaflympics to be hosted outside of Europe, and the first Deaflympics to be hosted in Americas.

== Sports ==
- Athletics
- Basketball
- Cycling
- Diving
- Football
- Shooting
- Swimming
- Table Tennis
- Tennis
- Wrestling

== Medal tally ==
* Host nation (United States)

1965 Summer Deaflympics medal table
Rank	NOC	Gold	Silver	Bronze	Total
1	Soviet Union (URS)	30	15	9	54
2	United States (USA)*	9	20	23	52
3	Poland (POL)	9	10	6	25
4	Hungary (HUN)	7	8	4	19
5	Italy (ITA)	6	5	11	22
6	West Germany (FRG)	5	4	7	16
7	Denmark (DEN)	5	1	3	9
8	Great Britain (GBR)	3	6	5	14
9	Iran (IRI)	3	6	0	9
10	Canada (CAN)	3	0	4	7
11	Finland (FIN)	1	2	4	7
12	Norway (NOR)	1	2	1	4
13	Yugoslavia (YUG)	1	1	1	3
14	Australia (AUS)	1	1	0	2
15	Switzerland (SUI)	1	0	1	2
16	France (FRA)	0	1	1	2
16	Japan (JPN)	0	1	1	2
16	Netherlands (NED)	0	1	1	2
19	Argentina (ARG)	0	1	0	1
20	Sweden (SWE)	0	0	2	2
21	Belgium (BEL)	0	0	1	1
Totals (21 entries)		85	85	85	255

Preceded by 1961 IX; Helsinki, Finland	1965; X Washington D.C., USA	Succeeded by 1969 XI; Belgrade, Yugoslavia
