= 1977 Summer Deaflympics =

13th Summer Deaflympics

13th Summer Deaflympics
- Host city: Bucharest, Romania
- Nations: 32 countries
- Athletes: 1150 athletes
- Events: 105 (13 disciplines)
- Opening: July 17, 1977
- Closing: July 27, 1977
- Opened by: Nicolae Ceauşescu

Summer

Winter

The 1977 Summer Deaflympics (Romanian: Al 1977 diapimpic de vară), officially known as the 13th Summer Deaflympics (Romanian: Al 13-lea diapimpic de vară), is an international multi-sport event that was celebrated from July 17 to July 27, 1977, in Bucharest, Romania.

== Sports ==
- Athletics
- Basketball
- Cycling
- Football
- Handball
- Shooting
- Swimming
- Table Tennis
- Tennis
- Volleyball
- Water Polo
- Wrestling

== Medal tally ==
* Host nation (Romania)

1977 Summer Deaflympics medal table
Rank	NOC	Gold	Silver	Bronze	Total
1	United States (USA)	38	35	32	105
2	Soviet Union (URS)	26	17	22	65
3	Iran (IRI)	8	4	4	16
4	Italy (ITA)	6	3	6	15
5	Japan (JPN)	5	2	0	7
6	West Germany (FRG)	4	6	6	16
7	Yugoslavia (YUG)	4	4	1	9
8	Romania (ROU)*	4	0	4	8
9	Canada (CAN)	2	5	7	14
10	Sweden (SWE)	2	3	1	6
11	Bulgaria (BUL)	1	7	3	11
12	Hungary (HUN)	1	3	3	7
13	Belgium (BEL)	1	3	1	5
14	Denmark (DEN)	1	2	0	3
15	East Germany (GDR)	1	1	3	5
16	Norway (NOR)	1	1	0	2
17	Australia (AUS)	1	0	4	5
18	Poland (POL)	0	4	6	10
19	France (FRA)	0	4	1	5
20	Finland (FIN)	0	1	2	3
21	Ireland (IRL)	0	1	0	1
Totals (21 entries)		106	106	106	318

== Notable achievements ==
Jeff Float won 10 gold medals for swimming in this competition, a record in the Deaflympics.

Preceded by 1973 XII; Malmo, Sweden	1977; XIII; Bucharest, Romania	Succeeded by 1981 XIV; Cologne, West Germany
