= 1957 Summer Deaflympics =

8th Summer Deaflympics

8th Summer Deaflympics
- Host city: Milan, Italy
- Nations: 25 countries
- Athletes: 635 athletes
- Events: 66 (11 disciplines)
- Opening: 25 August 1957
- Closing: 30 August 1957

Summer

Winter

The 1957 Summer Deaflympics (Italian: 1957 Olimpiadi estive per sordi) officially known as 8th Summer Deaflympics (Italian: 8° Olimpiadi estive per i sordi) is an international multi-sport event that was held from 25 to 30 August 1957. This event was hosted by Milan, Italy.

== Sports ==
- Athletics
- Gymnastics
- Basketball
- Diving
- Tennis
- Table tennis
- Swimming
- Football
- Shooting
- Water polo

== Medal tally ==
* Host nation (Italy)

1957 Summer Deaflympics medal table
Rank	NOC	Gold	Silver	Bronze	Total
1	West Germany (FRG)	13	10	16	39
2	Soviet Union (URS)	13	8	4	25
3	Hungary (HUN)	11	6	2	19
4	United States (USA)	7	5	10	22
5	Italy (ITA)*	4	3	11	18
6	Denmark (DEN)	4	1	3	8
7	Poland (POL)	3	6	3	12
8	Bulgaria (BUL)	3	0	1	4
9	Netherlands (NED)	2	5	3	10
10	Czechoslovakia (TCH)	2	2	2	6
11	Yugoslavia (YUG)	2	0	2	4
12	Great Britain (GBR)	1	8	1	10
13	Switzerland (SUI)	1	0	0	1
14	Romania (ROU)	0	7	2	9
15	Finland (FIN)	0	3	3	6
16	Belgium (BEL)	0	1	2	3
17	France (FRA)	0	1	1	2
Totals (17 entries)		66	66	66	198

Preceded by 1961 VII; Brussels, Belgium	1965; VIII; Milan, Italy	Succeeded by 1969 IX; Helsinki, Finland
