= 1989 Summer Deaflympics =

Multi-sport event for deaf athletes

16th Summer Deaflympics
- Host city: Christchurch, New Zealand
- Athletes: 955 athletes
- Events: 120 (13 disciples)
- Opening: 7 January 1989
- Closing: 17 January 1989
- Opened by: David Cargill
- Main venue: Queen Elizabeth II Park

Summer

Winter

The 1989 Summer Deaflympics, officially known as the 16th Summer Deaflympics, is an international multi-sport event that was held from 7 to 17 January 1989 at Queen Elizabeth II Park in Christchurch, New Zealand.

== Medal tally ==
* Host nation (New Zealand)

1989 Summer Deaflympics medal table
Rank	NOC	Gold	Silver	Bronze	Total
1	United States (USA)	22	30	23	75
2	West Germany (FRG)	18	21	16	55
3	Soviet Union (URS)	18	19	23	60
4	Great Britain (GBR)	12	9	6	27
5	Iran (IRI)	10	4	5	19
6	Australia (AUS)	10	3	9	22
7	Italy (ITA)	8	11	4	23
8	Japan (JPN)	7	3	4	14
9	Sweden (SWE)	5	2	1	8
10	Norway (NOR)	4	5	7	16
11	Ireland (IRL)	3	3	0	6
12	Canada (CAN)	3	2	2	7
13	India (IND)	2	1	0	3
14	Netherlands (NED)	1	3	1	5
15	Finland (FIN)	1	2	5	8
16	New Zealand (NZL)*	1	2	4	7
17	France (FRA)	1	1	1	3
18	Bulgaria (BUL)	0	2	4	6
19	Poland (POL)	0	1	4	5
20	Belgium (BEL)	0	1	2	3
21	Denmark (DEN)	0	1	1	2
22	Turkey (TUR)	0	0	2	2
23	China (CHN)	0	0	1	1
23	Switzerland (SUI)	0	0	1	1
Totals (24 entries)		126	126	126	378

Preceded by 1985 XV; Los Angeles, United States	1989 Summer Deaflympics; XVI; Christchurch, New Zealand	Succeeded by 1993 XVII; Sofia, Bulgaria
