= 1973 Summer Deaflympics =

12th Summer Deaflympics

12th Summer Deaflympics
- Host city: Malmö, Sweden
- Nations: 31 countries
- Athletes: 1116 athletes
- Events: 97 (12 disciplines)
- Opening: 21 July 1973
- Closing: 28 July 1973

Summer

Winter

The 1977 Summer Deaflympics (Swedish: 1977 Sommardeaflympics) officially known as 12th International Silent Games (Swedish: 12: e Internationella Tysta Spelen), was an international multi-sport event that was held from 21 to 28 July in Malmö, Sweden.

== Sports ==
- Athletics
- Basketball
- Cycling
- Diving
- Football
- Handball
- Shooting
- Swimming
- Table Tennis
- Tennis
- Volleyball
- Wrestling

== Medal tally ==
* Host nation (Sweden)

1973 Summer Deaflympics medal table
Rank	NOC	Gold	Silver	Bronze	Total
1	United States (USA)	30	22	31	83
2	Soviet Union (URS)	26	14	9	49
3	Italy (ITA)	7	2	7	16
4	West Germany (FRG)	4	5	4	13
5	Norway (NOR)	4	1	0	5
6	Bulgaria (BUL)	3	7	7	17
7	Hungary (HUN)	3	3	4	10
7	Yugoslavia (YUG)	3	3	4	10
9	France (FRA)	3	3	1	7
10	Japan (JPN)	3	2	0	5
11	Iran (IRI)	2	4	1	7
12	East Germany (GDR)	2	3	2	7
13	Finland (FIN)	2	2	2	6
14	Great Britain (GBR)	1	6	3	10
15	Poland (POL)	1	5	6	12
16	Sweden (SWE)*	1	4	2	7
17	Belgium (BEL)	1	3	2	6
18	Denmark (DEN)	1	2	4	7
19	Canada (CAN)	0	2	3	5
20	Switzerland (SUI)	0	2	2	4
21	Netherlands (NED)	0	1	1	2
22	Australia (AUS)	0	1	0	1
23	Romania (ROU)	0	0	2	2
Totals (23 entries)		97	97	97	291

== Notes ==
Preceded by 1969 XI; London, Great Britain	1973; V Stockholm, Sweden	Succeeded by 1977 XIII; Bucharest,Romania
