= 1969 Summer Deaflympics =

International multi-sport event for deaf individuals held in Yugoslavia

11th Summer Deaflympics
- Host city: Belgrade, Yugoslavia
- Nations: 33 countries
- Athletes: 1189 athletes
- Events: 105 (13 disciplines)
- Opening: August 9, 1969
- Closing: August 16, 1969
- Opened by: Josip Broz Tito

Summer

Winter

The 1969 Summer Deaflympics (Serbian: Летње олимпијаде глувих 1969), officially known as the 11th Summer Deaflympics (Serbian: 11. Ljetne Olimpijske igre gluhih), was an international multi-sport event held from August 9 to 16, 1969, in Belgrade, Yugoslavia.

== Sports ==
- Artistic Gymnastics
- Athletics
- Basketball
- Cycling
- Diving
- Football
- Handball
- Shooting
- Swimming
- Table Tennis
- Tennis
- Volleyball
- Water Polo
- Wrestling

== Medal tally ==
* Host nation (Yugoslavia)

1969 Summer Deaflympics medal table
Rank	NOC	Gold	Silver	Bronze	Total
1	Soviet Union (URS)	36	32	29	97
2	United States (USA)	22	23	21	66
3	Hungary (HUN)	8	4	8	20
4	Italy (ITA)	7	6	8	21
5	West Germany (FRG)	6	2	2	10
6	Iran (IRI)	5	2	3	10
7	Poland (POL)	4	6	8	18
8	Yugoslavia (YUG)*	3	2	8	13
9	East Germany (GDR)	3	2	2	7
10	Canada (CAN)	2	4	1	7
11	Finland (FIN)	2	2	2	6
12	Great Britain (GBR)	2	2	0	4
13	Bulgaria (BUL)	1	6	5	12
14	Denmark (DEN)	1	4	1	6
15	Sweden (SWE)	1	1	4	6
16	Argentina (ARG)	1	1	0	2
17	Norway (NOR)	1	0	0	1
18	Japan (JPN)	0	3	7	10
19	Czechoslovakia (TCH)	0	2	1	3
20	Switzerland (SUI)	0	2	0	2
21	Australia (AUS)	0	1	0	1
22	Netherlands (NED)	0	0	3	3
22	Romania (ROU)	0	0	3	3
24	Colombia (COL)	0	0	1	1
24	France (FRA)	0	0	1	1
Totals (25 entries)		105	107	118	330

Preceded by 1965 X Washington D.C., USA	1969 Summer Deaflympics; XI; Belgrade, Yugoslavia	Succeeded by 1973 XII; Malmö, Sweden
