= 1981 Summer Deaflympics =

14th Summer Deaflympics

14th Summer Deaflympics
- Host city: Cologne, Germany
- Nations: 32 countries
- Athletes: 1198 athletes
- Events: 110 (13 disciplines)
- Opening: July 23, 1981
- Closing: August 1, 1981
- Opened by: Helmut Schmidt

Summer

Winter

The 1981 Summer Deaflympics (German: 1981 Sommer Deaflympics), officially known as the 14th Summer Deaflympics (German: 14. Sommer Deaflympics), is an international multi-sport event that was celebrated from July 23 to August 1, 1981, in Cologne, Germany.

== Sports ==
- Athletics
- Basketball
- Cycling
- Football
- Handball
- Shooting
- Swimming
- Table Tennis
- Tennis
- Volleyball
- Water Polo
- Wrestling

== Medal tally ==
* Host nation (West Germany)

1985 Summer Deaflympics medal table
| Rank | NOC | Gold | Silver | Bronze | Total |
|---|---|---|---|---|---|
| 1 | United States (USA) | 45 | 30 | 34 | 109 |
| 2 | Soviet Union (URS) | 22 | 20 | 15 | 57 |
| 3 | Iran (IRI) | 8 | 5 | 2 | 15 |
| 4 | Japan (JPN) | 7 | 4 | 2 | 13 |
| 5 | Yugoslavia (YUG) | 5 | 0 | 2 | 7 |
| 6 | West Germany (FRG)* | 3 | 7 | 14 | 24 |
| 7 | Australia (AUS) | 3 | 3 | 3 | 9 |
| 8 | Finland (FIN) | 3 | 0 | 0 | 3 |
| 9 | Italy (ITA) | 2 | 8 | 3 | 13 |
| 10 | Bulgaria (BUL) | 2 | 7 | 5 | 14 |
| 11 | Austria (AUT) | 2 | 1 | 0 | 3 |
| 12 | France (FRA) | 1 | 5 | 5 | 11 |
| 13 | Hungary (HUN) | 1 | 3 | 2 | 6 |
| 14 | Poland (POL) | 1 | 2 | 4 | 7 |
| 15 | East Germany (GDR) | 1 | 2 | 0 | 3 |
| 15 | New Zealand (NZL) | 1 | 2 | 0 | 3 |
| 17 | Denmark (DEN) | 1 | 1 | 4 | 6 |
| 18 | Sweden (SWE) | 1 | 1 | 1 | 3 |
| 19 | Netherlands (NED) | 1 | 0 | 0 | 1 |
| 20 | Canada (CAN) | 0 | 4 | 4 | 8 |
| 21 | India (IND) | 0 | 2 | 1 | 3 |
| 22 | Switzerland (SUI) | 0 | 2 | 0 | 2 |
| 23 | Great Britain (GBR) | 0 | 1 | 5 | 6 |
| 24 | Belgium (BEL) | 0 | 0 | 2 | 2 |
| 25 | Norway (NOR) | 0 | 0 | 1 | 1 |
| 25 | Spain (ESP) | 0 | 0 | 1 | 1 |
| Totals (26 entries) | | 110 | 110 | 110 | 330 |

| Preceded by 1977 XIII; Bucharest, Romania | 1981 Summer Deaflympics; XIV; Cologne, Germany | Succeeded by 1985 XV; Los Angeles, USA |
