= 1985 Summer Deaflympics =

15th Summer Deaflympics

15th Summer Deaflympics
- Host city: Los Angeles, California, United States
- Nations: 29 countries
- Athletes: 1053 athletes
- Events: 96 (12 disciplines)
- Opening: July 10, 1985
- Closing: July 20, 1985
- Opened by: Ronald Reagan
- Main venue: Los Angeles Memorial Coliseum

Summer

Winter

The 1985 Summer Deaflympics, officially known as the 15th Summer Deaflympics, is an international multi-sport event that was celebrated from July 10 to July 20, 1985 (a year after the 1984 Summer Olympics), in Los Angeles, California United States.

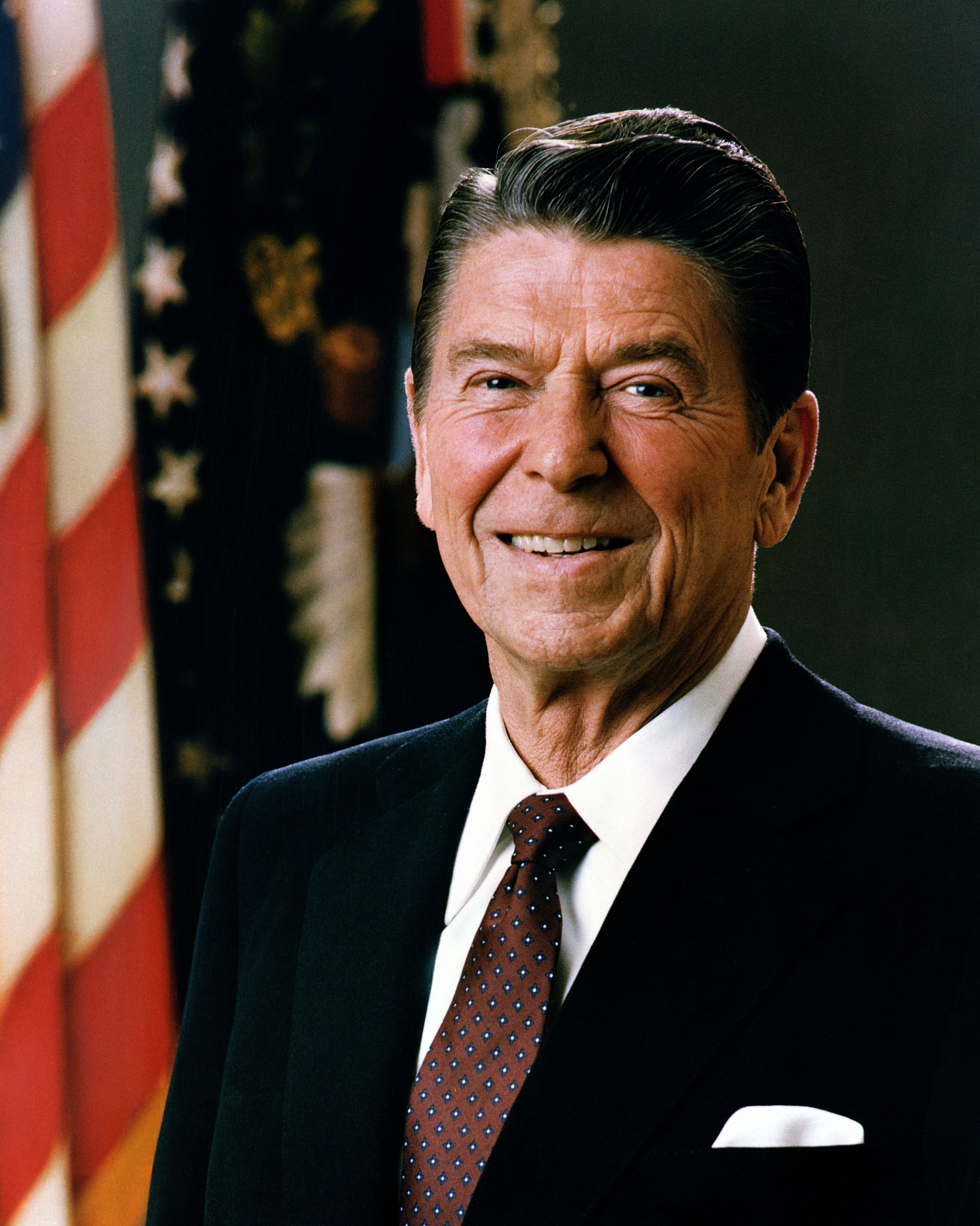
Ronald Reagan, official of opening ceremony

== Sports ==
- Athletics
- Badminton
- Basketball
- Cycling
- Football
- Handball
- Shooting
- Swimming
- Table Tennis
- Tennis
- Volleyball
- Water Polo

== Medal tally ==
* Host nation (United States)

1985 Summer Deaflympics medal table
Rank	NOC	Gold	Silver	Bronze	Total
1	United States (USA)*	46	30	33	109
2	Japan (JPN)	8	4	2	14
3	West Germany (FRG)	7	19	13	39
4	France (FRA)	6	9	9	24
5	Great Britain (GBR)	5	11	10	26
6	Australia (AUS)	5	1	3	9
7	Ireland (IRL)	4	1	1	6
8	Italy (ITA)	3	2	6	11
9	Norway (NOR)	3	2	2	7
10	New Zealand (NZL)	2	1	0	3
11	Poland (POL)	1	4	5	10
12	Belgium (BEL)	1	2	2	5
13	Finland (FIN)	1	2	1	4
14	Denmark (DEN)	1	1	3	5
15	Canada (CAN)	1	1	1	3
16	Netherlands (NED)	1	0	0	1
16	Yugoslavia (YUG)	1	0	0	1
18	Sweden (SWE)	0	4	1	5
19	Hungary (HUN)	0	1	2	3
20	Austria (AUT)	0	1	0	1
21	India (IND)	0	0	1	1
21	Switzerland (SUI)	0	0	1	1
Totals (22 entries)		96	96	96	288

Preceded by 1981 XIV; Cologne, Germany	1985 Summer Deaflympics; XV; Los Angeles, USA	Succeeded by 1989 XVI; Christchurch, New Zealand
