= 1993 Summer Deaflympics =

17th Summer Deaflympics

17th Summer Deaflympics
- Host city: Sofia, Bulgaria
- Nations: 52 countries
- Athletes: 1679 athletes
- Events: 126 (14 disciplines)
- Opening: 24 July 1993
- Closing: 2 August 1993

Summer

Winter

The 1993 Summer Deaflympics (Bulgarian: 1993 летни дефлимпийски игри), officially known as the 17th Summer Deaflympics (Bulgarian: 13-та лятна глуха олимпиада) is an international multi-sport event that was held from 24 July 1993 to 2 August 1993. The event was hosted by Sofia, Bulgaria.

It was the first Deaflympic event in which more than 50 nations participated. The Summer Games included 14 different disciplines.

== Medal tally ==
* Host nation (Bulgaria)

1993 Summer Deaflympics medal table
Rank	NOC	Gold	Silver	Bronze	Total
1	United States (USA)	36	25	23	84
2	Russia (RUS)	16	10	18	44
3	Iran (IRI)	11	4	3	18
4	Germany (GER)	8	16	15	39
5	Italy (ITA)	7	8	5	20
6	Canada (CAN)	6	10	4	20
7	Belarus (BLR)	5	2	3	10
8	India (IND)	5	0	2	7
9	Japan (JPN)	4	7	6	17
10	Netherlands (NED)	4	2	2	8
11	Czech Republic (CZE)	3	2	2	7
12	Australia (AUS)	3	1	1	5
13	Bulgaria (BUL)*	2	5	4	11
14	Ukraine (UKR)	2	4	2	8
15	France (FRA)	2	2	3	7
16	Norway (NOR)	2	2	0	4
17	Ireland (IRL)	2	1	3	6
18	Estonia (EST)	2	1	2	5
19	Denmark (DEN)	2	0	2	4
20	Great Britain (GBR)	1	7	12	20
21	South Africa (RSA)	1	3	0	4
22	Sweden (SWE)	1	1	4	6
23	Greece (GRE)	1	0	0	1
24	Turkey (TUR)	0	2	2	4
25	Hungary (HUN)	0	2	0	2
25	Malaysia (MAS)	0	2	0	2
25	Portugal (POR)	0	2	0	2
28	Finland (FIN)	0	1	1	2
29	Iceland (ISL)	0	1	0	1
29	Lithuania (LTU)	0	1	0	1
29	Switzerland (SUI)	0	1	0	1
32	Belgium (BEL)	0	0	2	2
33	Croatia (CRO)	0	0	1	1
33	Israel (ISR)	0	0	1	1
33	Latvia (LAT)	0	0	1	1
33	Poland (POL)	0	0	1	1
33	Slovenia (SLO)	0	0	1	1
33	Spain (ESP)	0	0	1	1
Totals (38 entries)		126	125	127	378

Preceded by 1989 XVI; Christchurch, New Zealand	1993 Summer Deaflympics; XVII; Sofia, Bulgaria	Succeeded by 1997 XVIII; Copenhagen, Denmark
