= Curling at the 2019 Winter Deaflympics =

- Venue: Circola Sciatori
- Dates: 11–20 December

The curling competition at the 2019 Winter Deaflympics was held between 11 and 20 December 2019 at the Circolo Sciatori, Madesimo. The ICSD committee decided to increase the maximum number of teams for both genders from ten to twelve. This was the first curling competition to be held as a part of multi-sport event in Italy since the country last hosted the curling event as a part of the 2013 Winter Universiade.

== Competition schedule ==
Curling competition started the day before the 2019 Winter Deaflympics opening ceremony and finished on the last day of the games, meaning the sport was the only one to have a competition every day of the games.

RR	Round robin	SF	Semifinals	B	3rd place play-off	F	Final

Date Event	Thu 5	Fri 6	Sat 7	Sun 8	Mon 9	Tue 10	Wed 11	Thu 12	Fri 13	Sat 14	Sun 15	Mon 16	Tue 17	Wed 18	Thu 19	Fri 20	Fri 20
Men's event							RR	RR	RR	RR	RR	RR	RR	RR	SF	B	F
Women's event							RR	RR	RR	RR	RR	RR	RR	RR	SF	B	F

== Participating nations ==
Men and women each representing 12 different nations are scheduled to take part in the curling competition.

=== Men ===
==== Round-robin ====
Key
Teams to playoffs

Country	Skip	W	L
China	Meng Yifei	11	0
Russia	Alexsandr Pytkov	9	2
Finland	Veli-Dekka Vahala	8	3
Poland	Tomasz Gumiński	6	5
South Korea	Youn Soon Young	6	5
Hungary	Gyula Flank	6	5
Ukraine	Vadin Marchenko	6	5
United States	Hermann Fuechtmann	5	6
Canada	Craig Waldbillig	5	6
Japan	Araya Junichi	2	9
Switzerland	Christoph Sidler	2	9
Italy	Maurizio Bartolomeo	0	11

==== Knockout ====
Semifinals
19 December
China	7
Poland	2
19 December
Russia	10
Finland	2

Gold medal
20 December
China	6
Russia	5
Bronze medal
20 December
Finland	11
Poland	3

=== Women ===
==== Round-robin ====
Key
Teams to playoffs

Country	Skip	W	L
China	Wang Mingming	5	1
South Korea	Kim Ji Su	4	2
Russia	Svetlana Tsedik	3	3
Croatia	Marijana Bozic	3	3
Canada	Holly Jamieson	3	3
Hungary	Zsuzsanna Pinter	2	4
Ukraine	Kateryna Yakimets	1	5

==== Knockout ====
Semifinals
19 December
Croatia	7
China	8
19 December
Russia	9
South Korea	4

Gold medal
20 December
China	9
Russia	8
Bronze medal
20 December
Croatia	7
South Korea	13

== Medal table ==
Rank	Nation	Gold	Silver	Bronze	Total
1	China (CHN)	2	0	0	2
2	Russia (RUS)	0	2	0	2
3	Finland (FIN)	0	0	1	1
3	South Korea (KOR)	0	0	1	1
Totals (4 entries)		2	2	2	6

== Medal summary ==
Event	Gold	Silver	Bronze
Men's tournament	China; An Shuo; Dong Yongkang; Meng Yifei; Wang Xiaoshuai; Yang Yan Chao	Russia; Andrei Anishcenko; Oleg Darchiev; Oleg Khoroshkov; Alexander Pyatkov; Vladimir Ulianov	Finland; Jari Hakkinen; Risto Lehtinen; Veikko Parikka; Timo Toivonen; Veli-Pekka Vahala
Women's tournament	China; Li Hong; Wang Ming Ming; Yang Xue; Yin Yu; Zhao Lingyan	Russia; Olga Yaroslavtceva; Anastasia Kozyrina; Svetlana Orlova; Elena Shagieva; Svetlana Tsedik	South Korea; Choi Jeyun; Kim Jisu; Kwon Yeji; Lee Sujeong; Oh Hyebeen
