= Ice hockey at the Deaflympics =

Ice hockey has been contested as a sport in the Winter Deaflympics since 1975. In the Winter Deaflympic history, ice hockey has been contested only for men on 8 occasions (1975, 1991, 1995, 1999, 2003, 2007, 2015 and 2019).

In the inaugural men's ice hockey tournament, only Canada and United States were eligible to compete way back in 1975.

Canada and United States have been the most successful nations as they have won the most number of medals in the sporting event since 1975. Both US and Canada are the only teams to win medals in the ice hockey competitions they have competed.

== Medal winners ==
Games	Gold	Silver	Bronze
1975	Canada	United States	not awarded
1991	Soviet Union	United States	Canada
1995	United States	Canada	Russia
1999	Canada	United States	Finland
2003	Canada	Russia	United States
2007	United States	Canada	Russia
2015	Russia	Canada	United States
2019	United States	Canada	Russia

== Medal table ==
Rank	Nation	Gold	Silver	Bronze	Total
1	Canada	3	4	1	8
2	United States	3	3	2	8
3	Russia	1	1	3	5
4	Soviet Union	1	0	0	1
5	Finland	0	0	1	1
Totals (5 entries)		8	8	7	23
