= Uzbekistan at the Deaflympics =

- IPC code: UZB
- NPC: Sport Federation of the Deaf of Uzbekistan
- Medals: Gold 0 Silver 0 Bronze 1 Total 1

Summer appearances
- 1997; 2001; 2005; 2009; 2013; 2017; 2021

Other related appearances
- Soviet Union (1957–1991)

Uzbekistan has been participating at the Deaflympics since 1997. Uzbekistan won its first Deaflympic medal in the 2009 Summer Deaflympics for Taekwondo, which is also their only medal in Deaflympics history.

== Medals ==
=== Medals by Summer Games ===
Games	Athletes	Gold	Silver	Bronze	Total	Rank
(Denmark) 1997 Copenhagen	2	0	0	0	0	-
(Italy) 2001 Rome	43	0	0	0	0	-
(Australia) 2005 Melbourne	Did not participate					
(Chinese Taipei) 2009 Taipei	14	0	0	1	1	47
(Bulgaria) 2013 Sofia	19	0	0	0	0	-
(Turkey) 2017 Samsun	9	0	0	0	0	-
(Brazil) 2021 Caxias do Sul	?	0	0	0	0	-
(Japan) 2025 Tokyo	?	0	0	0	0	-
Total		0	0	1	1	71

=== Medals by Winter Games ===
Games	Athletes	Gold	Silver	Bronze	Total	Rank
(Slovakia) 2011 Vysoké Tatry	Games Cancelled					
(Russia) 2015 Khanty-Mansiysk	Did not participate					
(Italy) 2019 Valtellina-Valchiavenna	6	0	0	0	0	-
Total		0	0	0	0	-

== See also ==
- Deafness in Uzbekistan
