= Lyubov Misharina =

Russian cross-country skier

Personal information
- Full name: Lyubov Ivanovna Misharina
- Nationality: Russian
- Born: 22 April 1986 (age 40) Syktyvkar, Russia
- Years active: 1999 – present
- Spouse: Vladimir Mayorov

Sport
- Country: Russia
- Sport: cross-country skiing
Medal record
Women's cross-country skiing
Representing Russia
Event / 1st / 2nd / 3rd; Deaflympics / 3 / 9 / 0
Winter Deaflympics
Gold medal – first place	Salt Lake 2007	team sprint classic
Gold medal – first place	Sondrio 2019	sprint classic
Gold medal – first place	Sondrio 2019	team sprint freestyle
Silver medal – second place	Salt Lake 2007	15km double pursuit
Silver medal – second place	Salt Lake 2007	sprint free
Silver medal – second place	Salt Lake 2007	10km mass start
Silver medal – second place	Khanty-Mansiysk 2015	5km skiathlon
Silver medal – second place	Khanty-Mansiysk 2015	sprint free
Silver medal – second place	Khanty-Mansiysk 2015	10km mass start
Silver medal – second place	Sondrio 2019	6km pursuit free
Silver medal – second place	Sondrio 2019	3km individual classic
Silver medal – second place	Sondrio 2019	5km free

Lyubov Ivanovna Misharina (also spelt as Liubov, born 22 April 1986) is a Russian deaf cross-country skier. She married fellow cross-country skier Vladimir Mayorov after dating each other in 2010.

== Career ==
She made her debut appearance at the Winter Deaflympics representing Russia during the 2007 Winter Deaflympics and claimed four medals including a gold. She continued her medal success in the following Winter Deaflympics in 2015 which was held in her home country Russia claiming three silver medals.

She also represented Russia at the 2019 Winter Deaflympics and extended her Deaflympic career medal success clinching five medals including gold medals in mixed team sprint freestyle and sprint classic events.

== Awards ==
- In the 2020 edition of the national sports award Overcoming, in the nomination Sportswoman of the Year
