= Ice hockey at the 2019 Winter Deaflympics =

- Venue: Sport Centre Valchiavenna
- Location: Province of Sondrio, Italy
- Dates: 13–21 December
- Nations: 5

Medalists
| gold medal | United States |
| silver medal | Canada |
| bronze medal | Russia |

The ice hockey competition was one of the events held at the 2019 Winter Deaflympics.

The competition consisted of the men's tournament only. The original idea was to also organise a women's ice hockey tournament, but the International Committee of Sports for the Deaf cancelled the event due to the low number of countries registered on it.

== Participating nations ==
- Canada
- Finland
- Kazakhstan
- Russia
- United States

== Preliminary round ==
| Pos | Team | Pld | W | OTW | OTL | L | GF | GA | GD | Pts | Qualification |
|---|---|---|---|---|---|---|---|---|---|---|---|
| 1 | Canada | 4 | 4 | 0 | 0 | 0 | 30 | 3 | +27 | 12 | Gold medal game |
| 2 | United States | 4 | 3 | 0 | 0 | 1 | 28 | 9 | +19 | 9 | Gold medal game |
| 3 | Russia | 4 | 2 | 0 | 0 | 2 | 22 | 11 | +11 | 6 | Bronze medal game |
| 4 | Finland | 4 | 1 | 0 | 0 | 3 | 24 | 18 | +6 | 3 | Bronze medal game |
| 5 | Kazakhstan | 4 | 0 | 0 | 0 | 4 | 1 | 64 | −63 | 0 | |

Source: powerhockey.info

All times are local (UTC+1).

| 13 December 2019; 15:00 | Russia | 1–3 (1–2, 0–1, 0–0) | Canada | Sport Centre Valchiavenna |

Game reference
| 35 min | Penalties | 6 min |
| 14 | Shots | 44 |

| 13 December 2019; 19:00 | Finland | 2–6 (1–1, 0–2, 1–3) | United States | Sport Centre Valchiavenna |

Game reference
| 10 min | Penalties | 28 min |
| 14 | Shots | 45 |

| 14 December 2019; 19:00 | Kazakhstan | 0–12 (0–5, 0–1, 0–6) | Russia | Sport Centre Valchiavenna |

Game reference
| 4 min | Penalties | 6 min |
| 8 | Shots | 41 |

| 15 December 2019; 15:00 | Canada | 5–1 (2–1, 1–0, 2–0) | Finland | Sport Centre Valchiavenna |

Game reference
| 16 min | Penalties | 16 min |
| 32 | Shots | 17 |

| 15 December 2019; 19:00 | United States | 14–0 (11–0, 3–0, 0–0) | Kazakhstan | Sport Centre Valchiavenna |

Game reference
| 8 min | Penalties | 14 min |
| 32 | Shots | 6 |

| 17 December 2019; 13:00 | Russia | 3–7 (0–0, 3–5, 0–2) | United States | Sport Centre Valchiavenna |

Game reference
| 16 min | Penalties | 14 min |
| 25 | Shots | 47 |

| 18 December 2019; 15:00 | Finland | 1–6 (0–2, 1–3, 0–1) | Russia | Sport Centre Valchiavenna |

Game reference
| 14 min | Penalties | 10 min |
| 25 | Shots | 33 |

| 18 December 2019; 19:00 | Canada | 18–0 (5–0, 6–0, 7–0) | Kazakhstan | Sport Centre Valchiavenna |

Game reference
| 4 min | Penalties | 6 min |
| 56 | Shots | 7 |

| 19 December 2019; 19:00 | Kazakhstan | 1–20 (0–9, 1–7, 0–4) | Finland | Sport Centre Valchiavenna |

Game reference
| 24 min | Penalties | 6 min |
| 9 | Shots | 42 |

| 20 December 2019; 15:00 | United States | 1–4 (0–2, 1–1, 0–1) | Canada | Sport Centre Valchiavenna |

Game reference
| 14 min | Penalties | 20 min |
| 23 | Shots | 31 |

== Bronze medal game ==
| 21 December 2019; 11:00 | Russia | 5–1 (3–0, 1–0, 1–1) | Finland | Sport Centre Valchiavenna |

Game reference
| 12 min | Penalties | 12 min |
| 32 | Shots | 22 |

== Gold medal game ==
| 21 December 2019; 15:00 | Canada | 3–7 (1–0, 0–4, 2–3) | United States | Sport Centre Valchiavenna |

Game reference
| 34 min | Penalties | 8 min |
| 30 | Shots | 37 |

== Medalists ==
| Event | Gold | Silver | Bronze |
|---|---|---|---|
| Men's team | United States; Curran Allison; Tyler Balcerak; Troy Benson; Christian Buczek; Max Finley; Henry Fusco; Miles Gates; Garrett Gintoli; Peter Gintoli; William Holtzer; Samuel Holzrichter; Scott Humes; Grant Isenbarger; Ryne Krueger; Daniel Kurchena; Anders Lindgren; Jeffrey Mansfield; Trevor Mchugh; Tomas Oricchio; Luke Peinado; Jake Schlereth; Max Stephens; Derek Struwing | Canada; Ryan Chramtchenko; Bryce Cook; Jack Des Roches; Christopher Garbacz; Jalen Harris; Andrew Hughes; Owen Hunter; John Kyte; Sean Kyte; Thomas Kyte; Cole Laing; Massimo Luciani; Cody Mcintyre; Jesse Mcintyre; Casey O'Brien; Callum Paterson; Marc Pelletier; Matthew Sheffield; Dimitrios Theofilaktidis; Brent Walters | Russia; Alexei Baburkin; Daniil Balakin; Dmitrii Bogdan; Roman Chernov; Mikhail Fetisov; Rustam Gafurbaev; Aleksei Iakimuk; Alexey Ikonnikov; Leonid Inozemtsev; Akim Kalinin; Nikita Kamkin; Vyacheslav Kazantsev; Mikhail Kondratev; Sergei Kunnikov; Roman Lukianov; Vadim Mazurskii; Vitalii Mokhov; Sergey Osipov; Andrei Rodenkov; Ilya Shevtsov; Alexander Solovyev; Vitaly Tikhonov; Denis Zotov |
