= Tatyana Gorbunova =

Russian cross-country skier

Personal information
- Full name: Tatyana Yuryevna Gorbunova
- Nationality: Russian
- Born: 25 January 1995 (age 31)

Sport
- Country: Russia
- Sport: cross-country skiing
Medal record
Women's cross-country skiing
Representing Russia
Winter Deaflympics
Bronze medal – third place	Sondrio 2019	3km individual classic
Bronze medal – third place	Sondrio 2019	sprint classic

Tatyana Yuryevna Gorbunova (born 25 January 1995) is a Russian deaf cross-country skier.

== Career ==
She made her debut appearance at the Winter Deaflympics representing Russia during the 2015 Winter Deaflympics but went medalless.

She also represented Russia at the 2019 Winter Deaflympics and claimed two bronze medals in women's 3km individual classic and sprint classic events.
