= Anna Fedulova =

Russian cross-country skier (born 1978)

Personal information
- Nationality: Russian
- Born: 19 July 1978 (age 47)
- Years active: 1999 – present

Sport
- Country: Russia
- Sport: cross-country skiing
Medal record
Women's cross-country skiing
Representing Russia
Event / 1st / 2nd / 3rd; Deaflympics / 13 / 5 / 0
Winter Deaflympics
| Gold medal – first place | Davos 1999 | 3×5km relay |
| Gold medal – first place | Sundsvall 2003 | 3×5km relay |
| Gold medal – first place | Sundsvall 2003 | 5km |
| Gold medal – first place | Salt Lake 2007 | 15km double pursuit |
| Gold medal – first place | Salt Lake 2007 | sprint free |
| Gold medal – first place | Salt Lake 2007 | 10km mass start |
| Gold medal – first place | Salt Lake 2007 | team sprint classic |
| Gold medal – first place | Khanty-Mansiysk 2015 | 5km skiathlon |
| Gold medal – first place | Khanty-Mansiysk 2015 | sprint free |
| Gold medal – first place | Khanty-Mansiysk 2015 | 10km mass start |
| Gold medal – first place | Sondrio 2019 | 5km free technique |
| Gold medal – first place | Sondrio 2019 | 3km individual |
| Gold medal – first place | Sondrio 2019 | 3.3km pursuit |
| Silver medal – second place | Davos 1999 | 10km |
| Silver medal – second place | Davos 1999 | 10km double pursuit |
| Silver medal – second place | Sundsvall 2003 | 10km double pursuit |
| Silver medal – second place | Sundsvall 2003 | 15km |
| Silver medal – second place | Sondrio 2019 | sprint classic |

Anna Yuryevna Fedulova (born 19 July 1978) is a Russian deaf cross-country skier. She made her maiden appearance at the Deaflympics representing Russia at the 1999 Winter Deaflympics. During the 2019 Winter Deaflympics, She surpassed Tone Tangen Myrvoll's record to become the most successful cross-country skier in Deaflympics history claiming a medal tally of 18 including 13 gold medals. She made her fifth appearance at the Deaflympics by representing Russia at the 2019 Winter Deaflympics.
