= Cecilia Hanhikoski =

Finnish snowboarder and futsal player

Personal information
- Full name: Cecilia Emma Hanhikoski
- Nationality: Finnish
- Born: September 12, 1989 (age 36)

Sport
- Country: Finland
- Sport: snowboarding
Medal record
Women's snowboarding
Representing Finland
Winter Deaflympics
Gold medal – first place	Khanty-Mansiyst 2015	parallel slalom
Silver medal – second place	Salt Lake 2007	parallel giant slalom
Silver medal – second place	Sondrio 2019	parallel giant slalom
Silver medal – second place	Sondrio 2019	parallel slalom
Silver medal – second place	Khanty-Mansiyst 2015	giant slalom
Bronze medal – third place	Salt Lake 2007	parallel slalom

Cecilia Emma Hanhikoski (born 12 September 1989) is a Finnish deaf snowboarder and futsal player. She has represented Finland at the Deaflympics in 2007, 2015 and 2019. Cecilia has won a total of 6 medals at the Winter Deaflympics including a gold medal.

She also served as the former President of the World Federation of the Deaf Youth Section (WFDYS) from 2015 to 2019.
