= Rea Hraski =

Croatian alpine skier (born 1992)

Personal information
- Nationality: Croatian
- Born: 22 March 1992 (age 34)

Sport
- Country: Croatia
Medal record
Representing Croatia
Women's Alpine skiing
Deaflympics
Bronze medal – third place	Sondrio 2019	Downhill
Bronze medal – third place	Sondrio 2019	Super-G
Bronze medal – third place	Salt Lake 2007	Slalom

Rea Hraski (born 22 March 1992) is a Croatian female alpine skier. She represented Croatia at the 2007 Winter Deaflympics, the 2015 Winter Deaflympics and the 2019 Winter Deaflympics.

Rea claimed the bronze medal in the women's slalom event during the 2007 Winter Deaflympics, where she was placed at third position just behind Czech Republic's leading alpine skier Tereza Kmochová. In 2013, she was nominated for the ICSD Deaf Sportswoman of the Year award.

In 2019, she won the bronze medal in both the women's downhill and women's Super-G events at the 2019 Winter Deaflympics.
