= Petra Kurková =

Czech alpine skier

Personal information
- Nationality: Czech
- Born: 2 August 1973 (age 52) Ostrava, Czechoslovakia
- Years active: 1999 – 2007

Sport
- Country: Czech Republic
- Sport: alpine skiing
Medal record
Women's Alpine skiing
Representing Czech Republic
Event / 1st / 2nd / 3rd; Deaflympics / 8 / 2 / 2
Winter Deaflympics
Gold medal – first place	Davos 1999	Downhill
Gold medal – first place	Davos 1999	Giant slalom
Gold medal – first place	Davos 1999	Slalom
Gold medal – first place	Davos 1999	Super-G
Gold medal – first place	Sundsvall 2003	Parallel slalom
Gold medal – first place	Sundsvall 2003	Slalom
Gold medal – first place	Salt Lake 2007	Alpine combined
Gold medal – first place	Salt Lake 2007	Slalom
Silver medal – second place	Sundsvall 2003	Downhill
Silver medal – second place	Salt Lake 2007	Super-G
Bronze medal – third place	Sundsvall 2003	Giant slalom
Bronze medal – third place	Salt Lake 2007	Downhill

Petra Kurková (born 2 August 1973) is a former Czech female deaf alpine skier. She represented Czech Republic at the Deaflympics in 1999, 2003 and 2007 claiming 12 medals in her Deaflympic career including 8 gold medals. Petra Kurkova also received a scholarship of Fulbright-Masaryk Fellowship to study at the Valdosta State University after claiming four gold medals at the 1999 Winter Deaflympics. She was once considered as one of the leading deaf female skiers in the world after recording a medal tally of 12 during her Deaflympic career which spanned from 1999 to 2007.

== Career ==
Petra made her Deaflympic debut during the 1999 Winter Deaflympics and set milestones after claiming four gold medals in the women's downhill, giant slalom, slalom and Super-G events. With clinching four gold medals at the Davos Deaflympics, she became the first individual athlete either male or female to claim four gold medals in a single edition of the Winter Deaflympics.

Petra Kurkova also bettered the gold medal achievements when compared to male counterparts mainly in the slalom and giant slalom events during the 1999 Winter Deaflympics. After her achievements at her first Deaflympic event, she was awarded the ICSD Deaf Sportswoman of the Year award in 1999.

She also continued her medal hunt at the 2003 Winter Deaflympics as she claimed gold medals in the women's parallel slalom and slalom events, silver medal in the downhill category and a bronze medal in the women's giant slalom event. Petra was also nominated for the ICSD Deaf Sportswoman of the Year award in 2000 and 2003.
