= Cross-country skiing at the 2019 Winter Deaflympics =

- Location: Province of Sondrio, Italy
- Dates: 13–18 December

Cross-country skiing was one of the competitions held at the 2019 Winter Deaflympics.

== Medal table ==
Rank	Nation	Gold	Silver	Bronze	Total
1	Russia (RUS)	6	6	5	17
2	Ukraine (UKR)	3	3	3	9
3	China (CHN)	0	0	1	1
Totals (3 entries)		9	9	9	27

== Medal summary ==
=== Men ===
Event	Gold	Silver	Bronze
10 km freestyle	Dmytro Mazhaiev; Ukraine	Vladimir Mayorov; Russia	Maksim Kovalev; Russia
Sprint classical	Vladimir Mayorov; Russia	Pavlo Mandziuk; Ukraine	Andrey Dubovskikh; Russia
5 km classical	Dmytro Mazhaiev; Ukraine	Andriy Andriyishyn; Ukraine	Vladimir Mayorov; Russia
10 km pursuit freestyle	Dmytro Mazhaiev; Ukraine	Roman Chirkov; Russia	Ruslan Denysenko; Ukraine

=== Women ===
Event	Gold	Silver	Bronze
5 km freestyle	Anna Fedulova; Russia	Lyubov Misharina; Russia	Yelizaveta Noprienko; Ukraine
Sprint classical	Lyubov Misharina; Russia	Anna Fedulova; Russia	Tatyana Gorbunova; Russia
3 km classical	Anna Fedulova; Russia	Lyubov Misharina; Russia	Tatyana Gorbunova; Russia
6 km pursuit freestyle	Anna Fedulova; Russia	Lyubov Misharina; Russia	Yelizaveta Noprienko; Ukraine

=== Mixed ===
Event	Gold	Silver	Bronze
Team sprint freestyle	Russia; Lyubov Misharina; Sergey Ermilov	Ukraine; Anastasiia Lavryk; Volodymyr Pyshniak	China; Zhang Buchi; Wang Liguo
