= Veronika Grygarová =

Czech alpine skier (born 1991)

Personal information
- Nationality: Czech
- Born: 12 April 1991 (age 35)

Sport
- Country: Czech Republic
- Sport: alpine skiing
Medal record
Women's Alpine skiing
Representing Czech Republic
Deaflympics
Silver medal – second place	Khanty-Mansiysk 2015	Downhill

Veronika Grygarová (born 12 April 1991) is a Czech deaf female alpine skier. She represented Czech Republic at the Deaflympics in 2007 and 2015.

She made her Deaflympic debut at the 2007 Winter Deaflympics and competed in the women's giant slalom, slalom and Super-G events. Veronika also went onto participate at the 2015 Winter Deaflympics and competed in the women's slalom, giant slalom, Super-G, super combined and downhill events. She claimed her only medal in her Deaflympic career as she claimed a silver medal in the downhill category while the gold medal was claimed by her compatriot, Tereza Kmochová in the relevant event.
