= Kock (disambiguation) =

Kock is a town in eastern Poland

Kock may also refer to:

- Gmina Kock, urban/rural district in Poland
- Kock pouch
- Kock (surname)

== See also ==
- Melissa Köck
