= Alpine skiing at the 2019 Winter Deaflympics =

- Venue: Valfurva
- Dates: 13–19 December

Alpine skiing at the 2019 Winter Deaflympics was held at the Valfurva from 13 to 19 December 2019.

== Medal table ==
* Host nation (Italy)

Rank	Nation	Gold	Silver	Bronze	Total
1	Italy (ITA)*	5	0	0	5
2	Russia (RUS)	4	3	1	8
3	Czech Republic (CZE)	1	4	1	6
4	France (FRA)	0	3	2	5
5	Austria (AUT)	0	0	4	4
6	Croatia (CRO)	0	0	2	2
Totals (6 entries)		10	10	10	30

== Medal summary ==
=== Men ===
Event	Gold	Silver	Bronze
Downhill	Giacomo Pierbon; Italy	Pavel Kazakov; Russia	Lukas Käfer; Austria
Super-G	Giacomo Pierbon; Italy	Nicolas Sarremejane; France	Thomas Luxcey; France
Giant slalom	Giacomo Pierbon; Italy	Nicolas Sarremejane; France	Jiří Hartig; Czech Republic
Slalom	Giacomo Pierbon; Italy	Nicolas Sarremejane; France	Pavel Kazakov; Russia
Alpine combined	Giacomo Pierbon; Italy	Pavel Kazakov; Russia	Nicolas Sarremejane; France

=== Women ===
Event	Gold	Silver	Bronze
Downhill	Elena Yakovishina; Russia	Tereza Kmochová; Czech Republic	Rea Hraski; Croatia
Super-G	Elena Yakovishina; Russia	Tereza Kmochová; Czech Republic	Rea Hraski; Croatia
Giant slalom	Tereza Kmochová; Czech Republic	Elena Yakovishina; Russia	Melissa Kock; Austria
Slalom	Elena Yakovishina; Russia	Tereza Kmochová; Czech Republic	Melissa Kock; Austria
Alpine combined	Elena Yakovishina; Russia	Tereza Kmochová; Czech Republic	Melissa Kock; Austria
