= Anna Surmilina =

Russian snowboarder (born 1998)

Personal information
- Nationality: Russian
- Born: 9 August 1998 (age 27)

Sport
- Country: Russia
- Sport: snowboarding
Medal record
Women's snowboarding
Representing Russia
Winter Deaflympics
Gold medal – first place	Sondrio 2019	parallel giant slalom
Gold medal – first place	Sondrio 2019	parallel slalom
Bronze medal – third place	Khanty-Mansiyst 2015	giant slalom
Bronze medal – third place	Khanty-Mansiyst 2015	parallel slalom

Anna Pavlovna Surmilina (born 9 August 1998) is a Russian deaf snowboarder.

She made her Deaflympic debut at the 2015 Winter Deaflympics and claimed two bronze medals in women's snowboarding events.

She also represented Russia at the 2019 Winter Deaflympics and claimed gold medals in women's parallel giant slalom and parallel slalom events.
