= Giacomo Pierbon =

Italian alpine skier (born 1987)

Personal information
- Nationality: Italian
- Born: 2 July 1987 (age 38)

Sport
- Country: Italy
- Sport: alpine skiing
Medal record
Men's alpine skiing
Representing Italy
Event / 1st / 2nd / 3rd; Deaflympics / 8 / 2 / 0
Deaflympics
Gold medal – first place	Khanty-Mansiysk 2015	Super combined
Gold medal – first place	Khanty-Mansiysk 2015	Super-G
Gold medal – first place	Khanty-Mansiysk 2015	Slalom
Gold medal – first place	Province of Sondrio 2019	Downhill
Gold medal – first place	Province of Sondrio 2019	Super-G
Gold medal – first place	Province of Sondrio 2019	Giant slalom
Gold medal – first place	Province of Sondrio 2019	Slalom
Gold medal – first place	Province of Sondrio 2019	Alpine combined
Silver medal – second place	Khanty-Mansiysk 2015	Downhill
Silver medal – second place	Khanty-Mansiysk 2015	Giant slalom

Giacomo Pierbon (born 2 July 1987) is an Italian alpine skier.

== Career ==
He made his Deaflympic debut representing Italy at the 2015 Winter Deaflympics. He was successful on his maiden appearance claiming a total of five medals including three gold medals in men's super combined, Super-G and slalom events. He also represented Italy at the 2019 Winter Deaflympics which is coincidentally held in his home nation Italy and managed to claim five gold medals in men's alpine skiing categories.
