= Russia at the Deaflympics =

- IPC code: RUS
- NPC: Russian Committee of Deaf Sports
- Website: www.deafsport.ru
- Medals Ranked 2nd: Gold 273 Silver 226 Bronze 238 Total 737

Summer appearances
- 1924; 1928; 1931; 1935; 1939; 1949; 1953; 1957; 1961; 1965; 1969; 1973; 1977; 1981; 1985; 1989; 1993; 1997; 2001; 2005; 2009; 2013; 2017; 2021

Winter appearances
- 1995; 1999; 2003; 2007; 2015; 2019; 2023

Other related appearances
- Soviet Union (1957–1991)

Russia participated at the Deaflympics after making its debut in 1993, until it was banned in 2022. Russia is just behind United States for winning the most medals in Deaflympics history. In the 2017 Summer Deaflympics held in Turkey, Russia was the medal topper with a record haul of 199 medals. After the 2022 Russian invasion of Ukraine, the International Committee of Sports for the Deaf (ICSD) banned athletes from Russia from that year's Deaflympics in Caxias do Sul, Brazil.

Russia has also been competing at the Winter Deaflympics from 1995.

== Medal tallies ==
=== Summer Deaflympics ===
Event	Gold	Silver	Bronze	Total
1993	16	10	18	44
1997	14	15	13	42
2001	13	18	18	49
2005	13	17	26	56
2009	29	41	29	99
2013	67	52	58	177
2017	85	53	61	199

=== Winter Deaflympics ===
Event	Gold	Silver	Bronze	Total
1995	4	1	4	9
1999	4	4	2	10
2003	6	6	6	18
2007	9	5	4	18
2015	12	6	12	30
2019	18	18	14	50
