= Czech Republic at the 2019 Winter Deaflympics =

- Flag of the Czech Republic
- IPC code: CZE

in Province of Sondrio, Italy 12 December 2019 – 21 December 2019
- Medals Ranked 4th: Gold 2 Silver 4 Bronze 1 Total 7

Winter Deaflympics appearances (overview)
- 1995; 1999; 2003; 2007; 2015; 2019; 2023

The Czech Republic competed at the 2019 Winter Deaflympics held between 12 and 21 December 2019 in Province of Sondrio in Northern Italy. Most medals were won in alpine skiing and the country finished in 4th place with a total of two gold medals, four silver medals and one bronze medal.

== Medalists ==
Medal	Name	Sport	Event	Date
Gold	Tomáš Pazdera	Snowboarding	Men's snowboard cross	16 December
Gold	Tereza Kmochová	Alpine skiing	Women's giant slalom	17 December
Silver	Tereza Kmochová	Alpine skiing	Women's downhill	13 December
Silver	Tereza Kmochová	Alpine skiing	Women's alpine combined	14 December
Silver	Tereza Kmochová	Alpine skiing	Women's Super-G	15 December
Silver	Tereza Kmochová	Alpine skiing	Women's slalom	16 December
Bronze	Jiří Hartig	Alpine skiing	Men's giant slalom	17 December

== Alpine skiing ==
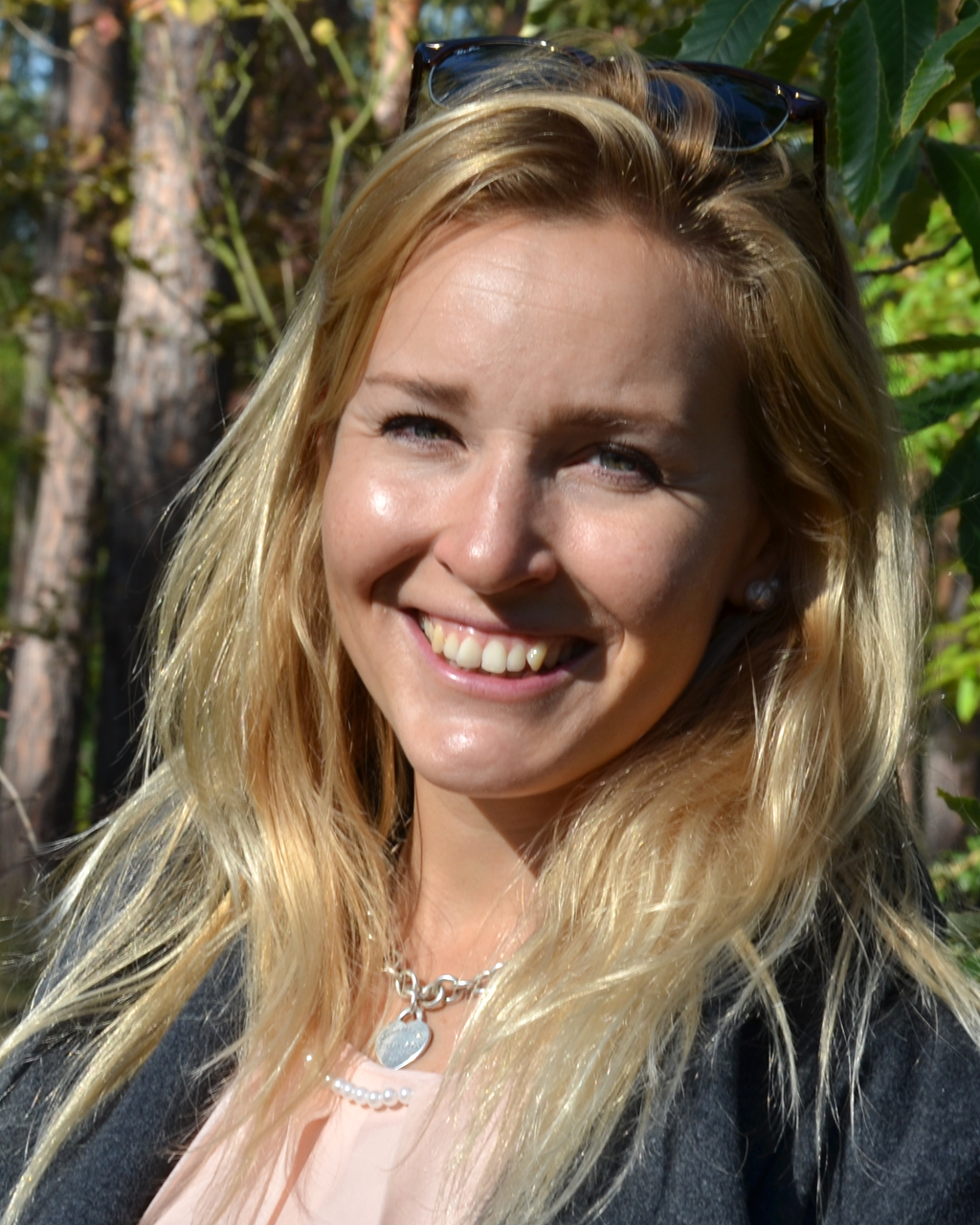
Tereza Kmochová (2018)

Jiří Hartig won the bronze medal in the men's giant slalom event.

Tereza Kmochová won the gold medal in the women's giant slalom event and the silver medals in the four other women's alpine skiing events: the women's downhill event, the women's slalom event, the women's alpine combined event and the women's Super-G event.

== Snowboarding ==
Tomáš Pazdera won the gold medal in the men's snowboard cross event.
