= Israel at the 2019 Winter Deaflympics =

- Flag of Israel
- IPC code: ISR

in Province of Sondrio, Italy 12 December 2019 – 21 December 2019
- Medals Ranked 7th: Gold 1 Silver 0 Bronze 0 Total 1

Winter Deaflympics appearances (overview)
- 1949; 1953; 1955; 1959; 1963; 1967; 1971; 1975; 1979; 1983; 1987; 1991; 1995; 1999; 2003; 2007; 2015; 2019; 2023

Israel competed at the 2019 Winter Deaflympics held between 12 and 21 December 2019 in Province of Sondrio in Northern Italy. The country won one gold medal and the country finished in 7th place in the medal table.

== Medalists ==
Medal	Name	Sport	Event	Date
Gold	Yehuda Gruenfeld	Chess	Men Blitz	13 December

== Chess ==
Yehuda Gruenfeld won the gold medal in the men's blitz tournament.
