= Russia at the 2019 Winter Deaflympics =

- Flag of Russia
- IPC code: RUS

in Province of Sondrio, Italy 12 December 2019 – 21 December 2019
- Medals Ranked 1st: Gold 18 Silver 18 Bronze 14 Total 50

Winter Deaflympics appearances (overview)
- 1995; 1999; 2003; 2007; 2015; 2019; 2023

Russia competed at the 2019 Winter Deaflympics held between 12 and 21 December 2019 in Province of Sondrio in Northern Italy. Russian competitors won medals in each of the sports contested at the games and the country finished in 1st place in the medal table.

== Medalists ==
Medal	Name	Sport	Event	Date
Gold	Anna Fedulova	Cross-country skiing	Women's 5 km free technique	13 December
Gold	Yulia Turkeeva	Chess	Women's blitz tournament	13 December
Gold	Elena Yakovishina	Alpine skiing	Women's downhill	13 December
Gold	Aleksei Kazantsev	Snowboarding	Men's parallel giant slalom	13 December
Gold	Anna Surmilina	Snowboarding	Women's parallel giant slalom	13 December
Gold	Vladmir Mayorov	Cross-country skiing	Men's sprint classic	14 December
Gold	Lyubov Misharina	Cross-country skiing	Women's sprint classic	14 December
Gold	Aleksei Kazantsev	Snowboarding	Men's parallel slalom	14 December
Gold	Anna Surmilina	Snowboarding	Women's parallel slalom	14 December
Gold	Elena Yakovishina	Alpine skiing	Women's alpine combined	14 December
Gold	Elena Yakovishina	Alpine skiing	Women's Super-G	15 December
Gold	Anna Fedulova	Cross-country skiing	Women's 3 km individual	16 December
Gold	Margarita Noskova	Snowboarding	Women's snowboard cross	16 December
Gold	Anna Fedulova	Cross-country skiing	Women's 3.3 km pursuit	17 December
Gold	Lyubov Misharina; Sergey Ermilov	Cross-country skiing	Team sprint free technique	18 December
Gold	Elena Yakovishina	Alpine skiing	Women's slalom	18 December
Gold	Nikita Goryachev	Snowboarding	Men's big air	19 December
Gold	Margarita Noskova	Snowboarding	Women's big air	19 December
Silver	Vladimir Mayorov	Cross-country skiing	Men's 10 km free technique	13 December
Silver	Lyubov Misharina	Cross-country skiing	Women's 5 km free technique	13 December
Silver	Pavel Kazakov	Alpine skiing	Men's downhill	13 December
Silver	Petr Lebedev	Snowboarding	Men's parallel giant slalom	13 December
Silver	Anna Fedulova	Cross-country skiing	Women's sprint classic	14 December
Silver	Pavel Kazakov	Alpine skiing	Men's alpine combined	14 December
Silver	Danil Istomin	Snowboarding	Men's parallel slalom	14 December
Silver	Lyubov Misharina	Cross-country skiing	Women's 3 km individual	16 December
Silver	Alexey Ignatenko	Snowboarding	Men's snowboard cross	16 December
Silver	Roman Chirkov	Cross-country skiing	Men's 10 km pursuit	17 December
Silver	Lyubov Misharina	Cross-country skiing	Women's 3.3 km pursuit	17 December
Silver	Elena Yakovishina	Alpine skiing	Women's giant slalom	17 December
Silver	Stanislav Sokolov	Snowboarding	Men's slopestyle	18 December
Silver	Margarita Noskova	Snowboarding	Women's slopestyle	18 December
Silver	Russia	Curling	Men's tournament	20 December
Silver	Russia	Curling	Women's tournament	20 December
Silver	Natalia Kudriavtseva; Yulia Turkeeva; Olga Lagutina; Olga Gerasimova; Valeria Panina; Ljubov Kireeva	Chess	Women's team tournament	20 December
Silver	Ilya Penkov	Snowboarding	Men's big air	19 December
Bronze	Maksim Kovalev	Cross-country skiing	Men's 10 km free technique	13 December
Bronze	Olga Gerasimova	Chess	Women's blitz tournament	13 December
Bronze	Danil Istomin	Snowboarding	Men's parallel giant slalom	13 December
Bronze	Maria Kapustkina	Snowboarding	Women's parallel giant slalom	13 December
Bronze	Andrey Dubovskikh	Cross-country skiing	Men's sprint classic	14 December
Bronze	Tatyana Gorbunova	Cross-country skiing	Women's sprint classic	14 December
Bronze	Eduard Khaladzhan	Snowboarding	Men's parallel slalom	14 December
Bronze	Vladimir Mayorov	Cross-country skiing	Men's 5 km individual	16 December
Bronze	Tatyana Gorbunova	Cross-country skiing	Women's 3 km individual	16 December
Bronze	Stanislav Sokolov	Snowboarding	Men's snowboard cross	16 December
Bronze	Pavel Kazakov	Alpine skiing	Men's slalom	18 December
Bronze	Ilya Penkov	Snowboarding	Men's slopestyle	18 December
Bronze	Ella Shevlyakova	Snowboarding	Women's slopestyle	18 December
Bronze	Men's team	Ice hockey	Men's tournament	21 December

== Alpine skiing ==
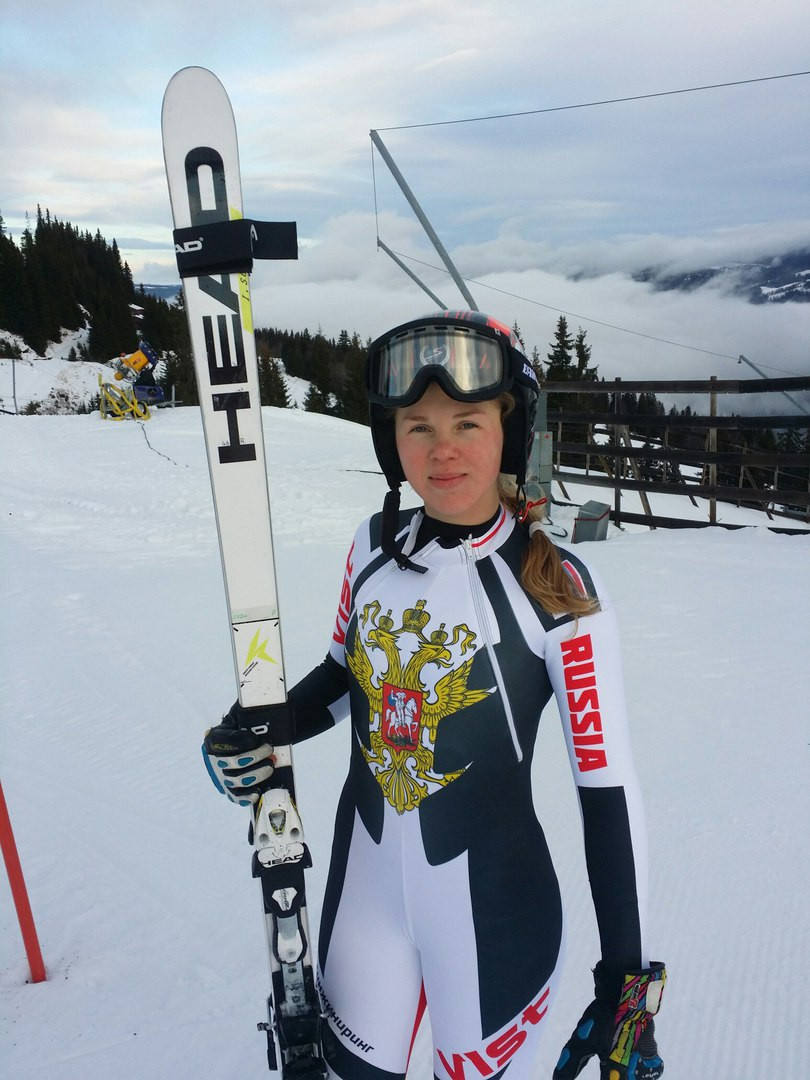
Elena Yakovishina (2015)

Elena Yakovishina won the gold medal in the women's downhill event and in the women's alpine combined event. Yakovishina also won the silver medal in the women's giant slalom event. She also won the gold medals in the women's slalom and the women's Super-G events.

Pavel Kazakov finished in 2nd place in the men's downhill event.

== Chess ==
Yulia Turkeeva won the gold medal in the women's blitz tournament and Olga Gerasimova won the bronze medal in that event.

== Cross-country skiing ==
In total cross-country skiers representing Russia won six gold medals, six silver medals and five bronze medals and the country finished in 1st place in the cross-country skiing medal table.

Lyubov Misharina won the gold medal in the women's sprint classic event. Anna Fedulova and Tatyana Gorbunova, also representing Russia, finished in 2nd and 3rd place in that event.

Vladimir Mayorov won the gold medal in the men's sprint classic event and Andrey Dubovskikh won the bronze medal in that event.

Anna Fedulova won the gold medal in the women's 5 km free technique event and Lyubov Misharina won the silver medal in that event.

In the men's 10 km free technique event Vladimir Mayorov and Maksim Kovalev finished in 2nd and 3rd place respectively.

== Curling ==
Russia won the silver medal in both the men's and women's curling tournaments.

== Ice hockey ==
Russia competed in the ice hockey tournament and won the bronze medal.

== Snowboarding ==
Russia won most of the medals in the snowboarding competition. In total snowboarders representing Russia won seven gold medals, six silver medals and six bronze medals.

In each of the snowboarding events at least one medal was won by a Russian competitor. Additionally, in two events, the men's parallel giant slalom and men's slalom, all medals were won by Russian competitors.
