= Drev =

Drev is a Slovenian surname. Notable people with the surname include:

- Ana Drev, Slovenian alpine skier
- Anja Drev, Slovenian alpine skier
- Miriam Drev, Slovenian poet
