= Ice hockey at the 2015 Winter Deaflympics =

- Venue: Arena Ugra
- Location: Khanty-Mansiysk, Russia
- Dates: 29 March – 5 April
- Nations: 5

Medalists
| gold medal | Russia |
| silver medal | Canada |
| bronze medal | United States |

The ice hockey competition was one of the events held at the 2015 Winter Deaflympics.

== Participating nations ==
- Canada (CAN)
- Finland (FIN)
- Kazakhstan (KAZ)
- Russia (RUS)
- United States (USA)

== Preliminary round ==
| Pos | Team | Pld | W | OTW | OTL | L | GF | GA | GD | Pts | Qualification |
|---|---|---|---|---|---|---|---|---|---|---|---|
| 1 | Canada | 4 | 4 | 0 | 0 | 0 | 27 | 4 | +23 | 12 | Gold medal game |
| 2 | Russia | 4 | 3 | 0 | 0 | 1 | 25 | 9 | +16 | 9 | Gold medal game |
| 3 | United States | 4 | 2 | 0 | 0 | 2 | 31 | 13 | +18 | 6 | Bronze medal game |
| 4 | Finland | 4 | 1 | 0 | 0 | 3 | 17 | 21 | −4 | 3 | Bronze medal game |
| 5 | Kazakhstan | 4 | 0 | 0 | 0 | 4 | 1 | 54 | −53 | 0 | |

Source: powerhockey.info

All times are local (UTC+5).

| 29 March 2015; 15:00 | Kazakhstan | 0–9 (0–1, 0–6, 0–2) | Russia | Arena Ugra |

Game reference

| 29 March 2015; 19:00 | United States | 2–4 (0–0, 1–2, 1–2) | Canada | Arena Ugra |

Game reference

| 30 March 2015; 15:00 | Finland | 3–4 (1–1, 1–1, 1–2) | United States | Arena Ugra |

Game reference

| 30 March 2015; 19:00 | Canada | 14–0 (8–0, 5–0, 1–0) | Kazakhstan | Arena Ugra |

Game reference

| 1 April 2015; 15:00 | Finland | 1–7 (0–3, 1–1, 0–3) | Canada | Arena Ugra |

Game reference

| 1 April 2015; 19:00 | United States | 5–6 (2–2, 1–1, 2–3) | Russia | Arena Ugra |

Game reference

| 2 April 2015; 15:00 | Kazakhstan | 0–20 (0–5, 0–12, 0–3) | United States | Arena Ugra |

Game reference

| 2 April 2015; 19:00 | Finland | 2–9 (0–4, 1–1, 1–4) | Russia | Arena Ugra |

Game reference

| 4 April 2015; 15:00 | Russia | 1–2 (0–0, 1–1, 0–1) | Canada | Arena Ugra |

Game reference

| 4 April 2015; 19:00 | Finland | 11–1 (8–0, 2–1, 1–0) | Kazakhstan | Arena Ugra |

Game reference

== Bronze medal game ==
| 5 April 2015; 11:00 | United States | 6–5 (2–0, 2–1, 2–4) | Finland | Arena Ugra |

Game reference

== Gold medal game ==
| 5 April 2015; 15:00 | Russia | 6–3 (2–1, 2–0, 2–2) | Canada | Arena Ugra |

Game reference
