= Lauren Weibert =

American snowboarder (born 1988)

Personal information
- Nationality: American
- Born: June 17, 1988 (age 38)

Sport
- Country: United States
- Sport: snowboarding
Medal record
Women's snowboarding
Representing United States
Winter Deaflympics
Gold medal – first place	Sondrio 2019	Slopestyle
Silver medal – second place	Sondrio 2019	Big Air
Gold medal – first place	Khanty-Mansiyst 2015	Slopestyle
Silver medal – second place	Khanty-Mansiyst 2015	snowboard cross

Lauren Weibert (born June 17, 1988) is an American deaf snowboarder. She competed at the 2015 Winter Deaflympics and took part in the women's snowboarding competition. She claimed a gold medal in the women's slopestyle event and a silver in the snowboard cross event. She also won the gold medal in the women's slopestyle event at the 2019 Winter Deaflympics.

She was also qualified to represent US at the 2011 Winter Deaflympics, but the event was eventually cancelled due to corruption allegations levelled on Slovak Deaf Sports chief which led to organizational failures.
