= Margarita Noskova =

Russian snowboarder (born 2002)

Personal information
- Nationality: Russian
- Born: 2002 (age 23–24)

Sport
- Country: Russia
- Sport: snowboarding
Medal record
Women's snowboarding
Representing Russia
Winter Deaflympics
Gold medal – first place	Sondrio 2019	snowboard cross
Gold medal – first place	Sondrio 2019	big air
Silver medal – second place	Sondrio 2019	slopestyle

Margarita Sergeevna Noskova (born 2002) is a Russian deaf snowboarder. She represented Russia at the 2019 Winter Deaflympics on her maiden Deaflympic appearance and claimed gold medals in women's big air and snowboard cross events.
