= Snowboarding at the 2019 Winter Deaflympics =

- Location: Province of Sondrio, Italy
- Dates: 13–19 December

Snowboarding was one of the competitions held at the 2019 Winter Deaflympics. Russia won most of the medals in the competition.

== Medal table ==
* Host nation (Italy)

Rank	Nation	Gold	Silver	Bronze	Total
1	Russia (RUS)	7	6	6	19
2	United States (USA)	2	1	2	5
3	Czech Republic (CZE)	1	0	0	1
4	Finland (FIN)	0	2	0	2
5	Austria (AUT)	0	1	0	1
6	China (CHN)	0	0	1	1
6	Italy (ITA)*	0	0	1	1
Totals (7 entries)		10	10	10	30

== Medal summary ==
=== Men ===
Event	Gold	Silver	Bronze
Parallel giant slalom	Aleksei Kazantsev; Russia	Petr Lebedev; Russia	Danil Istomin; Russia
Parallel slalom	Aleksei Kazantsev; Russia	Danil Istomin; Russia	Eduard Khaladzhan; Russia
Snowboard cross	Tomáš Pazdera; Czech Republic	Alexey Ignatenko; Russia	Stanislav Sokolov; Russia
Slopestyle	Sean Esson; United States	Stanislav Sokolov; Russia	Ilya Penkov; Russia
Big air	Nikita Goryachev; Russia	Ilya Penkov; Russia	Sean Esson; United States

=== Women ===
Event	Gold	Silver	Bronze
Parallel giant slalom	Anna Surmilina; Russia	Cecilia Hanhikoski; Finland	Maria Kapustkina; Russia
Parallel slalom	Anna Surmilina; Russia	Cecilia Hanhikoski; Finland	Zhao Yueyue; China
Snowboard cross	Margarita Noskova; Russia	Lisa Zörweg; Austria	Erica Dugnani; Italy
Slopestyle	Lauren Weibert; United States	Margarita Noskova; Russia	Ella Shevlyakova; Russia
Big air	Margarita Noskova; Russia	Lauren Weibert; United States	Lauren Benedict; United States
