= Kock (surname) =

Kock is a surname literally meaning "cook" in some languages. Notable people with this surname include:

- Annuar Kock, Aruban footballer
- Axel Kock, Swedish philologist
- Elrich Kock, South African rugby union player
- Elsebeth Kock-Petersen, Danish politician
- Henry Kock (1952–2005), horticulturist, eco-activist, and founder of the Elm Recovery Project in Ontario
- Johan Kock (1861–1951), Finnish soldier, revolutionary and businessman
- Karin Kock-Lindberg, Swedish politician
- Kristina Kock, Austrian skier
- Ned Kock, Brazilian-American philosopher
- Nils Kock, surgeon, the namesake of the Kock pouch
- Osmo Kock, Finnish politician
- Putte Kock (1901–1979), Swedish sportsman
- Quinton de Kock, South African cricketer
- Theodor Kock (1820–1901), biologist, the namesake of Kock's mouse-eared bat
- Ulla Kock am Brink, German TV presenter
- Vera Kock (born 1952), Swedish former swimmer
- Winston Kock (1909–1982), first director of NASA Electronics Research Center in Cambridge, Massachusetts
