= Kristina Köck =

Austrian para-alpine skier

Personal information
- Nationality: Austrian
- Born: 7 August 1995 (age 30)

Sport
- Country: Austria
- Sport: alpine skiing
Medal record
Women's alpine skiing
Representing Austria
Winter Deaflympics
Bronze medal – third place	Khanty-Mansiysk 2015	Slalom

Kristina Köck (also spelled Koeck, born 7 August 1995) is an Austrian female deaf alpine skier. She is also the elder sister of fellow Austrian alpine skier, Melissa Köck.

Kristina participated at the 2015 Winter Deaflympics and competed in the women's giant slalom, slalom, downhill, Super-G and super combined events. She claimed her only Deaflympic medal which was a bronze medal in the women's slalom event at the 2015 Winter Deaflympics as the silver medal in the relevant criteria was claimed by her sister, Melissa Köck while the gold medal was clinched by Tereza Kmochová.
