= United States at the 2019 Winter Deaflympics =

- IPC code: USA
- NPC: USA Deaf Sports Association
- Website: www.usdeafsports.org

in Valtellina, Valchiavenna
- Competitors: 42 in 6 sports
- Medals Ranked 4th: Gold 3 Silver 1 Bronze 2 Total 6

Winter Deaflympics appearances (overview)
- 1967; 1971; 1975; 1979; 1983; 1987; 1991; 1995; 1999; 2003; 2007; 2015; 2019; 2023

The United States competed at the 2019 Winter Deaflympics which was held in Valtellina and Valchiavenna, Italy, from December 12 to 21, 2019. The United States was one of the 34 nations to compete at the multi-sport event. This was the nation's 12th appearance at the Winter Deaflympics, having regularly participated at the event since making its debut in 1967. 42 athletes represented the United States at the Deaflympics in all six sporting events including chess, cross-country skiing, curling, ice hockey, alpine skiing, and snowboarding.

== Medalists ==
Medal	Name	Sport	Event	Date
Gold	Sean Esson	Snowboarding	Men's slopestyle	December 18
Gold	Lauren Weibert	Snowboarding	Women's slopestyle	December 18
Gold	Men's team	Ice hockey	Ice hockey tournament	December 21
Silver	Lauren Weibert	Snowboarding	Women's big air	December 19
Bronze	Sean Esson	Snowboarding	Men's big air	December 19
Bronze	Lauren Benedict	Snowboarding	Women's big air	December 19

== Participants ==
Name
Lauren Weibert
Curran Allison
Lauren Benedict
Troy Benson
Byron Bridges
Christian Buczek
Eric Cohen
Sean Esson
Max Finley
Herman Fuechtmann
Henry Fusco
Miles Gates
Garrett Gintoli
Peter Gintoli
Abraham Glasser
William Holtzer
Samuel Holzrichter
Scott Humes
Grant Isenbarger
John Knetzger
Ryne Krueger
Daniel Kurchena
Anders Lindgren
Jeffrey Mansfield
Trevor McHugh
Keith Mischo
David Nathanson
Artern Novoselov
Tomas Oricchio
Luke Peinado
Oscar Petrov
Jeffrey Pollock
Calvin Rausch
Jake Schlereth
Christopher Smith
Max Stephens
Branton Stewart
Derek Struwing

== Ice hockey ==
In July 2019, the American men's deaf ice hockey team announced a squad consisting of 23 players for the event. The men's team will be captained by Peter Gintoli while his younger brother Garrett Gintoli will serve as his deputy. The women's team was not eligible to compete at the event as the women's ice hockey event was discontinued by the organizers and by the International Committee of Sports for the Deaf due to the low number of participants. The men's team defeated Canada 7–3 in the final to secure its first gold medal ever in Winter Deaflympics.

== Snowboarding ==
In total snowboarders representing the United States won two gold medals, one silver medal and two bronze medals and the country finished in 2nd place in the snowboarding medal table.
