= Germany at the 2019 Winter Deaflympics =

- Flag of Germany
- IPC code: GER

in Province of Sondrio, Italy 12 December 2019 – 21 December 2019
- Medals Ranked 13th: Gold 0 Silver 1 Bronze 0 Total 1

Winter Deaflympics appearances
- 1949; 1953; 1955; 1959; 1963; 1967; 1971; 1975; 1979; 1983; 1987; 1991; 1995; 1999; 2003; 2007; 2015; 2019; 2023

Germany competed at the 2019 Winter Deaflympics held between 12 and 21 December 2019 in Province of Sondrio in Northern Italy. The country won one silver medal and the country finished in 13th place in the medal table.

== Medalists ==
Medal	Name	Sport	Event	Date
Silver	Artur Kevorkov; Wolfgang Kössler; Sergej Salov; Mohammed Reza Ghadimi; Sascha Bernwald	Chess	Men Team	20 December

== Chess ==
The men's team won the silver medal in the men's tournament.
