= South Korea at the 2019 Winter Deaflympics =

- Flag of South Korea
- IPC code: KOR

in Province of Sondrio, Italy 12 December 2019 – 21 December 2019
- Medals Ranked 16th: Gold 0 Silver 0 Bronze 1 Total 1

Winter Deaflympics appearances
- 1949; 1953; 1955; 1959; 1963; 1967; 1971; 1975; 1979; 1983; 1987; 1991; 1995; 1999; 2003; 2007; 2015; 2019; 2023

South Korea competed at the 2019 Winter Deaflympics held between 12 and 21 December 2019 in Province of Sondrio in Northern Italy. The country won one bronze medal and the country finished in 16th place in the medal table.

== Medalists ==
Medal	Name	Sport	Event	Date
Bronze	South Korea	Curling	Women's tournament	20 December

== Curling ==
South Korea won the bronze medal in the women's curling tournament.
