= France at the 2019 Winter Deaflympics =

- Flag of France
- IPC code: FRA

in Province of Sondrio, Italy 12 December 2019 – 21 December 2019
- Medals Ranked 9th: Gold 0 Silver 3 Bronze 2 Total 5

Winter Deaflympics appearances (overview)
- 1975; 1979; 1983; 1987; 1991; 1995; 1999; 2003–2007; 2015; 2019; 2023

France competed at the 2019 Winter Deaflympics held between 12 and 21 December 2019 in Province of Sondrio in Northern Italy. The country won three silver medals and two bronze medals, all in alpine skiing. The country finished in 9th place in the medal table.

== Medalists ==
Medal	Name	Sport	Event	Date
Silver	Nicolas Sarremejane	Alpine skiing	Men's Super-G	15 December
Silver	Nicolas Sarremejane	Alpine skiing	Men's giant slalom	16 December
Silver	Nicolas Sarremejane	Alpine skiing	Men's slalom	17 December
Bronze	Nicolas Sarremejane	Alpine skiing	Men's alpine combined	14 December
Bronze	Thomas Luxcey	Alpine skiing	Men's Super-G	15 December

== Alpine skiing ==
Nicolas Sarremejane won the silver medal in the men's Super-G, men's giant slalom and men's slalom events. He also won the bronze medal in the men's alpine combined event.

Thomas Luxcey won the bronze medal in the men's Super-G event.
