= List of mayors of Sondrio =

Mayors of Sondrio

Mayor of Sondrio
- Sindaco di Sondrio
- Incumbent; Marco Scaramellini since 26 June 2018
- Appointer: Popular election
- Term length: 5 years, renewable once
- Formation: 1861
- Website: Official website

The mayor of Sondrio is an elected politician who, along with the Sondrio's city council, is accountable for the strategic government of Sondrio in Lombardy, Italy.

The current mayor is Marco Scaramellini who took office on 26 June 2018.

== Overview ==
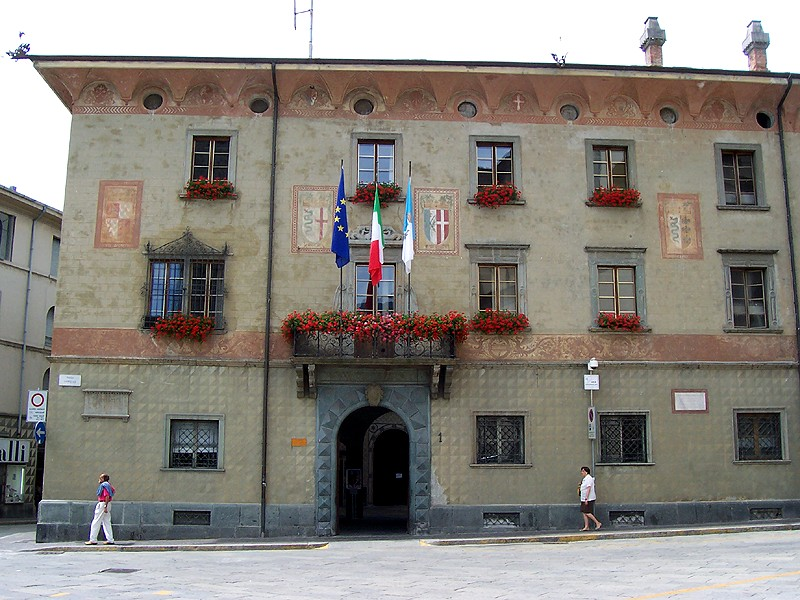
Palazzo Pretorio is the seat of the Mayor of Sondrio.

According to the Italian Constitution, the mayor of Sondrio is member of the city council.

The mayor is elected by the population of Sondrio, who also elects the members of the city council, controlling the mayor's policy guidelines and is able to enforce his resignation by a motion of no confidence. The mayor is entitled to appoint and release the members of his government.

Since 1994 the mayor is elected directly by Sondrio's electorate: in all mayoral elections in Italy in cities with a population higher than 15,000 the voters express a direct choice for the mayor or an indirect choice voting for the party of the candidate's coalition. If no candidate receives at least 50% of votes, the top two candidates go to a second round after two weeks. The election of the City Council is based on a direct choice for the candidate with a preference vote: the candidate with the majority of the preferences is elected. The number of the seats for each party is determined proportionally.

== Italian Republic (since 1946) ==
=== City Council election (1946-1994) ===
From 1946 to 1994, the mayor of Sondrio was elected by the City's council.

	Mayor	Term start	Term end	Party
1	Giulio Carugo	13 April 1946	21 September 1953	DC
2	Arturo Schena	21 September 1953	15 December 1964	DC
3	Saverio Venosta	15 December 1964	30 October 1975	DC
4	Alberto Frizziero	30 October 1975	30 July 1985	DC
5	Primo Buzzetti	30 July 1985	14 July 1990	DC
6	Flaminio Benetti	14 July 1990	11 August 1994	DC
Special Prefectural Commissioner tenure (11 August 1994 – 5 December 1994)

=== Direct election (since 1994) ===
Since 1994, under provisions of new local administration law, the mayor of Sondrio is chosen by direct election, originally every four then every five years.

	Mayor	Term start	Term end	Party	Coalition	Election
7	Alcide Molteni	5 December 1994	14 December 1998	PDS; DS	PDS	1994
7	Alcide Molteni	14 December 1998	10 June 2003	PDS; DS	PDS • PPI • PRC	1998
8	Bianca Bianchini	10 June 2003	21 August 2007 (Note: Resigned.)	FI	FI • LN • AN • UDC	2003
Special Prefectural Commissioner tenure (21 August 2007 – 29 April 2008)
(7)	Alcide Molteni	29 April 2008	28 May 2013	PD	PD • SA • PSI	2008
(7)	Alcide Molteni	28 May 2013	26 June 2018	PD	PD • SEL • PSI	2013
9	Marco Scaramellini	26 June 2018	16 May 2023	Ind	FI • LN	2018
9	Marco Scaramellini	16 May 2023	Incumbent	Ind	FdI • FI • LN	2023
