= Finland at the 2019 Winter Deaflympics =

- Flag of Finland
- IPC code: FIN

in Province of Sondrio, Italy 12 December 2019 – 21 December 2019
- Medals Ranked 10th: Gold 0 Silver 2 Bronze 1 Total 3

Winter Deaflympics appearances
- 1949; 1953; 1955; 1959; 1963; 1967; 1971; 1975; 1979; 1983; 1987; 1991; 1995; 1999; 2003; 2007; 2015; 2019; 2023

Finland competed at the 2019 Winter Deaflympics held between 12 and 21 December 2019 in Province of Sondrio in Northern Italy. The country won two silver medals and one bronze medal and the country finished in 10th place in the medal table.

== Medalists ==
| Medal | Name | Sport | Event | Date |
|---|---|---|---|---|
| Silver | Cecilia Hanhikoski | Snowboarding | Women's parallel giant slalom event | 13 December |
| Silver | Cecilia Hanhikoski | Snowboarding | Women's parallel slalom event | 14 December |
| Bronze | Men's team | Curling | Men's tournament | 20 December |

== Curling ==
Finland won the bronze medal in the men's tournament.

== Ice hockey ==
Finland competed in the ice hockey tournament and they lost their bronze medal match against Russia.

== Snowboarding ==
Cecilia Hanhikoski won the silver medal in the women's parallel giant slalom event and in the women's parallel slalom event.
