= Brenda Davidson =

Canadian curler

Personal information
- Born: September 20, 1964 (age 61) Thompson, Manitoba, Canada

Sport
- Country: Canada
- Sport: Curling
Medal record
Representing Canada
Women's curling
Winter Deaflympics
Bronze medal – third place	Khanty-Mansiysk 2015	team

Brenda Davidson (born 20 September 1964) is a Canadian female curler. She competed at the 2015 Winter Deaflympics at the age of 50.

Davidson started her curling career (deaf curling) at the age of just 18. She has also participated in the Women's Deaf Canadian Championships twice in 1999 and in 2003.

In the 2015 Winter Deaflympics held in Russia, she won the bronze medal in the curling team event.

Brenda Davidson is currently coaching Special Olympics curling in the city of Thompson.
