= Deafness in Uzbekistan =

Deafness and deaf services in Uzbekistan

Deafness in Uzbekistan has cultural and medical implications. In 2019, the Society of the Deaf of Uzbekistan recorded that approximately 21,212 people, adults and children, are deaf or hard-of-hearing. The primary sign language of Uzbekistan is Russian Sign Language (RSL).

In most post-Soviet countries, RSL is the primary language used within deaf communities. However, research shows that many post-Soviet countries also have their own language. This change can be traced to different location or cultural differences between these countries.

Uzbek Sign Language (UZL) is a dialect of RSL, and while it has many phrases different from RSL, it is not recognized by the government as an official language in Uzbekistan.

== History ==
Before the dissolution of the Soviet Union, Uzbekistan was one of the countries in the union. The Uzbek Society of the Deaf, under the USSR's Ministry of Social Welfare, ran vocational training and employment workshops for deaf people. These enterprises were granted monopolies to supply certain goods and fill state orders, and earned a profit. To increase accessibility, residential buildings and community centers were built for deaf workers near the factories. These residential areas became known as gorodok glukhikh, or "towns of the deaf".

After the fall of the Soviet Union, many government-run organizations lost funding. The Uzbek Society of the Deaf, previously funded by the Soviet Union, became a non-profit organization. Without the extra financial support, the Uzbek Society of the Deaf eventually declared bankruptcy, and as a result, the many deaf and hard-of-hearing lost their jobs and homes. Today, there are only about ten training facilities that specifically cater to deaf and hard-of-hearing people. Only 240–250 Uzbek deaf and hard-of-hearing people benefit from these services across the country.

== Deaf identity ==
=== Uzbek Sign Language ===
Uzbek Sign Language (USL) is not recognized by the federal government of Uzbekistan. Instead, USL is more regarded as a "means of interpersonal communication", or casual conversation. Without recognition, sign language programs are not prioritized in schools or as a means to share information with deaf and hard-of-hearing people. During the start of the COVID-19 pandemic, national information was spread with USL interpretation to increase accessibility for the first time, but the quality of the interpretation was still poor.

=== Education ===
In 2019, about 5,000 deaf and hard-of-hearing students were recorded to be studying in schools specializing in deaf education across Uzbekistan. The lack of government recognition and funding deaf programs results in sign language not being supported as a full scale language of instruction in deaf schools. The majority of teachers in these specialized schools do not have any training in Uzbek or Russian sign language, so deaf students must learn how to lip read and articulate words.

The curriculum for specialized deaf schools in Uzbekistan differs from the national curriculum. Deaf students in specialized schools attend extended day programs to catch up on material, and they graduate a year later than non-deaf students. Sign language interpretation for deaf students is not common in general education classrooms.

=== Employment ===
Because of the lack of education and language skills possessed by deaf individuals in Uzbekistan, many deaf workers struggle to find stable jobs. Currently, deaf men from all over Uzbekistan travel to the capital city Tashkent and work labor jobs or various merchant jobs. Deaf merchants will often sell souvenirs or toys on the side of the road. Some deaf women weigh people for money in public places.

=== Lack of resources ===
Language interpretation services for deaf and hard-of-hearing people are deeply underfunded and often poorly mandated. Reports show that there are not enough USL and RSL interpreters to sustain communication between deaf and non-deaf communities in Uzbekistan. As a result, USL and RSL interpreters face burnout, as their jobs entail a lot of work. Interpreters work to protect deaf rights in justice courts, during police encounters, for tax-related incidents, and for medical assessments.

In Uzbekistan, the hours of sign language services are not regulated by the government, and therefore not included in public service resources provided to Uzbek deaf communities.

== Deaf associations ==
=== The Cultural Centre for Deaf People in Tashkent ===
The Cultural Centre for Deaf People in Tashkent works to increase accessibility for deaf people in Uzbekistan. In 2014, the Cultural Centre for Deaf People in Tashkent received the first Uzbekistan President's Award on behalf of Akihiko Tanaka, the president of the Japan International Cooperation Agency. The international award recognizes individuals and organizations who have done significant work and positively impacted communities worldwide.

=== Japan International Cooperation Agency ===
The Japan International Cooperation Agency (JICA) has shown support for increasing disability resources for deaf people in Uzbekistan. JICA partners with organizations around the world to assist countries affected by disaster to achieve quality and equitable learning in education sectors ranging from pre-kindergarten to higher education. In September 2018, the Cultural Centre of Deaf People of Tashkent participated in their first Asian Deaf-blind Conference in Japan.

== See also ==
- Deafness in Poland
- Uzbekistan at the Deaflympics
