= Elena Yakovishina =

Russian alpine skier (born 1992)

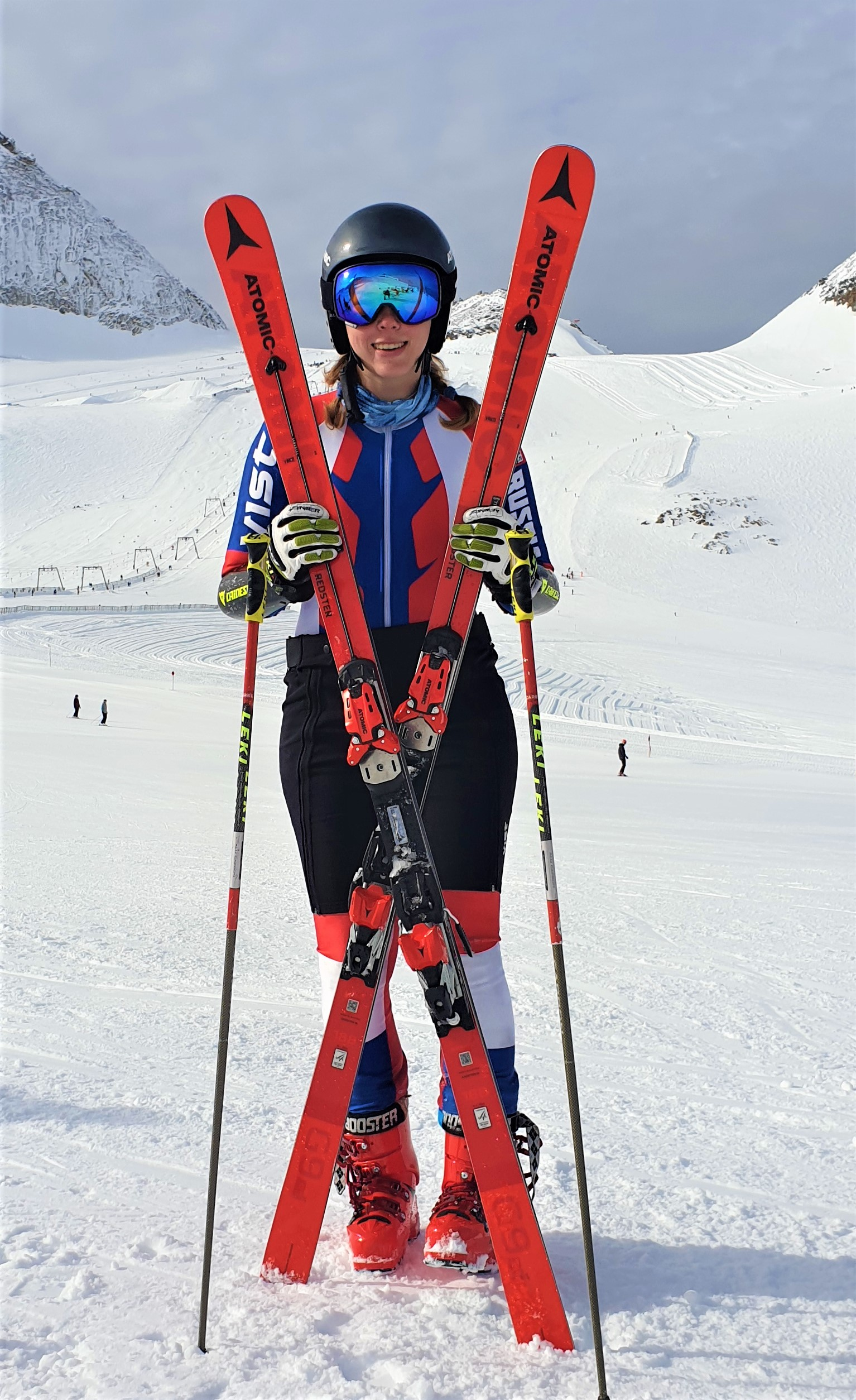
- Yakovishina in 2015

Personal information
- Born: 17 September 1992 (age 33) Petropavlovsk-Kamchatsky, Russia
- Height: 1.70 m (5 ft 7 in)
- Weight: 70 kg (154 lb)

Sport
- Country: Russia
- Sport: Alpine skiing
Medal record
Women's Alpine skiing
XIX Winter Deaflympics
Gold medal – first place	Province of Sondrio 2019	Downhill
Gold medal – first place	Province of Sondrio 2019	Super-G
Gold medal – first place	Province of Sondrio 2019	Slalom
Gold medal – first place	Province of Sondrio 2019	Alpine combined
Silver medal – second place	Province of Sondrio 2019	Giant slalom
Winter Universiade
Gold medal – first place	2017 Almaty	Super-G
2nd World deaf alpine skiing championship 2017
Gold medal – first place	2017 Innerkrems	Downhill
Gold medal – first place	2017 Innerkrems	Super-G
Gold medal – first place	2017 Innerkrems	Combination
Silver medal – second place	2017 Innerkrems	Giant slalom
Silver medal – second place	2017 Innerkrems	Slalom

Elena Yakovishina (born 17 September 1992 in Petropavlovsk-Kamchatsky, Russia) is an alpine skier from Russia. She competed for Russia at the 2014 Winter Olympics in the alpine skiing events.

== Biography ==
She was born on 17 September 1992 in the city of Petropavlovsk-Kamchatsky, Russia. She was born hearing-impaired, her disability certificate was issued in 2016.

For the first time she stood on mountain skis when she was three years old, her parents haven't had peace of mind ever since. When she was 5 years old, she was admitted to Edelveis Ski School in Petropavlovsk-Kamchatsky to be trained by honored Russian coach A. Katalagin.

Elena is currently training independently in Europe, with support from her partner, Cristian Simari Birkner. At present, she does not have sponsorship to employ a coach or to join a professional team.

Education. Higher (baccalaureate). In 2016 she graduated with honors from the Russian State University of Physical Education, Sport, Youth and Tourism (SCOLIPE), with a qualification of an Alpine Skiing coach-teacher.

== Career in healthy sport ==
First World Cup start - 29 January 2012 St. Moritz (SUI).

On Olympic Games 2014 in Sochi she was 14th place in Combination, 28th in Downhill and 24th in Super-G.

On winter Universiade 2017 Alma-Ati she got 1st place in super-g.

== Career in deaf sport ==
So, from 2016 Elena is racing in deaf sport. Many times she won Russian deaf national championship.

She raced in Deaflympic games 2019 and did greatest results for Russian deaf alpine ski sport. 4 gold and 1 silver medal in Santa Caterina (Italy)

She did also second World deaf alpine skiing championship 2017 where she won three gold and two silver medals.

== Equipments ==
She is using skis and boots from Atomic and ski poles from Leki.
