= Beatrice Brunnbauer =

Austrian alpine skier (born 1992)

Personal information
- Nationality: Austrian
- Born: 25 March 1992 (age 34)

Sport
- Country: Austria
- Sport: alpine skiing
Medal record
Women's Alpine skiing
Representing Austria
Winter Deaflympics
Bronze medal – third place	Khanty-Mansiysk 2015	Giant slalom
Bronze medal – third place	Khanty-Mansiysk 2015	Super combined
Bronze medal – third place	Khanty-Mansiysk 2015	Super-G

Beatrice Brunnbauer (born 25 March 1992) is an Austrian female deaf alpine skier. She represented Austria at the 2015 Winter Deaflympics and competed in the women's slalom, giant slalom, Super-G, super combined and downhill events.

She claimed bronze medals in the women's giant slalom, Super-G and super combined categories at the 2015 Winter Deaflympics.
