= Chess at the 2019 Winter Deaflympics =

- Venue: Hotel Aurora
- Dates: 13–20 December

The chess competition was held at the 2019 Winter Deaflympics between 13 and 20 December 2019 at Hotel Aurora except on 18 December. The chess competition which was chosen as a sport being part of the multi-sport event was an unprecedented move and it made its debut at this edition of the Winter Deaflympics.

Both men and women took part in the singles blitz event and in the team event.

== Medal table ==
* Host nation (Italy)

Rank	Nation	Gold	Silver	Bronze	Total
1	Russia (RUS)	1	1	1	3
2	Ukraine (UKR)	1	1	0	2
3	Israel (ISR)	1	0	0	1
3	Kazakhstan (KAZ)	1	0	0	1
5	Poland (POL)	0	1	1	2
6	Germany (GER)	0	1	0	1
7	Croatia (CRO)	0	0	1	1
7	Italy (ITA)*	0	0	1	1
Totals (8 entries)		4	4	4	12

== Medal summary ==
Event	Gold	Silver	Bronze
Men Blitz	Yehuda Gruenfeld; Israel	Mateusz Łapaj; Poland	Duilio Collutiis; Italy
Women Blitz	Yulia Turkeeva; Russia	Tatiana Baklanova; Ukraine	Olga Gerasimova; Russia
Men's team	Kazakhstan; Samazhan Kettebekov; Viktor Maksimenko; Amangeldy Nauryzgaliev; Berik Nurymov; Dmitry Mochalsky; Maxim Rozhkov	Germany; Artur Kevorkov; Wolfgang Kössler; Sergej Salov; Mohammed Reza Ghadimi; Sascha Bernwald	Croatia; Zlatko Klarić; Goran Cechi; Emil Nikolić; Bogdan Božinović; Toni Vujčić; Darko Švec
Women's team	Ukraine; Tatiana Baklanova; Natalya Myronenko; Svitlana Gonchar; Alona Osypova; Alina Lyanguzova; Inga Rudenko	Russia; Natalia Kudriavtseva; Yulia Turkeeva; Olga Lagutina; Olga Gerasimova; Valeria Panina; Ljubov Kireeva	Poland; Monika Kobylińska; Joanna Strześniewska; Izabela Towarnicka; Malwina Szewczyk; Ewa Wardziak; Bożena Krzyszkowiak
