= Melissa Köck =

Austrian alpine skier

Personal information
- Nationality: Austrian
- Born: 27 June 1997 (age 29)

Sport
- Country: Austria
- Sport: alpine skiing
Medal record
Women's alpine skiing
Representing Austria
Winter Deaflympics
Silver medal – second place	Khanty-Mansiysk 2015	Giant slalom
Silver medal – second place	Khanty-Mansiysk 2015	Slalom
Silver medal – second place	Khanty-Mansiysk 2015	Super combined
Silver medal – second place	Khanty-Mansiysk 2015	Super-G
Bronze medal – third place	Sondrio 2019	Alpine combined
Bronze medal – third place	Sondrio 2019	Giant slalom
Bronze medal – third place	Sondrio 2019	Slalom

Melissa Köck (also spelled Koeck, born 27 June 1997) is an Austrian female deaf alpine skier. She competed at the 2015 Winter Deaflympics and competed in the women's downhill, giant slalom, slalom, Super-G and super combined events. She is also the younger sister of fellow Austrian alpine skier, Kristina Köck.

Melissa in her Deaflympic debut at the 2015 Winter Deaflympics, claimed four silver medals in the women's giant slalom, slalom, super combined and Super-G events as the gold medals in the relevant categories were won by Czech alpine skier, Tereza Kmochová. She also represented Austria at the 2019 Winter Deaflympics where she won three bronze medals.
