= Croatia at the 2019 Winter Deaflympics =

- Flag of Croatia
- IPC code: CRO

in Province of Sondrio, Italy 12 December 2019 – 21 December 2019
- Medals Ranked 15th: Gold 0 Silver 0 Bronze 3 Total 3

Winter Deaflympics appearances
- 1949; 1953; 1955; 1959; 1963; 1967; 1971; 1975; 1979; 1983; 1987; 1991; 1995; 1999; 2003; 2007; 2015; 2019; 2023

Croatia competed at the 2019 Winter Deaflympics held between 12 and 21 December 2019 in Province of Sondrio in Northern Italy. The country won three bronze medals and the country finished in 15th place in the medal table.

== Medalists ==
Medal	Name	Sport	Event	Date
Bronze	Rea Hraski	Alpine skiing	Women's downhill	13 December
Bronze	Rea Hraski	Alpine skiing	Women's Super-G	15 December
Bronze	Zlatko Klarić; Goran Cechi; Emil Nikolić; Bogdan Božinović; Toni Vujčić; Darko Švec	Chess	Men Team	20 December

== Alpine skiing ==
Rea Hraski won the bronze medal in both the women's downhill and women's Super-G events.

== Chess ==
The men's team won the bronze medal in the men's tournament.

== Curling ==
Croatia lost their bronze medal match against South Korea in the women's curling tournament.
