= Yehuda Gruenfeld =

Israeli chess grandmaster (born 1956)

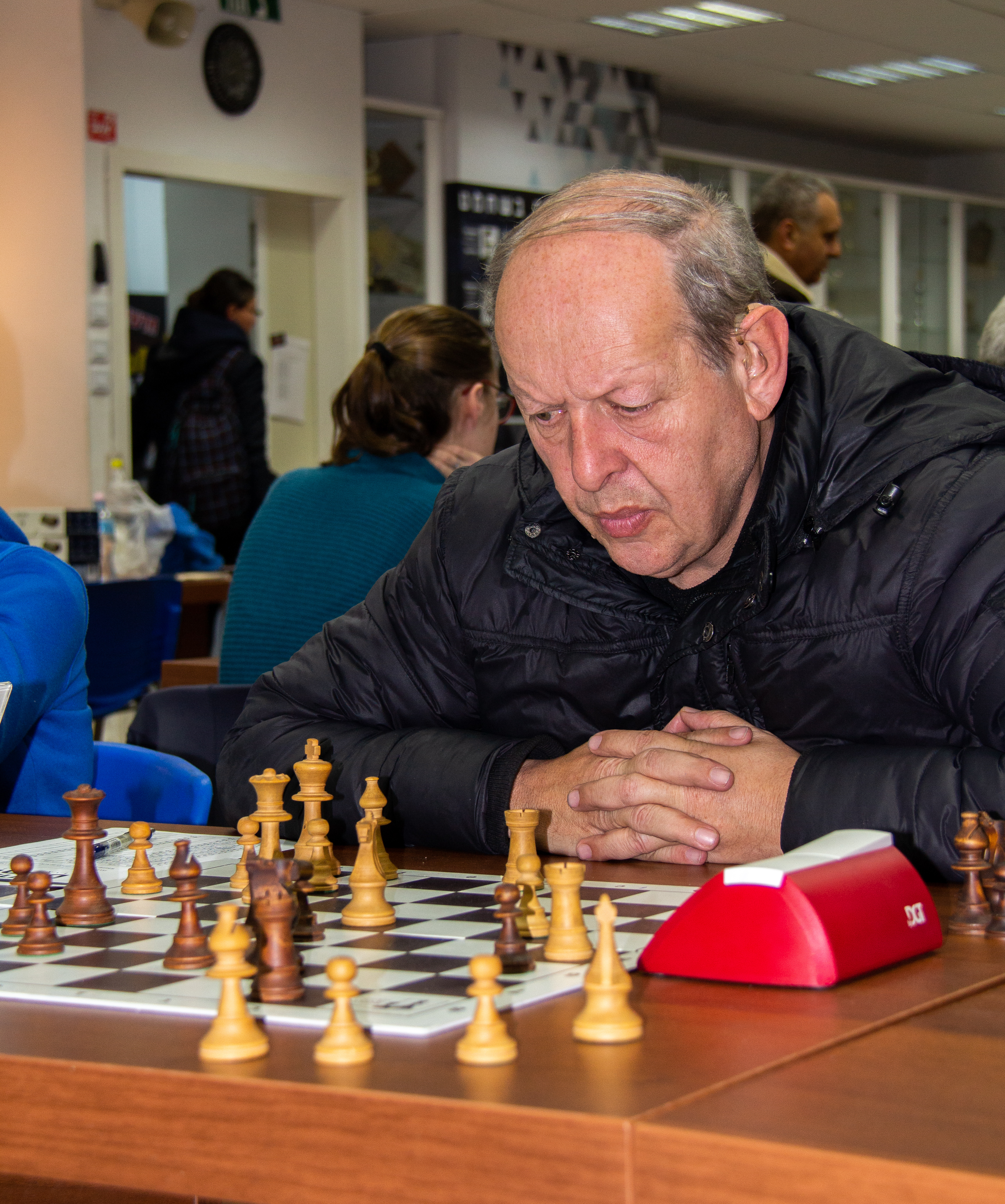

Personal information
- Native name: יהודה גרינפלד
- Born: 28 February 1956 (age 70) Dzierżoniów, Poland

Chess career
- Country: Israel
- Title: Grandmaster (1980)
- Peak rating: 2550 (July 1986)

Yehuda Gruenfeld (Hebrew: יהודה גרינפלד; born 18 February 1956) is an Israeli chess player, who holds the title of grandmaster.

== Career ==
He was born in Dzierżoniów, Poland. In 1974, Gruenfeld won the Israeli championship for youth players. In 1978, he tied for 2nd-5th in Skien. In 1978, he won in Gausdal. In 1979, he tied for 1st-2nd in Biel. In 1979, he took 2nd in the Lucerne Zonal. In 1979, he took 12th in the Riga Interzonal, won by Mikhail Tal.

In 1980, he tied for 3rd-4th in Beer Sheva, tied for 2nd-8th in Lugano, tied for 2nd-4th in Gausdal, tied for 1st-4th in Oberwart, tied for 2nd-5th in Ramat Hasharon, and won in Biel. In 1981, he tied for 1st-3rd in Lugano, and won in New York.

In 1982, Gruenfeld won the Israeli championship. In 1984, he won in Dortmund. In 1985, he was equal first with Maxim Dlugy and Dmitry Gurevich at the 13th World Open of Philadelphia (Dlugy won the play-off). In 1987, he won the Munich Zonal). In 1987, he tied for 8-11th in the Zagreb Interzonal, won by Viktor Korchnoi. In 1990, he again won the Israeli championship.

Gruenfeld played for Israel in six Chess Olympiads:

- In 1978, at second reserve board in the 23rd Olympiad in Buenos Aires (+2 –0 =7);
- In 1980, at third board in the 24th Olympiad in La Valletta (+6 –3 =2);
- In 1982, at first board in the 25th Olympiad in Lucerne (+2 –2 =7);
- In 1984, at first board in the 26th Olympiad in Thessaloniki (+3 –4 =4);
- In 1990, at second board in the 29th Olympiad in Novi Sad (+0 –3 =5);
- In 1992, at first reserve board in the 30th Olympiad in Manila (+4 –1 =4).

FIDE awarded him the International Master title in 1978, and the International Grandmaster title in 1980.

Gruenfeld is deaf, but is able to speak, however hoarsely, and can read lips. He played in 5 Olympiads (from 2010 to 2018) on the first board for the International Chess Committee of the Deaf team.

He claimed gold medal in the men's blitz event at the 2019 Winter Deaflympics where chess was officially included as a medal sport for the first time.

== Brilliant game ==
Chandler vs. Gruenfeld, Lone Pine 1979

Position: g1 black bishop, f1 white rook, b1 white rook, g2 white king, d2 white bishop, c2 white queen, g3 white pawn, c3 white knight, g4 black pawn, f4 white pawn, e4 white pawn, c4 black pawn, a4 white pawn, d5 white pawn, b5 white pawn, a5 black pawn, g6 black pawn, d6 black pawn, b6 black queen, f7 black king, e7 black pawn, d7 black knight, h8 black rook, a8 black rook

Final position

This is an example of his sharp tactical acumen, against the future grandmaster Murray Chandler, who later included it in his own book “How to Beat Your Dad at Chess, position 105:

Murray G Chandler vs Yehuda Gruenfeld, Lone Pine, R7, 2 April 1979: 1.e4 c6 2.d4 g6 3.c4 Bg7 4.Nc3 d6 5.f4 Qb6 6.Nf3 Bg4 7.d5 Nd7 8.Na4 Qc7 9.Bd2 Ngf6 10.Bd3 O-O 11.Rc1 cxd5 12.cxd5 Qb8 13.b4 b5 14.Nc3 a6 15.O-O Nb6 16.a4 Nc4 17.Bxc4 bxc4 18.Rb1 a5 19.b5 Nd7 20.Qc2 Qb6+ 21.Kh1 Rfc8 22.Ng5 h6 23.Nxf7 Kxf7 24.h3 h5 25.hxg4 hxg4 26.Kh2 Bd4 27.g3 Rh8+ 28.Kg2 Bg1!! (threatening 29...Rh2#, but if 29.Rxg1, then 29...Rh2+! 30.Kxh2 [30.Kf1 Qf2#] 30...Qf2+ 31.Kh1 (or 31.Rg2) 31...Rh8#) 0-1
