= Anja Drev =

Slovenian deaf female alpine skier

Personal information
- Born: 9 July 1997 (age 28)

Sport
- Country: Slovenia
- Sport: alpine skiing
Medal record
Women's alpine skiing
Representing Slovenia
Winter Deaflympics
Bronze medal – third place	Khanty-Mansiysk 2015	Downhill

Anja Drev (born 9 July 1997) is a Slovenian deaf female alpine skier. She competed at the 2015 Winter Deaflympics and participated in the women's downhill, giant slalom, slalom, Super-G and super combined events.

She claimed a bronze medal in the women's downhill event as the other alpine skiing events were mainly dominated by Czech alpine skier, Tereza Kmochová.
