= Tone Tangen Myrvoll =

Former Norwegian cross country skier

Personal information
- Nationality: Norwegian
- Born: 12 May 1965 (age 61) Oslo, Norway

Sport
- Country: Norway
- Sport: cross-country skiing
Medal record
Women's cross-country skiing
Representing Norway
Event / 1st / 2nd / 3rd; Winter Deaflympics / 11 / 2 / 2
Winter Deaflympics
Gold medal – first place	Oslo 1987	5km
Gold medal – first place	Oslo 1987	10km
Gold medal – first place	Banff 1991	5km
Gold medal – first place	Banff 1991	10km
Gold medal – first place	Ylläs 1995	5km
Gold medal – first place	Ylläs 1995	10km
Gold medal – first place	Davos 1999	5km
Gold medal – first place	Davos 1999	10km
Gold medal – first place	Davos 1999	10km double pursuit
Gold medal – first place	Sundsvall 2003	15km
Gold medal – first place	Sundsvall 2003	10km double pursuit
Silver medal – second place	Ylläs 1995	3×5km relay
Silver medal – second place	Sundsvall 2003	15km
Bronze medal – third place	Oslo 1987	3×5km relay
Bronze medal – third place	Banff 1991	3×5km relay
Women's athletics
Representing Norway
Event / 1st / 2nd / 3rd; Summer Deaflympics / 0 / 0 / 1
Summer Deaflympics
Bronze medal – third place	Los Angeles 1985	1500 m

Tone Tangen Myrvoll (born 12 May 1965) is a former Norwegian deaf cross-country skier, orienteer and runner. She has represented Norway in both Summer and Winter Deaflympics from 1985 to 2003 on seven occasions. She has competed at the Summer Deaflympics in 1985 and in 1989 and competed at the Winter Deaflympics in 1987, 1991, 1995, 1999 and in 2003. Tone Tangen Myrvoll initially started her career as orienteer before pursuing her career in cross country skiing. She is regarded as the most successful cross country skier in Deaflympic history with a medal tally of 15 including 11 gold medals. She is also the most successful athlete from Norway to compete at the Deaflympics.

== Career ==
Tone Tangen Myrvoll is profoundly deaf and was eligible to compete at the 1988 European Orienteering Championships among the non deaf athletes. She made her Deaflympic debut during the 1985 Summer Deaflympics and claimed a solitary bronze medal in the women's 1500m event. She also took part at the 1989 Summer Deaflympics and went medalless.

She took up the sport of cross country skiing in 1987 and went onto make her Winter Deaflympics debut in the 1987 edition which was held in her hometown Oslo, capital of Norway. She clinched three medals during the event including two gold medals in women's 5 km and 10 km categories along with a bronze in women's 3×5 km relay event. Following the successful maiden appearance, she went onto dominate in the Winter Deaflympics until the 2003 edition and finished her career with 15 Winter Deaflympic medals and a solitary Summer Deaflympic bronze medal. She was awarded the ICSD Deaf Sportswoman of the Year in 1998 and was nominated for the relevant award on five occasions.

== Cross-country skiing results ==
All results are sourced from the International Ski Federation (FIS).

=== World Cup ===
==== Season standings ====
Season	Age					
Season	Age	Overall	Distance	Long Distance	Middle Distance	Sprint
1997	31	NC	—N/a	NC	—N/a	—
1999	33	NC	—N/a	NC	—N/a	—
2000	34	NC	—N/a	NC	NC	—
2004	38	NC	NC	—N/a	—N/a	—
