= China at the 2019 Winter Deaflympics =

- Flag of China
- IPC code: CHN

in Province of Sondrio, Italy 12 December 2019 – 21 December 2019
- Medals Ranked 6th: Gold 2 Silver 0 Bronze 2 Total 4

Winter Deaflympics appearances (overview)
- 2007; 2015; 2019; 2023

China competed at the 2019 Winter Deaflympics held between 12 and 21 December 2019 in Sondrio Province in Northern Italy. The country finished in 6th place in the medal table with a total of two gold medals and two bronze medals.

== Medalists ==
Medal	Name	Sport	Event	Date
Gold	Men's team	Curling	Men's tournament	20 December
Gold	Women's team	Curling	Women's tournament	20 December
Bronze	Zhao Yueyue	Snowboarding	Women's parallel slalom	14 December
Bronze	Zhang Buchi; Wang Liguo	Cross-country skiing	Team sprint freestyle	18 December

== Cross-country skiing ==
Zhang Buchi and Wang Liguo won the bronze medal in the team sprint freestyle event.

== Curling ==
Both the men's event and women's event were won by China.

== Snowboarding ==
Zhao Yueyue won the bronze medal in the women's parallel slalom event.
