= Austria at the 2019 Winter Deaflympics =

- Flag of Austria

in Province of Sondrio, Italy 12 December 2019 – 21 December 2019
- Medals: Gold 0 Silver 1 Bronze 4 Total 5

Winter Deaflympics appearances (overview)
- 1953; 1955; 1959; 1963; 1967; 1971–1983; 1987; 1991; 1995; 1999; 2003; 2007; 2015; 2019; 2023

Austria competed at the 2019 Winter Deaflympics held between 12 and 21 December 2019 in Sondrio Province in Northern Italy.

== Medalists ==
Medal	Name	Sport	Event	Date
Silver	Lisa Zörweg	Snowboarding	Women's snowboard cross	16 December
Bronze	Lukas Käfer	Alpine skiing	Men's downhill	13 December
Bronze	Melissa Köck	Alpine skiing	Women's alpine combined	14 December
Bronze	Melissa Köck	Alpine skiing	Women's giant slalom	17 December
Bronze	Melissa Köck	Alpine skiing	Women's slalom	18 December

== Alpine skiing ==
Lukas Käfer won the bronze medal in the men's downhill event.

Melissa Köck won the bronze medals in the women's alpine combined, women's giant slalom and women's slalom events.

== Snowboarding ==
Lisa Zörweg won the silver medal in the women's snowboard cross event.
