= Marco Scaramellini =

Italian politician

Mayor of Sondrio
- Incumbent
- Assumed office 26 June 2018
- Preceded by: Alcide Molteni

Personal details
- Born: 15 October 1965 (age 60) Chiavenna, Lombardy, Italy
- Party: Centre-right independent
- Education: Polytechnic University of Milan
- Profession: engineer

Marco Scaramellini (born 15 October 1965) is an Italian politician.

He is a civic and he has served as the Mayor of Sondrio since 26 June 2018.

== See also ==
- 2018 Italian local elections
- List of mayors of Sondrio

Political offices
Preceded by Alcide Molteni	Mayor of Sondrio since 2018	Succeeded by
