= Italy at the 2019 Winter Deaflympics =

- Flag of Italy
- IPC code: ITA

in Province of Sondrio, Italy 12 December 2019 – 21 December 2019
- Medals Ranked 2nd: Gold 5 Silver 0 Bronze 2 Total 7

Winter Deaflympics appearances
- 1949; 1953; 1955; 1959; 1963; 1967; 1971; 1975; 1979; 1983; 1987; 1991; 1995; 1999; 2003; 2007; 2015; 2019; 2023

Italy competed at the 2019 Winter Deaflympics held between 12 and 21 December 2019 in Sondrio Province in Northern Italy. Alpine skier Giacomo Pierbon won gold medals in all five men's alpine skiing events which meant that the country finished in 2nd place in the medal table with a total of five gold medals and two bronze medals.

== Medalists ==
Medal	Name	Sport	Event	Date
Gold	Giacomo Pierbon	Alpine skiing	Men's downhill	13 December
Gold	Giacomo Pierbon	Alpine skiing	Men's alpine combined	14 December
Gold	Giacomo Pierbon	Alpine skiing	Men's Super-G	15 December
Gold	Giacomo Pierbon	Alpine skiing	Men's giant slalom	16 December
Gold	Giacomo Pierbon	Alpine skiing	Men's slalom	17 December
Bronze	Duilio Collutiis	Chess	Men's blitz tournament	13 December
Bronze	Erica Dugnani	Snowboarding	Women's snowboard cross	16 December

== Alpine skiing ==
Giacomo Pierbon won the gold medal in the men's downhill event. He also won the gold medal in the men's alpine combined event.

He went on to win the gold medals in all other men's alpine skiing event as well: the men's Super-G event, the men's giant slalom event and the men's slalom event.

== Chess ==
Duilio Collutiis won the bronze medal in the men's blitz tournament.

== Curling ==
Italy competed in the men's tournament.

== Snowboarding ==
Erica Dugnani won the bronze medal in the women's snowboard cross event.
