= Kazakhstan at the 2019 Winter Deaflympics =

- IOC code: KAZ

in Valtellina, Valchiavenna
- Competitors: 40 in 4 sports
- Medals Ranked 7th: Gold 1 Silver 0 Bronze 0 Total 1

Winter Deaflympics appearances (overview)
- 2015; 2019; 2023

Kazakhstan competed at the 2019 Winter Deaflympics which was held in Valtellina and Valchiavenna, Italy, from December 12 to 21, 2019. Kazakhstan was one of the 34 nations to compete at the multi-sport event. This was the nation's second appearance at the Winter Deaflympics, after making its debut in 2015. It sent a delegation consisting of 40 athletes for the event.

== Medalists ==
Medal	Name	Sport	Event	Date
Gold	Samazhan Kettebekov; Viktor Maksimenko; Amangeldy Nauryzgaliev; Berik Nurymov; Dmitry Mochalsky; Maxim Rozhkov	Chess	Men Team	20 December

== Chess ==
Kazakhstan won the gold medal in the men's team event.

== Ice hockey ==
The women's team was not eligible to compete at the event as the women's ice hockey event was canceled by the organizers and by the International Committee of Sports for the Deaf due to the low number of participants.
