= Poland at the 2019 Winter Deaflympics =

- Flag of Poland
- IPC code: POL

in Province of Sondrio, Italy 12 December 2019 – 21 December 2019
- Medals Ranked 12th: Gold 0 Silver 1 Bronze 1 Total 2

Winter Deaflympics appearances
- 1949; 1953; 1955; 1959; 1963; 1967; 1971; 1975; 1979; 1983; 1987; 1991; 1995; 1999; 2003; 2007; 2015; 2019; 2023

Poland competed at the 2019 Winter Deaflympics held between 12 and 21 December 2019 in Province of Sondrio in Northern Italy. The country won one silver medal and one bronze medal, both in chess. The country finished in 12th place in the medal table.

== Medalists ==
Medal	Name	Sport	Event	Date
Silver	Mateusz Łapaj	Chess	Men Blitz	13 December
Bronze	Monika Kobylińska; Joanna Strześniewska; Izabela Towarnicka; Malwina Szewczyk; Ewa Wardziak; Bożena Krzyszkowiak	Chess	Women Team	20 December

== Chess ==
Mateusz Łapaj won the silver medal in the men's blitz tournament.

The women's team won the bronze medal in the women's tournament.
