= Ukraine at the 2019 Winter Deaflympics =

- Flag of Ukraine

in Province of Sondrio, Italy 12 December 2019 – 21 December 2019
- Medals Ranked 3rd: Gold 4 Silver 4 Bronze 3 Total 11

Winter Deaflympics appearances
- 1949; 1953; 1955; 1959; 1963; 1967; 1971; 1975; 1979; 1983; 1987; 1991; 1995; 1999; 2003; 2007; 2015; 2019; 2023

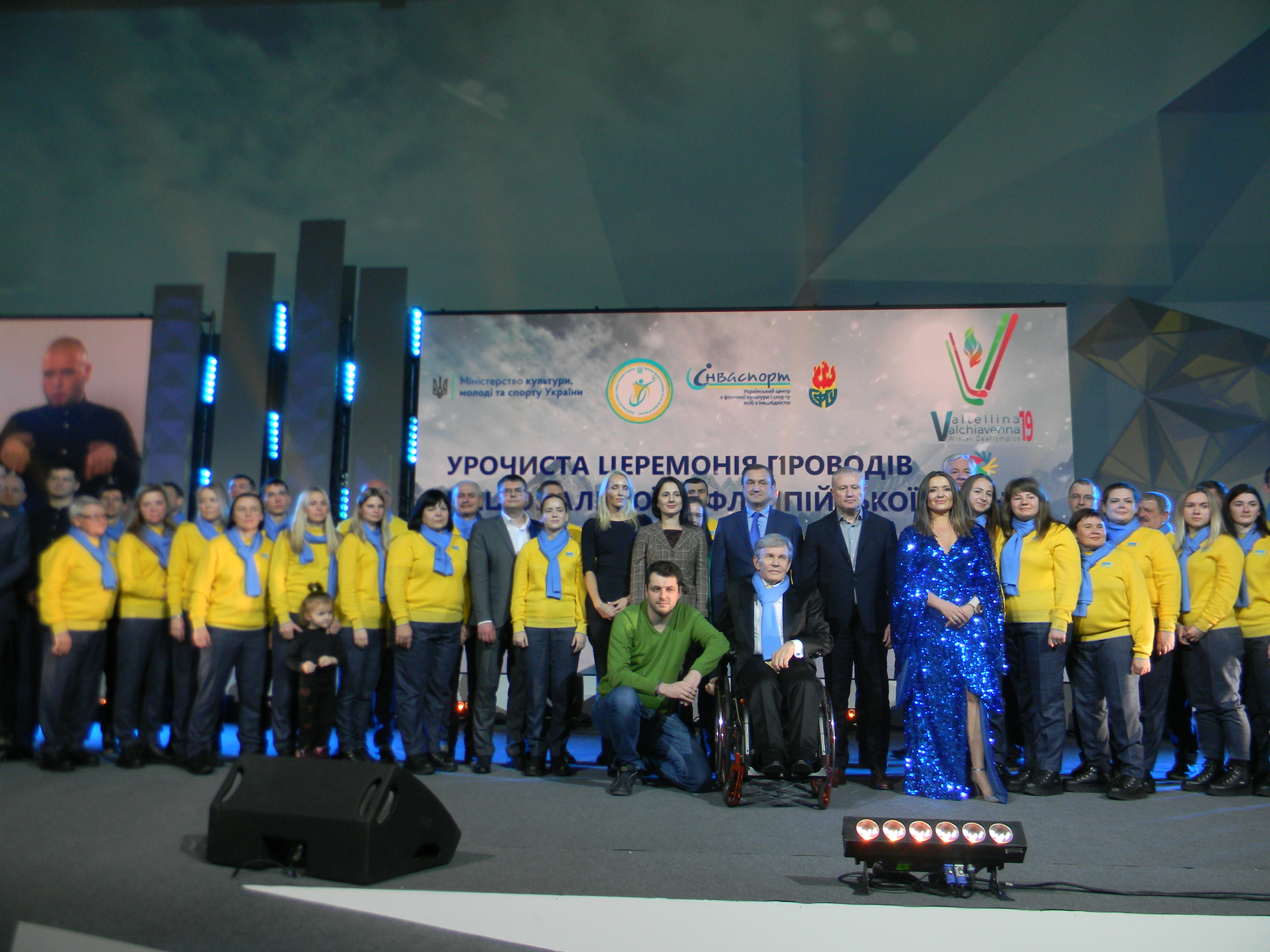
Ukrainian delegation at the 2019 Winter Deaflympics.

Ukraine competed at the 2019 Winter Deaflympics held between 12 and 21 December 2019 in Province of Sondrio in Northern Italy. Most medals were won in cross-country skiing and the country finished in 3rd place in the medal table with a total of four gold medals, four silver medals and three bronze medals.

== Medalists ==
Medal	Name	Sport	Event	Date
Gold	Dmytro Mazhaiev	Cross-country skiing	Men's 10 km free technique	13 December
Gold	Dmytro Mazhaiev	Cross-country skiing	Men's 5 km individual	16 December
Gold	Dmytro Mazhaiev	Cross-country skiing	Men's 10 km pursuit	17 December
Gold	Tatiana Baklanova; Natalya Myronenko; Svitlana Gonchar; Alona Osypova; Alina Lyanguzova; Inga Rudenko	Chess	Women's team tournament	20 December
Silver	Tatiana Baklanova	Chess	Women's blitz tournament	13 December
Silver	Pavlo Mandziuk	Cross-country skiing	Men sprint classic	14 December
Silver	Andriy Andriyishyn	Cross-country skiing	Men's 5 km individual	16 December
Silver	Anastasiia Lavryk; Volodymyr Pyshniak	Cross-country skiing	Team sprint free technique	18 December
Bronze	Yelizaveta Noprienko	Cross-country skiing	Women's 5 km free technique	13 December
Bronze	Ruslan Denysenko	Cross-country skiing	Men's 10 km pursuit	17 December
Bronze	Yelizaveta Noprienko	Cross-country skiing	Women's 3.3 km pursuit	17 December

== Chess ==
Tatiana Baklanova won the silver medal in the women's blitz tournament.

Ukraine also won the gold medal in the women's team tournament.

== Cross-country skiing ==
Pavlo Mandziuk won the silver medal in the men's sprint classic event.

Dmytro Mazhaiev won the gold medal in the men's 10 kilometres pursuit free technique event. Ruslan Denysenko finished in 3rd place in this event. Mazhaiev also won the gold medals in the men's 5 kilometres individual and men's 10 kilometres pursuit events.

Yelizaveta Nopriienko won the bronze medal in the women's 6.6 km pursuit free technique event.

She also won the bronze medal in the women's 5 km free technique event.

== Curling ==
Ukraine competed in both the men's event and women's event.
