= 2011 Winter Deaflympics =

17th Winter Deaflympics

17th Winter Deaflympics
- Host city: Vysoké Tatry, Slovakia
- Nations: 25 countries
- Athletes: 252 athletes
- Events: 30 (5 disciplines)
- Opening: 18 February 2011
- Closing: 26 February 2011

Summer

Winter

The 2011 Winter Deaflympics (Slovak: Zimné Deaflympijské hry 2011), officially known as the 17th Winter Deaflympics (Slovak: 17. Zimná Deaflympiáda) was originally scheduled to be held from 18 February 2011 to 26 February 2011 in Vysoké Tatry, Slovakia. This was the first time that Slovakia was selected to host a Deaflympic event. But the multi-sporting event was cancelled due to the lack of preparations, lack of readiness and reluctance by the Deaflympic Committee of Slovakia prior to the event. The event was also cancelled mainly due to the alleged fraud by the former President of the Deaflympic Committee of Slovakia, Jaromir Ruda. The Winter Games was cancelled and was postponed to 2015, which was the 18th Winter Deaflympics.

== Bidding and organization ==
Vysoke Tatry was selected as the host city for the 17th Winter Deaflympics as a replacement of Vancouver which was approved by the 39th Congress of International Committee of Sports for the Deaf on 4 January 2005 in Australia, Melbourne just before the 2005 Summer Deaflympics. About 438 athletes and 25 countries were estimated to compete in the multi-sport event.

== Crisis and controversies ==
The 2011 Winter Games were also temporarily cancelled by the Comite International des Sports des Sourds on 11 May 2010, due to the delay in arrangements for the commencement of the Winter Games. Apart from the lack of preparations, it was revealed that the President of the Deaflympic Organizing Committee of Slovakia involved in the fraud scam (accused of diverting in excess of 1.7 million euros) relating to the funds which was transferred to the Deaflympic Committee of Slovakia by other national deaf sports federations was misused by the Committee and the President of the Federation. The ICSD filed a criminal complaint against him and against the Committee demanding the reimbursement of the funds in order to cover the hotel accommodations and other relevant expenditures for the arrangement of the multi-sporting event. In 2011 August, Jaromir Ruda was sentenced to 13 years in prison for also involving in 11 other fraud cases. The FIR also resulted in the suspension of the Deaflympic Committee of Slovakia and the ICSD decided to skip the planned Winter Games after the ICSD couldn't able to refund the sufficient funds.

Preceded by 2007 XVI; Salt Lake City, USA	2011; XVII; Vysoké Tatry, Slovakia	Succeeded by 2015 XVIII; Khanty-Mansiysk and Magnitogorsk, Russia
