= Yugra Arena =

Indoor sporting arena in Khanty-Mansiysk, Russia

- Арена Югра
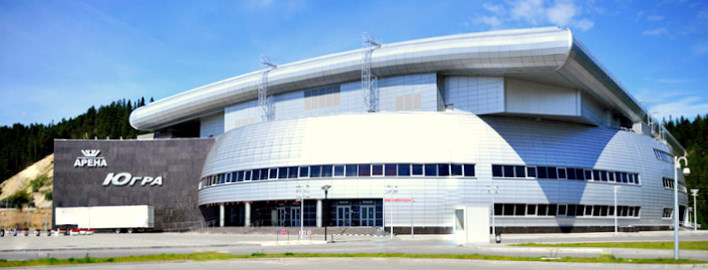
- Interactive map of Yugra Arena
- Full name: Cultural and entertainment complex Yugra Arena
- Location: Khanty-Mansiysk, Russia
- Coordinates: 60°58′42″N 69°00′44″E
- Capacity: 5,500

Construction
- Built: 2008
- Opened: November 2008

Tenant
- Yugra Khanty-Mansiysk (KHL) (2008–present)

Yugra Arena is an indoor sporting arena located in Khanty-Mansiysk, Russia. It is used for various indoor events and is the home arena of the ice hockey team Yugra Khanty-Mansiysk which plays in the Kontinental Hockey League (previously it played in Russian Major League and lower leagues). The capacity of the arena is 5,500 spectators.
