= Canada at the 2019 Winter Deaflympics =

- IPC code: CAN
- NPC: Canadian Deaf Sports Association
- Website: assc-cdsa.com/en/

in Valtellina, Valchiavenna
- Competitors: 34 in 4 sports
- Medals Ranked 13th: Gold 0 Silver 1 Bronze 0 Total 1

Winter Deaflympics appearances
- 1949; 1953; 1955; 1959; 1963; 1967; 1971; 1975; 1979; 1983; 1987; 1991; 1995; 1999; 2003; 2007; 2015; 2019; 2023

Canada competed at the 2019 Winter Deaflympics which were held in Valtellina and Valchiavenna, Italy, from December 12 to 21, 2019. Canada was one of the 34 nations to compete at the multi-sport event. This was the nation's 15th appearance at the Winter Deaflympics, having regularly participated at the event since making its debut in 1953.

In September 2019, the Canadian Deaf Sports Association announced that 35 athletes would represent Canada at the Deaflympics in four sporting events including curling, ice hockey, alpine skiing and snowboarding. In October 2018, former ice hockey player Jim Kyte helped the Canadian team by offering a donation of $2,500 to participate at the 2019 Winter Deaflympics.

== Curling ==
Both men's and women's teams from Canada qualified to compete at the event.

== Ice hockey ==
The Canadian men's deaf ice hockey team announced a squad consisting of 20 players for the event. The women's team was not eligible to compete at the event as the women's ice hockey event was discontinued by the organizers and by the International Committee of Sports for the Deaf due to the low number of participants. Canada received its only medal in the ice hockey event claiming a silver medal conceding a 3–7 defeat to rivals USA.
