= Tereza Kmochová =

Czech deaf alpine skier (born 1990)

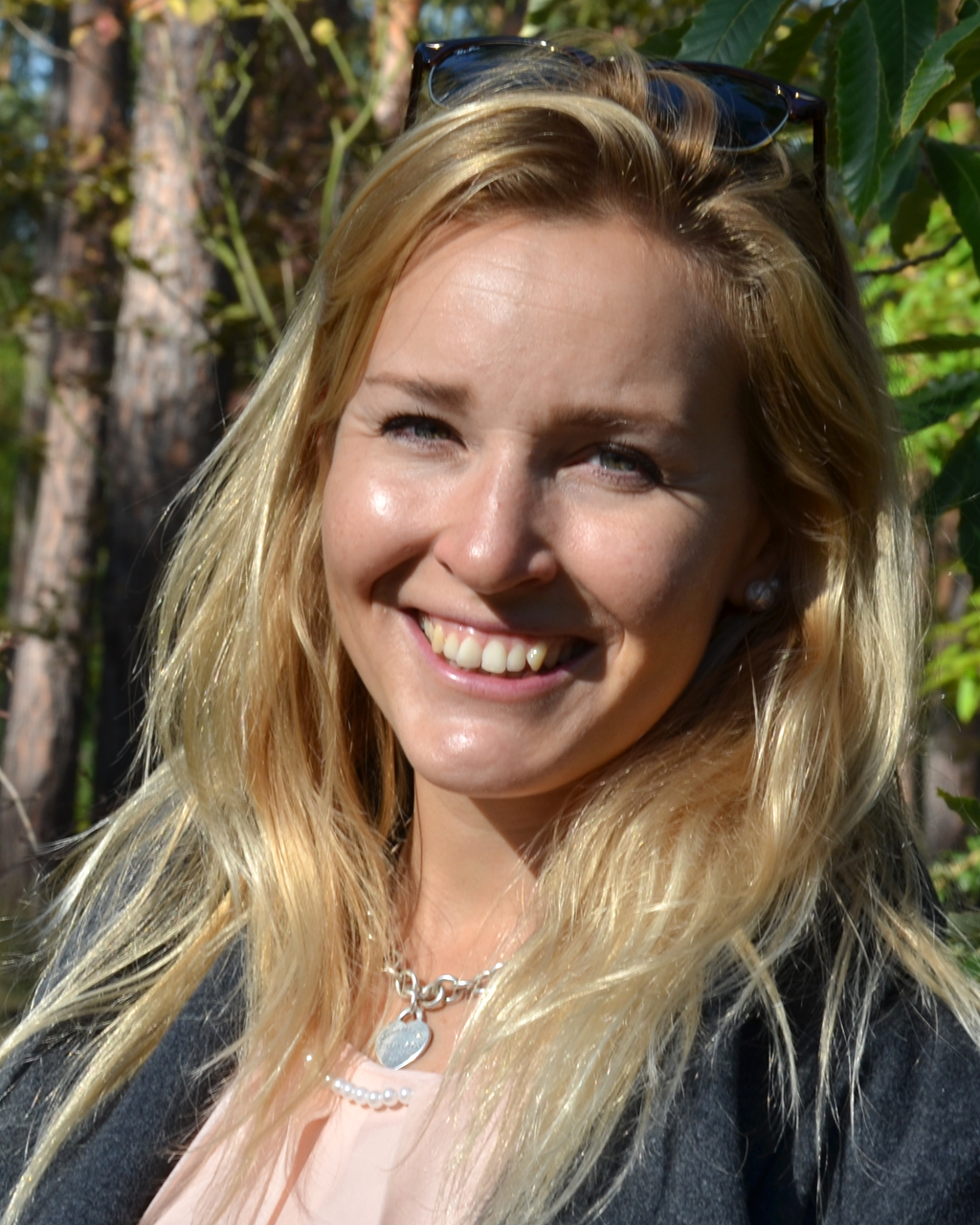
- Kmochová in 2018

Personal information
- Nationality: Czech
- Born: 26 September 1990 (age 36) Prague, Czechoslovakia
- Website: Terezá Kmochova

Sport
- Country: Czech Republic
- Sport: alpine skiing
- Club: Ski Klub Hárrachov
Medal record
Women's alpine skiing
Representing Czech Republic
Event / 1st / 2nd / 3rd; Deaflympics / 8 / 6 / 1
Deaflympics
Gold medal – first place	Salt Lake 2007	Giant slalom
Gold medal – first place	Salt Lake 2007	Downhill
Gold medal – first place	Khanty-Mansiysk 2015	Giant slalom
Gold medal – first place	Khanty-Mansiysk 2015	Super combined
Gold medal – first place	Khanty-Mansiysk 2015	Super-G
Gold medal – first place	Khanty-Mansiysk 2015	Downhill
Gold medal – first place	Khanty-Mansiysk 2015	Slalom
Gold medal – first place	Province of Sondrio 2019	Giant slalom
Silver medal – second place	Salt Lake 2007	Alpine combined
Silver medal – second place	Salt Lake 2007	Slalom
Silver medal – second place	Province of Sondrio 2019	Downhill
Silver medal – second place	Province of Sondrio 2019	Super-G
Silver medal – second place	Province of Sondrio 2019	Slalom
Silver medal – second place	Province of Sondrio 2019	Alpine combined
Bronze medal – third place	Salt Lake 2007	Super-G
Winter Universiade
Gold medal – first place	Almaty 2017	parallel team

Tereza Kmochová (born 26 September 1990) is a Czech deaf female alpine skier. She has represented Czech Republic in Winter Deaflympics, Winter Universiade and in the FIS Alpine World Ski Championships. She generally competes in the women's combined, slalom, giant slalom, Super-G events at international alpine skiing competitions. She is considered one of the finest deaflympic alpine skiers to have competed at the Deaflympics and also regarded as a finest athlete to have represented Czech Republic at the Deaflympics with a record haul of 10 medals including 7 gold medals. In the 2015 Winter Deaflympics she created history after winning gold medals in all five events such as giant slalom, super combined, slalom, downhill and Super-G.

Tereza Kmochová was awarded the ICSD Deaf Sportswoman of the Year award in 2015 for her achievements in the sport of alpine skiing especially claiming five gold medals during the 2015 Winter Deaflympics which was held in Russia.

Despite her deafness, she was eligible to represent Czech Republic in the 2015 Winter Universiade, 2017 Winter Universiade, FIS Alpine World Ski Championships 2011 and FIS Alpine World Ski Championships 2017. Tereza Kmochova was also the part of the Czech delegation which clinched the gold medal in the Parallel mixed alpine skiing team event during the 2017 Winter Universiade.
