= 2003 Winter Deaflympics =

International sports event for deaf people

15th Winter Deaflympics
- Host city: Sundsvall, Sweden
- Nations: 21 countries
- Athletes: 247 athletes
- Events: 23 (4 disciplines)
- Opening: 28 February 2003
- Closing: 8 March 2003

Summer

Winter

The 2003 Winter Deaflympics (Swedish: 2003 Vinterdeaflympics) officially known as the 15th Winter Deaflympics (Swedish: 15: e Vinterdeaflympics) is an international multi-sport event that was held from 28 February 2003 to 8 March 2003. The event was hosted by Sundsvall, Sweden.

Curling competitions were also introduced for the first time in this Winter Deaflympics.

The logo for the 15th Winter Deaflympics symbolises the fire from the torch.

== Medal tally ==
Preceded by 1999 XIV; Davos, Switzerland	2003; XV; Sundsvall, Sweden	Succeeded by 2007 XVI; Salt Lake City, USA
