= 2015 Winter Deaflympics =

18th Winter Deaflympics

18th Winter Deaflympics
- Host city: Khanty-Mansiysk; Magnitogorsk; Russia
- Motto: Let’s give a voice to our sport success
- Nations: 27 countries
- Athletes: 336 athletes
- Events: 31 in 5 sports
- Opening: 28 March 2015
- Closing: 5 April 2015
- Opened by: Vitaly Mutko

Winter

Summer

The 2015 Winter Deaflympics (Russian: Зимние Сурдлимпийские игры 2015 года), officially known as the 18th Winter Deaflympics (Russian: 18-е зимние сурдлимпийские игры), is an international multi-sport event that took place in Khanty-Mansiysk and Magnitogorsk, Russia from 28 March to 5 April 2015.

== Venues ==
Spartak, the mascot.

Sport	Venue	Location
Alpine skiing (all except Slalom)	Alpine skiing Centre "Metallurg – Magnitogorsk"	Magnitogorsk
Cross-country skiing	Winter Sports Center n.a. A.V. Filipenko	Khanty-Mansiysk
Curling	Ice Palace	Khanty-Mansiysk
Ice Hockey	Arena Ugra	Khanty-Mansiysk
Alpine skiing (Slalom), Snowboarding	Alpine skiing Complex "Khvoyny Urman"	Khanty-Mansiysk

== Logo ==
The games' logo is an abstract of a black grouse that symbolizes the wealth of khanti culture which resembles a hand of a man, the main device for communication of deaf and hard-of-hearing athletes and a bird. It consists of 4 colors which are red and orange that mean motion and energy and blue and violet that mean firmness and endurance. The ethnical ornament of khanti “hare’s ears” which is used in household items and clothes of khanti and mansi in the middle of the logo symbolizes motion. Overall, the logo represents host city, Khanty-Mansiysk as a confluence of two great rivers – Ob and Irtysh.

== Mascot ==
The games' mascot is a baby mammoth, a symbol of Russian north that represents beauty and strength of Siberia and is described to have kind eyes crystal clear like rivers and lakes of Ugra and open as Russian soul. The name of the mascot was chosen as "Spartak" from an online voting process.

== Participating nations ==
- Armenia
- Austria
- Canada
- China
- Croatia
- Czech Republic
- Estonia
- Finland
- France
- Germany
- Hungary
- Italy
- Japan
- Kazakhstan
- South Korea
- Mongolia
- Norway
- Pakistan
- Poland
- Russia
- Slovenia
- Slovakia
- Spain
- Switzerland
- Turkey
- Ukraine
- United States

== Schedule ==
OC	Opening ceremony	●	Event competitions	1	Gold medal events	CC	Closing ceremony

March/April	28th Sat	29th Sun	30th Mon	31st Tue	1st Wed	2nd Thu	3rd Fri	4th Sat	5th Sun	Events
Ceremonies	OC								CC	—N/a
Alpine skiing					2		4	2	2	10
Cross-country skiing		2	1		2	1		2		8
Curling		●	●	●	●	●	●	●	2	2
Ice hockey		●	●		●	●		●	1	1
Snowboarding		2	2		2		2		2	10
Daily medal events		4	3	0	6	1	6	4	7	31
Cumulative total		4	7	7	13	14	20	24	31	31
March/April	28th Sat	29th Sun	30th Mon	31st Tue	1st Wed	2nd Thu	3rd Fri	4th Sat	5th Sun	Events

== Medal table ==
* Host nation (Russia)

Rank	Nation	Gold	Silver	Bronze	Total
1	Russia (RUS)*	12	6	12	30
2	Czech Republic (CZE)	6	1	0	7
3	United States (USA)	3	3	2	8
4	Italy (ITA)	3	2	0	5
5	Japan (JPN)	3	1	1	5
6	Switzerland (SUI)	1	3	0	4
7	France (FRA)	1	1	3	5
8	China (CHN)	1	1	2	4
9	Finland (FIN)	1	1	0	2
10	Ukraine (UKR)	0	5	3	8
11	Austria (AUT)	0	4	5	9
12	Canada (CAN)	0	2	1	3
13	Norway (NOR)	0	1	0	1
14	Germany (GER)	0	0	1	1
14	Slovenia (SLO)	0	0	1	1
Totals (15 entries)		31	31	31	93

== Results ==
=== Alpine skiing ===
Event	Gold	Silver	Bronze
Men Downhill	Philipp Steiner; Switzerland	Giacomo Pierbon; Italy	Philipp Eisenmann; Germany
Women Downhill	Tereza Kmochová; Czech Republic	Veronika Grygarová; Czech Republic	Anja Drev; Slovenia
Men Super Combined	Giacomo Pierbon; Italy	Philipp Steiner; Switzerland	Thomas Luxcey; France
Women Super Combined	Tereza Kmochová; Czech Republic	Melissa Kock; Austria	Beatrice Brunnbauer; Austria
Men Super-G	Giacomo Pierbon; Italy	Philipp Steiner; Switzerland	Nicolas Sarremejane; France
Women Super-G	Tereza Kmochová; Czech Republic	Melissa Kock; Austria	Beatrice Brunnbauer; Austria
Men Giant Slalom	Nicolas Sarremejane; France	Giacomo Pierbon; Italy	Christoph Lebelhuber; Austria
Women Giant Slalom	Tereza Kmochová; Czech Republic	Melissa Kock; Austria	Beatrice Brunnbauer; Austria
Men Slalom	Giacomo Pierbon; Italy	Thomas Luxcey; France	David Pelletier; France
Women Slalom	Tereza Kmochová; Czech Republic	Melissa Kock; Austria	Kristina Kock; Austria

=== Cross Country skiing ===
Event	Gold	Silver	Bronze
Men 10 km + 10 km Skiathlon	Vladimir Mayorov; Russia	Andriy Andriyishyn; Ukraine	Pavlo Mandziuk; Ukraine
Women 10 km Mass Start	Anna Fedulova; Russia	Lyubov Misharina; Russia	Raisa Golovina; Russia
Women 5 km + 5 km Skiathlon	Anna Fedulova; Russia	Lyubov Misharina; Russia	Raisa Golovina; Russia
Men Sprint Free	Alexey Groshev; Russia	Pavlo Mandziuk; Ukraine	Volodymyr Pyshniak; Ukraine
Women Sprint Free	Anna Fedulova; Russia	Lyubov Misharina; Russia	Alisa Pyshniak; Ukraine
Men 15 km Mass Start	Vladimir Mayorov; Russia	Andriy Andriyishyn; Ukraine	Sergey Ermilov; Russia
Men 3x10km Relay	Russia (RUS); Sergey Ermilov, Alexey Groshev, Vladimir Mayorov	Ukraine (UKR); Andriy Andriyishyn, Pavlo Mandziuk, Volodymyr Pyshniak	China (CHN); Ren Jianchao, Wang Liguo, Zhang Xiaokun
Men team sprint classic	Russia (RUS); Sergey Ermilov, Vladimir Mayorov	Ukraine (UKR); Andriy Andriyishyn, Volodymyr Pyshniak	China (CHN); Ren Jianchao, Zhang Xiaokun

=== Curling ===
==== Men ====
Round-robin

Key
Teams to playoffs
Teams to tiebreaker

Country	W	L
China	8	0
Canada	6	2
Switzerland	6	2
Russia	4	4
Japan	4	4
Ukraine	3	5
South Korea	2	6
United States	2	6
Hungary	1	7

Tiebreaker

Russia 7 : 6 Japan

Playoff

Semifinals
4 April
China	5
Russia	4
4 April
Canada	8
Switzerland	4

Gold medal
5 April
China	7
Canada	6
Bronze medal
5 April
Russia	11
Switzerland	3

==== Women ====
Round-robin

Key
Teams to playoffs

Country	W	L
Canada	6	1
Croatia	5	2
Russia	5	2
China	5	2
Hungary	4	3
South Korea	2	5
Ukraine	1	6
Slovakia	0	7

Playoff

Semifinals
4 April
China	9
Canada	4
4 April
Croatia	2
Russia	8

Gold medal
5 April
China	5
Russia	9
Bronze medal
5 April
Canada	10
Croatia	5

==== Medalists ====
Event	Gold	Silver	Bronze
Men's team	China (CHN); Ge Shun Hai, Guan Jiquan, Li Haidong, Yang Li Guo, Yang Yan Chao	Canada (CAN); Joseph Comte, Marc Comte, Shawn Demianyk, John Gessner, David Morton	Russia (RUS); Oleg Darchiev, Denis Draga, Yury Makeev, Alexander Pyatkov
Women's team	Russia (RUS); Tatiana Karpushenkova, Elena Shagieva, Yulia Tretiakova, Svetlana Tsedik, Olga Yaroslavtsena	China (CHN); Li Hong, Wang Ming Ming, Yang Xue, Yin Yu, Zhao Lingyan	Canada (CAN); Brenda Davidson, Sally Korol, Donna Mcleod, Sarah Rabu, Sylvia Sigurdson

=== Ice hockey ===
Event	Gold	Silver	Bronze
Men's team	Russia (RUS); Dmitry Arsenyev; Sergey Berlizov; Roman Chernov; Oleg Danilenko; Dmitrii Dernov; Pavel Evtushenko; Rustam Gafurbaev; Konstantin Gamayurov; Stanislav Ilichev; Yuriy Izmaylov; Vyacheslav Kazantsev; Orkhan Kazimov; Stanislav Khakimov; Sergey Kikin; Alexey Kulikovskiy; Roman Lukianov; Vladimir Mashkov; Vadim Mazurskii; Vitalii Mokhov; Andrey Prudnikov; Ilya Shevtsov; Artur Shimarov; Viacheslav Sidorov; Dmitrii Yadryshnikov; Sergey Yushkin	Canada (CAN); Ryan Chramtchenko; Steven Devine; Patrick Escalambre; Christopher Garbacz; Ryan Howich; Andrew Hughes; Owen Hunter; John Kyte; Thomas Kyte; Cole Laing; Graeme Lauersen; Jonathan Lobodzinski; Jesse Mcintyre; Scott Nelson; Tyler Plett; Matthew Sheffield; Dimitrios Theofilaktidis	United States (USA); Troy Benson; Joseph Bingham; Christian Buczek; Jameson Crane III; Tyler Devore; Max Finley; Garrett Gintoli; Peter Gintoli; Samuel Holzrichter; Grant Isenbarger; Joseph Lingle; Tomas Oricchto; Robert Ruef; Derek Struwing

=== Snowboarding ===
Event	Gold	Silver	Bronze
Men Parallel Slalom	Noboru Harada; Japan	Roman Khamitsevich; Russia	Igor Ishatenko; Russia
Men Half-pipe	Blair Tucker Esson; United States	Sean Esson; United States	Yasutomo Tsukui; Japan
Men Giant Slalom	Noboru Harada; Japan	Alexey Ignatenko; Russia	Roman Khamitsevich; Russia
Men Snowboard Cross	Tomáš Pazdera; Czech Republic	Blair Tucker Esson; United States	Alexey Ignatenko; Russia
Men Snowboard Slopestyle	Blair Tucker Esson; United States	Jonas Jenzer; Switzerland	Sean Esson; United States
Women Half-pipe	Ryoko Hanashima; Japan	Mayako Okawa; Japan	Svetlana Anisimova; Russia
Women Snowboard Cross	Ella Shevlyakova; Russia	Lauren Weibert; United States	Svetlana Anisimova; Russia
Women Snowboard Slopestyle	Lauren Weibert; United States	Petrine Olgeirdottir; Norway	Svetlana Anisimova; Russia
Women Giant Slalom	Maria Kapustkina; Russia	Cecilia Hanhikoski; Finland	Anna Surmilina; Russia
Women Parallel Slalom	Cecilia Hanhikoski; Finland	Maria Kapustkina; Russia	Anna Surmilina; Russia

Preceded by 2011 XVII; Vysoké Tatry, Slovakia	2015 Winter Deaflympics; XVIII; Khanty-Mansiysk, Russian Federation	Succeeded by 2019 XIX; Sondrio Province
