= 2007 Winter Deaflympics =

16th Winter Deaflympics

16th Winter Deaflympics
- Host city: Salt Lake City, United States
- Nations: 23 countries
- Athletes: 298 athletes
- Events: 27 (5 disciplines)
- Opening: 3 Feb 2007
- Closing: 10 Feb 2007

Summer

Winter

The 2007 Winter Deaflympics, officially known as the 16th Winter Deaflympics, is an international multi-sport event that was held from 3 to 10 February 2007 in Salt Lake City, United States.

== Sports ==
Curling has been recognized as an official sport.

- Curling (2) ()
- Ice hockey (1) ()
- Skiing
  - Alpine skiing (10) ()
  - Cross-country skiing (9) ()
  - Snowboarding (5) ()

== Results ==
https://www.deaflympics.com/games/2007-w/results

== Medal table ==
* Host nation (United States)

Rank	Nation	Gold	Silver	Bronze	Total
1	Russia (RUS)	9	5	4	18
2	Czech Republic (CZE)	4	3	2	9
3	United States (USA)*	3	5	5	13
4	Canada (CAN)	3	1	0	4
5	Japan (JPN)	3	0	1	4
6	Germany (GER)	2	1	0	3
7	Switzerland (SUI)	1	4	2	7
8	Austria (AUT)	1	2	2	5
9	Finland (FIN)	1	1	1	3
10	Ukraine (UKR)	0	4	3	7
11	Italy (ITA)	0	1	2	3
12	Slovenia (SLO)	0	1	1	2
13	China (CHN)	0	0	1	1
13	Croatia (CRO)	0	0	1	1
13	Sweden (SWE)	0	0	1	1
13	Turkey (TUR)	0	0	1	1
Totals (16 entries)		27	28	27	82

== Nations ==
Countries participated:

Country / Men / Women / Total

1. Australia 1 0 1
2. Austria 8 1 9
3. Canada 28 7 35
4. China 11 3 14
5. Croatia 0 6 6
6. Czech Republic 0 4 4
7. Finland 25 1 26
8. France 1 0 1
9. Germany 19 2 21
10. Italy 5 5 10
11. Japan 12 5 17
12. Lithuania 1 0 1
13. Netherlands 0 1 1
14. Pakistan 1 0 1
15. Poland 1 1 2
16. Russia 29 5 34
17. Slovakia 4 7 11
18. Slovenia 1 1 2
19. Sweden 25 0 25
20. Switzerland 10 3 13
21. Turkey 4 0 4
22. Ukraine 5 3 8
23. United States 39 13 52

Total 230 68 298

== See also ==
- 2002 Winter Olympics
- 2002 Winter Paralympics

Preceded by 2003 XV; Sundavall, Sweden	2007; XVI; Salt Lake City, USA	Succeeded by 2011 XVII; Vysoké Tatry, Slovakia
