= 2019 Winter Deaflympics =

19th Winter Deaflympics, Province of Sondrio 2019

19th Winter Deaflympics
- Official logo
- Host city: Province of Sondrio; Italy
- Motto: We Need a Chance
- Nations: 34
- Athletes: 485 (362 men and 123 women)
- Events: 36 in 6 sports
- Opening: 12 December 2019
- Closing: 21 December 2019
- Opened by: Marco Scaramellini

Winter

Summer

The relief map of Italy

The 2019 Winter Deaflympics (Italian: 2019 Olimpiadi invernali per non udenti), officially known as the 19th Winter Deaflympics or XIX Winter Deaflympics (Italian: 19° Olimpiadi invernali per sordi), was the 19th edition of the Winter Deaflympics, and took place between the 12–21 December in Sondrio Province in Northern Italy. The opening ceremony was held in Sondrio on 12 December and curling competition began a day prior to the start of the Winter Deaflympics. Sporting events apart from curling commenced on 13 December.

36 events took place in 6 sports: alpine skiing, chess, cross-country skiing, curling, ice hockey, and snowboarding. Initially 32 sporting events were slated to be held but three more events were added to the competition by the organisers due to the inclusion of chess, which was a surprise move. Chess made its debut at the 2019 Winter Deaflympics.

The 19th Deaflympics were the second time Italy hosted the event, previously hosting the 1983 games in Madonna di Campiglio. The Deaflympics was organised by the Federazione Sport Sordi Italia, the national deaf sports federation in Italy, affiliated with the International Committee of Sports for the Deaf.

== Background ==
The hosting of the event raised concerns in May 2018 following the house arrest of former ICSD President Valery Rukhledev on 23 May 2018, regarding the embezzlement of $803,800 from the All-Russian Society of the Deaf while he was serving as the post of the society as well as the post of ICSD President. Valery Rukhledev later stepped down from the position on 31 July 2018 and he later replaced by Australian Rebecca Adam for the ICSD Presidential position on 1 August 2018 causing further controversy as top Deaf sports movements criticised the appointment of Rebecca Adam without proper consent and approval.

On 13 September 2018, on a press release, the newly appointed ICSD President Rebecca Adam confirmed that the Winter Deaflympic event would take place as planned and scheduled during December 2019.

== Bidding ==
It was revealed that in around 2017, former ICSD President Valery Rukhledev had encouraged and requested an application for Almaty, Kazakhstan, after the successful 2017 Winter Universiade held at the city. However Almaty had not submitted its application to host Winter Deaflympics and instead Italy was chosen as the host country.

After the ousting of Valery Rukhledev, on 14 June 2018, the ICSD and FSSI had a meeting and unanimously agreed to support to stage the 2019 Winter Deaflympics in Italy, despite the crisis in the administration of ICSD which started from May 2018.

== The Games ==
=== Opening ceremony ===
The opening ceremony was held on 12 December 2019. The event was officially opened by the Sondrio Province mayor Marco Scaramellini and Italian singer Silvia Mezzanotte sung the national anthem of host country, Italy. Former three time alpine skiing Olympic gold medalist Deborah Compagnoni was invited as special guest during the opening ceremony.

=== Venues ===
Three venues were selected to host the sporting events. Santa Caterina di Valfurva hosts three sporting disciplines such as alpine skiing, snowboarding and cross-country skiing. Madesimo hosts curling competitions while Chiavenna was chosen to host ice hockey and chess events.

Venue	Location	Sport
Deborah Compagnoni track	Santa Caterina di Valfurva	Alpine skiing
Rifugio Bellavista	Santa Caterina di Valfurva	Snowboarding
Pista Sci di Fondo Ski Stadium	Santa Caterina di Valfurva	Cross-country skiing
Valchiavenna sports center	Chiavenna	Ice hockey
Hotel Aurora	Chiavenna	Chess
Circolo Sciatori	Madesimo	Curling

== Participating nations ==
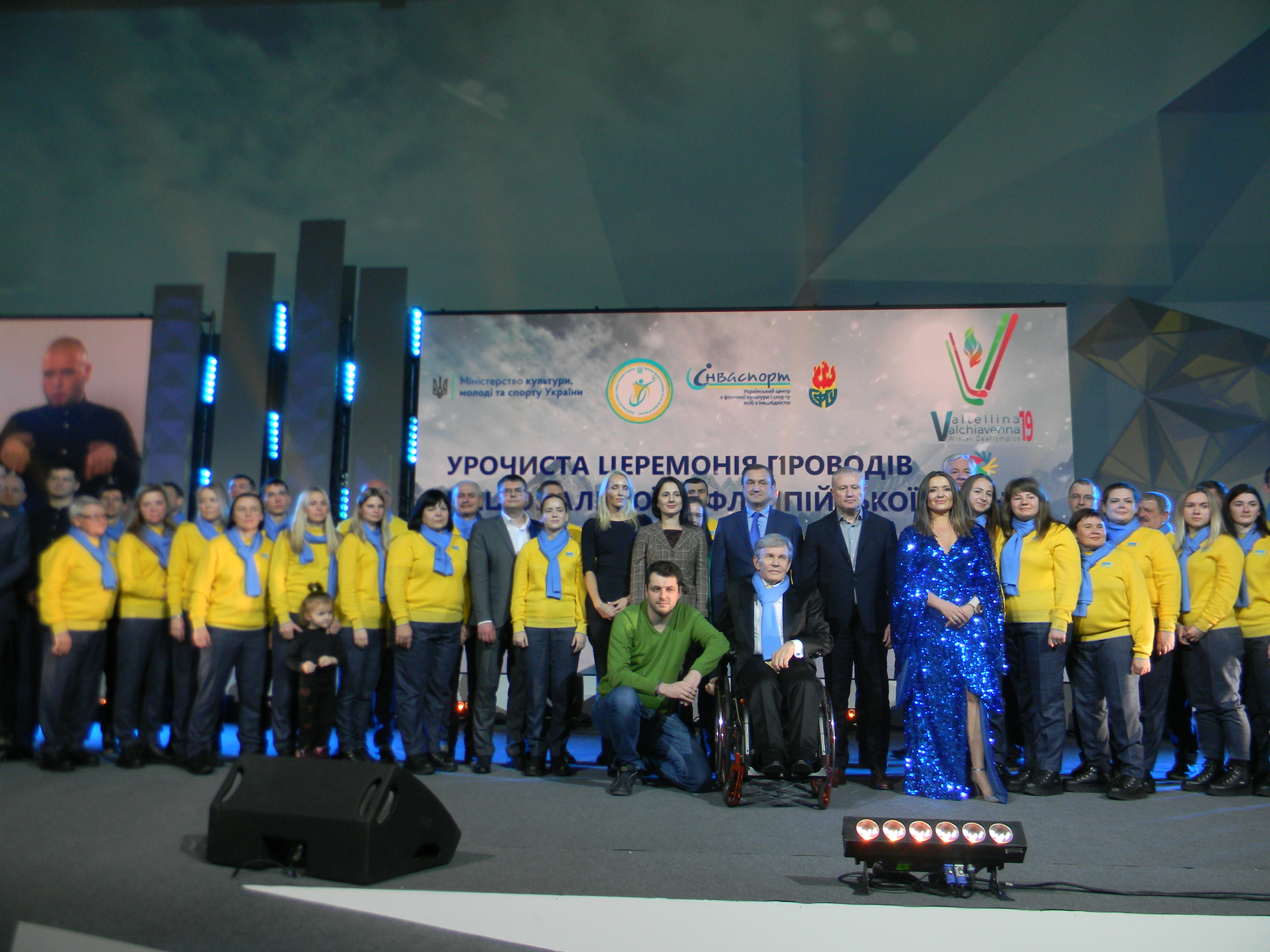
The Ukrainian contingent for the 2019 Winter Deaflympics

- Austria (9)
- Belarus (12)
- Bosnia and Herzegovina (6)
- Brazil (5)
- Bulgaria (6)
- Canada (34)
- China (37)
- Croatia (12)
- Czech Republic (8)
- Finland (27)
- France (2)
- Germany (10)
- Hungary (11)
- India (12)
- Israel (1)
- Italy (16)
- Japan (11)
- Kazakhstan (40)
- Mongolia (5)
- Nepal (2)
- Norway (4)
- Pakistan (1)
- Poland (21)
- Russia (78)
- Slovakia (3)
- Slovenia (1)
- South Korea (14)
- Spain (1)
- Sweden (4)
- Switzerland (7)
- Turkey (3)
- Ukraine (34)
- United States (42)
- Uzbekistan (6)

== Sports ==
The 2019 Winter Deaflympics featured 36 events over 6 sports. Chess was the only new event, and all other sporting events which were part of the 2015 edition were retained. The original idea was that there was a women's ice hockey tournament, but the International Committee of Sports for the Deaf has cancelled the event due to the low number of countries registered on it.

- Chess (4)
- Curling (2)
- Ice hockey (1)

- Skiing
  - Alpine skiing (10)
  - Cross-country skiing (9)
  - Snowboarding (10)

== Calendar ==
OC	Opening ceremony	●	Event competitions	1	Gold medal events	CC	Closing ceremony

December	11th Wed	12th Thu	13th Fri	14th Sat	15th Sun	16th Mon	17th Tue	18th Wed	19th Thu	20th Fri	21st Sat	Events
Ceremonies		OC									CC	—N/a
Alpine skiing			2	2	2		2	2				10
Chess			2	●	●	●	●		●	2		4
Cross-country skiing			2	2		2	2	1				9
Curling	●	●	●	●	●	●	●	●	●	2		2
Ice hockey			●	●	●		●	●	●	●	1	1
Snowboarding			2	2		2		2	2			10
Daily medal events			8	6	2	4	4	5	2	4	1	36
Cumulative total			8	14	16	20	24	29	31	35	36	36
December	11th Wed	12th Thu	13th Fri	14th Sat	15th Sun	16th Mon	17th Tue	18th Wed	19th Thu	20th Fri	21st Sat	Events

== Medal table ==
* Host nation (Italy)

Rank	Nation	Gold	Silver	Bronze	Total
1	Russia (RUS)	18	18	14	50
2	Italy (ITA)*	5	0	2	7
3	Ukraine (UKR)	4	4	3	11
4	United States (USA)	3	1	2	6
5	Czech Republic (CZE)	2	4	1	7
6	China (CHN)	2	0	2	4
7	Israel (ISR)	1	0	0	1
7	Kazakhstan (KAZ)	1	0	0	1
9	France (FRA)	0	3	2	5
10	Finland (FIN)	0	2	1	3
11	Austria (AUT)	0	1	4	5
12	Poland (POL)	0	1	1	2
13	Canada (CAN)	0	1	0	1
13	Germany (GER)	0	1	0	1
15	Croatia (CRO)	0	0	3	3
16	South Korea (KOR)	0	0	1	1
Totals (16 entries)		36	36	36	108

Preceded by 2015 Khanty-Mansiysk	Winter Deaflympic Games; Sondrio Province; XIX Winter Deaflympics (2019)	Succeeded by 2024 Erzurum
