= Sonu Anand Sharma =

Indian badminton player

Personal information
- Born: 8 March 1975 (age 51) New Delhi, Delhi, India

Sport
- Country: India
- Sport: Badminton
Medal record
Representing India
Women's badminton
Deaflympics
Gold medal – first place	Copenhagen 1997	team

Sonu Anand Sharma (born 8 March 1975) is a former Indian deaf badminton player. She has represented India at the Deaflympics twice in 1997 and in 2009. She is married to Mr. Somesh Sharma, who is a national level cricketer and having two kids Somya Sharma and Saksham Sharma

In March 2019, coinciding with the International Women's Day and coincidentally on her 46th birthday anniversary she was honored by the Delhi government and Delhi Commission for Women society as one of the recipients of the Nari Shakti award. She also became the first deaf woman to receive the relevant prestigious award.

== Career ==
Sonu Anand Sharma made her Deaflympic debut during the 1997 Summer Deaflympics and claimed a gold medal in the mixed team event which also included other prominent players Rajeev Bagga and Rohit Bhaker. She also took part at the 2009 Summer Deaflympics and went medalless. After her retirement from playing badminton in international and domestic level, she joined as one of the members of the International Committee of Sports for the Deaf. She also served as one of the coaches of the badminton team representing India at the 2017 Summer Deaflympics.

== See also ==
- India at the Deaflympics
