= Deaf sports =

Deaf sports can refer to:

- Deaf Sports Australia
- Deaf Sports New Zealand
- Malaysian Deaf Sports Association
- South African Deaf Sports Federation
- Turkish Deaf Sport Federation
