= Uganda at the Deaflympics =

- IPC code: UGA
- NPC: Uganda National Paralympic Committee
- Medals: Gold 0 Silver 0 Bronze 0 Total 0

Summer appearances
- 1997

Uganda competed at one edition of the Deaflympics: the 1997 Summer Deaflympics held in Copenhagen, Denmark. The country sent a delegation of twelve athletes (eleven men and one woman) and did not win any medals.

The country has not yet competed at the Winter Deaflympics.

== Medal tallies ==
=== Summer Deaflympics ===
Year	Gold	Silver	Bronze	Total
1997	0	0	0	0
