= Janet Watt =

New Zealand badminton player

Personal information
- National team: New Zealand
- Born: 23 March 1952 (age 74)

Sport
- Sport: Badminton
Medal record
Women's Badminton
Representing New Zealand
Deaflympics
Gold medal – first place	1985 Los Angeles	Women's doubles

Janet Watt (born 23 March 1952) is a former New Zealand female badminton player. She represented New Zealand at the 1985 Summer Deaflympics held in Los Angeles and she won the gold medal in the Women's doubles badminton event along with Carolyn Hamilin.
