= List of sports governing bodies in Turkey =

Following is a list of sports governing bodies in Turkey. All sport federations in Turkey are organized under the governmental agency, Youth and Sport Administration (Turkish: Gençlik ve Spor Genel Müdürlüğü, GSGM), which is the highest umbrella organization for sports.

Body	Official site
Turkish Amateur Sports Federation	www.tosf.gov.tr
Turkish Archery Federation	www.turkisharchery.org
Turkish Athletic Federation	www.taf.org.tr
Turkish Automobile Sports Federation	www.tosfed.org.tr
Turkey Badminton Federation	www.badminton.gov.tr
Turkish Baseball Softball American Football and Rugby Federation	www.tbsf.org.tr
Turkish Basketball Federation	www.tbf.org.tr
Turkish Billiards Federation	www.bilardo.gov.tr
Turkish Bodybuilding and Arm Wrestling Federation	
Turkish Blind Sport Federation	www.gesf.org.tr
Turkish Bobsleigh and Luge Federation	www.kizak.gov.tr
Turkish Bocce Bowling Dart Federation	www.tbbdf.gov.tr
Turkish Boxing Federation	www.turkboks.gov.tr
Turkish Bridge Federation	www.tbricfed.org.tr
Turkish Canoe Federation	www.turkaf.org.tr
Turkish Chess Federation	www.tsf.org.tr
Turkish Curling Federation	www.curling.gov.tr
Turkish Cycling Federation	www.bisikletfederasyonu.gov.tr
Turkish Dancesport Federation	www.tdsf.gov.tr
Turkish Deaf Sport Federation	www.sessizler.org
Turkish Physically Disabled Sports Federation	www.tbesf.org.tr
Turkish Equestrian Federation	www.binicilik.org.tr
Turkish Fencing Federation	www.eskrim.org.tr
Turkish Folk Dances Federation	www.thof.gov.tr
Turkish Football Federation	www.tff.org
Turkish Golf Federation	www.tgf.org.tr
Turkish Gymnastic Federation	www.turkcimfed.org
Turkey Handball Federation	www.thf.gov.tr
Turkish Hockey Federation	www.turkhokey.gov.tr
Turkish Ice Hockey Federation	www.tbhf.org.tr
Turkish Ice Skating Federation	www.buzpateni.org.tr
Turkish Judo and Kurash Federation	www.judo.gov.tr
Turkish Karate Federation	www.karate.gov.tr
Turkish Kick Boxing Federation	www.turkiyekickboksfed.gov.tr
Turkish Korfball Federation	www.korfbol.com
Turkiye Modern Pentathlon Federation	www.mpf.org.tr
Turkish Motorcycling Federations	www.tmf.org.tr
Turkish Mountaineering Federations	www.tdf.org.tr
Turkish Muay Thai Federations	www.muaythai.gov.tr
Turkish Orienteering Federation	www.oryantiring.org
Turkish Rowing Association	www.tkf.gov.tr
Turkish Sailing Federation	www.tyf.org.tr
Scouting and Guiding Federation of Turkey	www.tif.org.tr
Turkish Soaring Federation	www.tyyf.org
Turkish Shooting and Hunting Federation	www.taf.gov.tr
Turkey Ski Federation	www.kayak.org.tr
Turkish Federation of Sport for All	www.his.gov.tr
Turkish Federation of Sport for Athletes with Intellectual Disability	www.tossfed.org.tr
Turkish Swimming Federation	www.tyf.gov.tr
Turkish Table Tennis Federation	www.tmtf.gov.tr
Turkey Taekwondo Federation	www.turkiyetaekwondofed.gov.tr
Turkish Tennis Federation	www.ttf.org.tr
Turkish Traditional Sport Branches Federation	www.gelenekselfed.gov.tr
Turkish Triathlon Sport Branches Federation	www.triatlon.org.tr
Turkish Underwater Sports Federation	www.tssf.gov.trwater
Turkish University Sports Federation	www.univspor.org.tr
Turkish Volleyball Federation	www.voleybol.org.tr
Turkish Water Polo Federation	www.sutopu.gov.tr
Turkey Weightlifting Federation	www.halter.gov.tr
Turkish Wrestling Federation	www.tgf.gov.tr
Turkish Wushu Federation	www.twf.org.tr
World Martial Arts Federation	www.dmsf.org.tr

== See also ==
- Sport in Turkey
