= Shen Yan-ru =

Taiwanese badminton player (born 1998)

Shen Yan-ru 沈彥汝
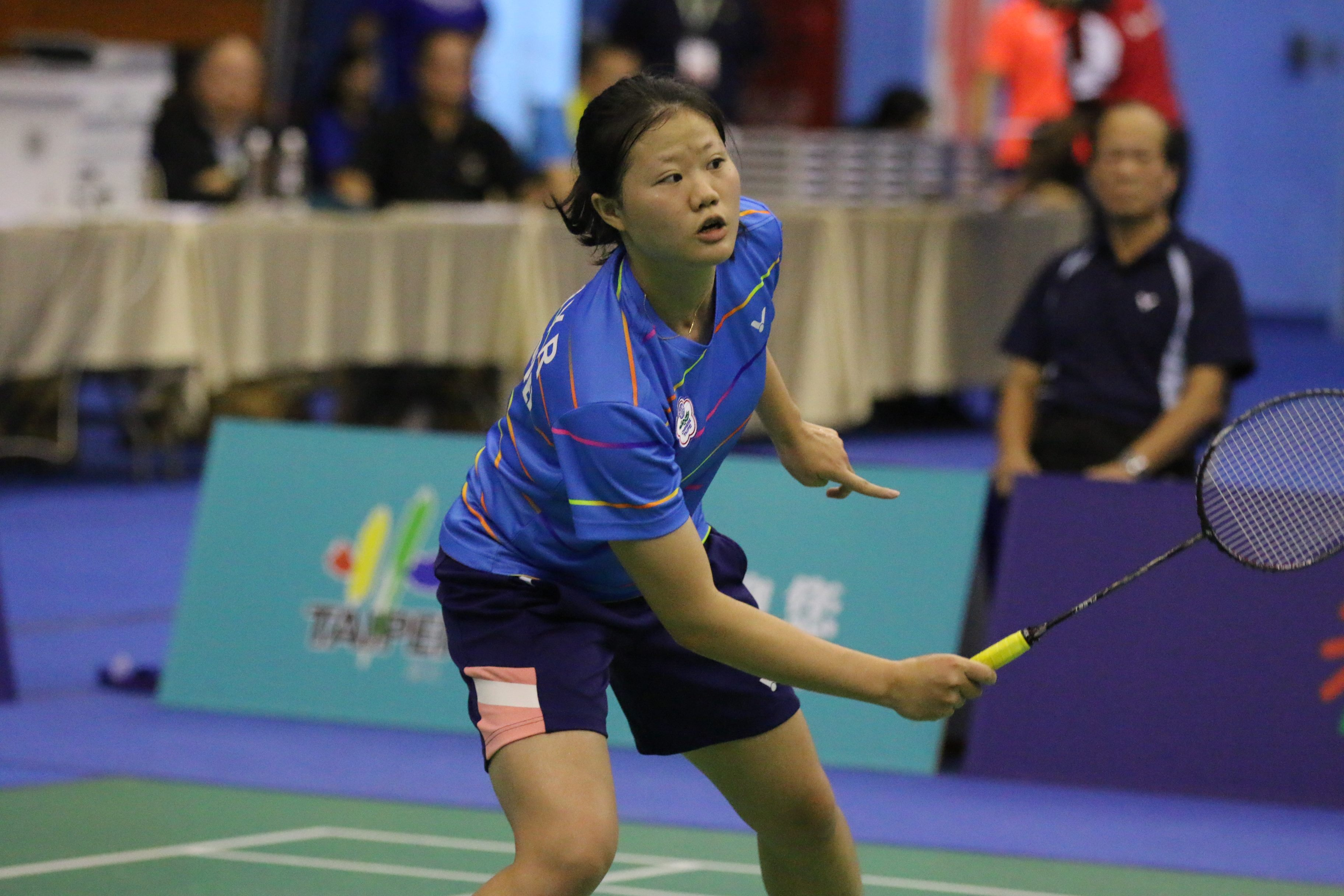
- Shen in 2019

Personal information
- Born: 24 December 1998 (age 27) Kaohsiung, Taiwan

Sport
- Country: Taiwan
- Sport: Badminton
Medal record
Women's badminton
Representing Chinese Taipei
Deaflympics
Silver medal – second place	Samsun 2017	doubles
Bronze medal – third place	Samsun 2017	mixed team
Asia Pacific Deaf Games
Bronze medal – third place	Taoyuan 2015	singles
Gold medal – first place	Taoyuan 2015	doubles
Gold medal – first place	Taoyuan 2015	mixed team

Shen Yan-ru (Chinese: 沈彥汝; pinyin: Chén Yànrǔ; born 24 December 1998) is a Taiwanese female badminton player. She competed at the 2013 Summer Deaflympics and also in the 2017 Summer Deaflympics.

Shen went onto clinch silver medal in the women's doubles at the 2017 Summer Deaflympics partnering with Jung-Yu Fan.
