= Badminton at the Deaflympics =

Badminton tournaments at the Deaflympics are organized since 1985.

== Editions ==
1. Badminton at the 1985 Summer Deaflympics (5)
2. Badminton at the 1989 Summer Deaflympics (5)
3. Badminton at the 1993 Summer Deaflympics (6)
4. Badminton at the 1997 Summer Deaflympics (6)
5. Badminton at the 2001 Summer Deaflympics (6)
6. Badminton at the 2005 Summer Deaflympics (6)
7. Badminton at the 2009 Summer Deaflympics (6)
8. Badminton at the 2013 Summer Deaflympics (5)
9. Badminton at the 2017 Summer Deaflympics (6)
10. Badminton at the 2021 Summer Deaflympics (6)
11. Badminton at the 2025 Summer Deaflympics (6)

== Medalists ==
Year	Event	1.	2.	3.
1985	Women's doubles	(New Zealand) Carolyn Hamilin (New Zealand) Janet Watt	(New Zealand) Pamela Fay Croskery (New Zealand) Penny Went	(United Kingdom) Fiona Wilson (United Kingdom) Linda Durno
1985	Women's singles	(Norway) Bente Andersen	(United Kingdom) Fiona Rosie	(United Kingdom) Fiona Wilson
1985	Men's doubles	(United Kingdom) Rodney Fletcher (United Kingdom) Martin Lawrence Bogard	(United Kingdom) Richard Boswell (United Kingdom) Alan Bridson	(Sweden) Janne Ågren (Sweden) Yngve Ingvarsson
1985	Men's singles	(United Kingdom) Rodney Fletcher	(United Kingdom) Martin Lawrence Bogard	(Denmark) Jørn Elmer
1985	Mixed doubles	(United Kingdom) Rodney Fletcher (United Kingdom) Fiona Wilson	(United Kingdom) Martin Lawrence Bogard (United Kingdom) Fiona Rosie	(United Kingdom) Richard Boswell (United Kingdom) Linda Durno
1989	Women's doubles	(United Kingdom) Andrea Mary Elizabeth Lang (United Kingdom) Fiona Wilson	(New Zealand) Pamela Fay Croskery (New Zealand) Penny Went	(New Zealand) Gillian Faye Ramsay (New Zealand) Christine J. Ryder
1989	Women's singles	(Norway) Bente Andersen	(Denmark) Karin Arboe Jensen	(United Kingdom) Andrea Mary Elizabeth Lang
1989	Men's doubles	(India) Rajeev Bagga (India) Sandeep Singh Dhillon	(United Kingdom) Nicholas Cole Warnock (United Kingdom) John Kenneth Lilley	(United Kingdom) Rodney Fletcher (United Kingdom) Martin Lawrence Bogard
1989	Men's singles	(India) Rajeev Bagga	(India) Sandeep Singh Dhillon	(Sweden) Janne Ågren
1989	Mixed doubles	(United Kingdom) Rodney Fletcher (United Kingdom) Fiona Wilson	(United Kingdom) Martin Lawrence Bogard (United Kingdom) Andrea Mary Elizabeth Lang	(United Kingdom) John Kenneth Lilley (United Kingdom) Malka Bogard
1993	Women's doubles	(Denmark) Karin Arboe Jensen (Denmark) Birgitte Worsøe Nielsen	(United Kingdom) Andrea Mary Elizabeth Hardwick (United Kingdom) Angela Nicola Sterne	(United Kingdom) Lesley Newby (United Kingdom) Fiona Wilson
1993	Women's singles	(Denmark) Karin Arboe Jensen	(Norway) Bente Andersen	(Sweden) Marie Karlsson
1993	Men's doubles	(India) Rajeev Bagga (India) Sandeep Singh Dhillon	(Netherlands) Leon Vis (Netherlands) Rudo Rijken	(United Kingdom) Martin Lawrence Bogard (United Kingdom) John Kenneth Lilley
1993	Men's singles	(India) Rajeev Bagga	(Malaysia) Teh Cheang Hock	(India) Sandeep Singh Dhillon
1993	Mixed doubles	(India) Rajeev Bagga (India) Panna M. Kapadia	(Malaysia) Teh Cheang Hock (Malaysia) Tan Seok Kean	(Sweden) Janne Ågren (Sweden) Marie Karlsson
1993	Team	India (Rajeev Bagga, Sandeep Singh Dhillon, Samir Kesarinath Chogle, Dynanda Gajanan Date, Panna M. Kapadia, Girish Pai, Rajinishree Prem Thota)	Netherlands (Hans Bakker, Elles Michels, Rudo Rijken, Casparina van Beek, Nancy van Beek, Leon Vis)	Denmark (Karin Arboe Jensen, Birgitte Worsøe Nielsen, Micheal Borup Jensen, Jannich Tanghus Andersen, Jens Bertelsen, Henrik Roar Hansen)
1997	Women's doubles	(United Kingdom) Susanah Storey (United Kingdom) Lesley Newby	(Germany) Saskia Wummelsdorf (Germany) Elke Gerstner	(Switzerland) Ursula Brunner (Switzerland) Silvia Weibel
1997	Women's singles	(Germany) Saskia Wummelsdorf	(India) Ranjini Ramanujam	(South Korea) Park Hae-Yeon
1997	Men's doubles	(India) Rajeev Bagga (India) Sandeep Singh Dhillon	(Denmark) Jannich Tanghus Andersen (Denmark) Jesper Vingum Jensen	(Japan) Tomofumi Kobori (Japan) Takaaki Miyatake
1997	Men's singles	(India) Rajeev Bagga	(Denmark) Jannich Tanghus Andersen	(India) Sandeep Singh Dhillon
1997	Mixed doubles	(Denmark) Jannich Tanghus Andersen (Denmark) Birgitte Worsøe Nielsen	(Netherlands) Leon Vis (Netherlands) Elles Michels	(United Kingdom) Martin Lawrence Bogard (United Kingdom) Lesley Newby
1997	Team	India (Rajeev Bagga, Sandeep Singh Dhillon, Ranjini Ramanujam, Sonu Anand Sharma, Rohit Bhaker, Gaurav Muchhal)	United Kingdom (Martin Lawrence Bogard, Christopher Sacre, Carl Sadler, Janet Margaret Thomson, Lesley Newby, Susanah Storey, David Ingham, Rita Murdock)	Denmark (Connie Apitzsch, Birgitte Worsøe Nielsen, Charlotte Bjerg Jensen, Jannich Tanghus Andersen, Jesper Vingum Jensen, Søren Glad Jørgensen, Henrik Roar Hansen)
2001	Women's doubles	(South Korea) Jeong Seon-hwa (South Korea) Park Hae-yeon	(Japan) Teruyo Haga (Japan) Mari Ishii	(United Kingdom) Andrea Mary Elizabeth Hardwick (United Kingdom) Lesley Holdsworth
2001	Women's singles	(Japan) Mari Ishii	(South Korea) Jeong Seon-hwa	(Lithuania) Kristina Dovydaityte
2001	Men's doubles	(India) Rajeev Bagga (India) Sandeep Singh Dhillon	(Malaysia) Teh Cheang Hock (Malaysia) Mar Meng Wan	(South Korea) Lee Jong-bong (South Korea) Sin Hyun-woo
2001	Men's singles	(India) Rajeev Bagga	(Malaysia) Teh Cheang Hock	(South Korea) Lee Jong-bong
2001	Mixed doubles	(India) Rajeev Bagga (India) Kashmira Joglekar	(South Korea) Sin Hyun-woo (South Korea) Jeong Seon-hwa	(Japan) Tomofumi Kobori (Japan) Mari Ishii
2001	Team	South Korea (Lee Sang-In, Yoo Young-Jin, Yu Eun Kyung, Lee Jong-bong, Sin Hyun-woo, Jeong Seon-hwa, Park Hae-yeon)	Malaysia (Teh Cheang Hock, Mar Meng Wan, Wu Wai Loon, Yeo Kok Fang, Artika Suraya Ayub, Foo Chiew Phing)	Japan (Teruyo Haga, Mari Ishii, Takaaki Miyatake, Tomofumi Kobori)
2005	Women's doubles	(Japan) Mari Ishii (Japan) Mika Hiwatari	(South Korea) Jeong Seon-hwa (South Korea) Park Hae-yeon	(Lithuania) Jevgenija Novik (Lithuania) Kristina Dovydaityte
2005	Women's singles	(Lithuania) Kristina Dovydaityte	(South Korea) Jeong Seon-hwa	(South Korea) Park Hae-yeon
2005	Men's doubles	(India) Rajeev Bagga (India) Sandeep Singh Dhillon	(South Korea) Lee Jong-bong (South Korea) Sin Hyun-woo	(Russia) Artemy Mikhailovich Karpov (Russia) Mikhail Alexandrovich Efremov
2005	Men's singles	(India) Rajeev Bagga	(Thailand) Nattachai Unsomsri	(India) Rohit Bhaker
2005	Mixed doubles	(South Korea) Sin Hyun-woo (South Korea) Jeong Seon-hwa	(Lithuania) Tomas Dovidaityte (Lithuania) Kristina Dovydaityte	(Russia) Artemy Mikhailovich Karpov (Russia) Alena Igorevna Pavlova
2005	Team	South Korea (Bak Eun-Jeong, Lee Jong-bong, Sin Hyun-woo, Jeong Seon-hwa, Park Hae-yeon, Woo Ji-soo)	Germany (Helga Diesslin, Saskia Fischer, Rainer Martin Gebauer, Elke Gerstner, Svenja Klopp, Michael Thomas, Oliver Witte)	India (Rajeev Bagga, Sandeep Singh Dhillon, Payel Ghosh, Rajinishree Prem Thota, Ranjini Ramanujam, Rohit Bhaker, Gaurav Muchhal, Joyashree Sarkar)
2009	Women's doubles	(South Korea) Yu Eun-kyung (South Korea) Jeong Seon-hwa	(Russia) Olga Andreevna Shtayger (Russia) Alena Igorevna Soboleva	(China) Wang Meng (China) Zhang Yi
2009	Women's singles	(Bulgaria) Gergana Baramova	(China) Wang Meng	(Lithuania) Kristina Dovydaityte
2009	Men's doubles	(Russia) Artemy Mikhailovich Karpov (Russia) Mikhail Alexandrovich Efremov	(Malaysia) Yeo Kok Fang (Malaysia) Teh Cheang Hock	(South Korea) Lee Jong-bong (South Korea) Sin Hyun-woo
2009	Men's singles	(Russia) Artemy Mikhailovich Karpov	(United Kingdom) Rajeev Bagga	(China) Lu Guangyao
2009	Mixed doubles	(South Korea) Sin Hyun-woo (South Korea) Jeong Seon-hwa	(Russia) Artemy Mikhailovich Karpov (Russia) Alena Igorevna Soboleva	(Japan) Tomofumi Kobori (Japan) Mari Ishii
2009	Team	South Korea (Arum Joung, Choi Jin-woo, Yu Eun-kyung, Lee Jong-bong, Jung Sun-ho, Sin Hyun-woo, Jeong Seon-hwa, Kim Sung-hee)	Russia (Valery Valeryevich Antonov, Mikhail Alexandrovich Efremov, Artemy Mikhailovich Karpov, Olga Andreevna Shtayger, Alena Igorevna Soboleva)	Lithuania (Tomas Dovidaityte, Ignas Reznikas, Kristina Dovydaityte, Kazimieras Dauskurtas, Emilija Mateikaite, Viktorija Novik)
2013	Women's doubles	(China) Jang Jialei (China) Wang Meng	(China) Wang Meng Xing (China) Zhang Heng	(Russia) Alena Soboleva (Russia) Olga Shtayger
2013	Women's singles	Jung-Yu Fan	(Bulgaria) Gergana Baramova	(South Korea) Jeong Seonhwa
2013	Men's doubles	(Russia) Artemy Mikhailovich Karpov (Russia) Mikhail Alexandrovich Efremov	(South Korea) Shin Hyunwoo (South Korea) Shin Kyungduk	(Indonesia) Edi Susanto (Indonesia) Aditya Hermawan
2013	Men's singles	(Russia) Shokhzod Khudodagi Gulomzoda	(South Korea) Shin Hyunwoo	(South Korea) Seo Myeongsoo
2013	Mixed doubles	(Russia) Artemy Mikhailovich Karpov (Russia) Alena Igorevna Soboleva	(Russia) Shokhzod Khudodagi Gulomzoda (Russia) Olga Shtayger	(Russia) Mikhail Alexandrovich Efremov (Russia) Anastasia Yuryevna Sedova
2017	Women's doubles	(China) Zhang Heng Yan (China) Wang Meng	Jung-Yu Fan; Yan-Ru Shen	(South Korea) Jeong Seonhwa (South Korea) Lee Soyeong
2017	Women's singles	(China) Wang Meng	(South Korea) Jeong Seonhwa	(Japan) Manami Nagahara
2017	Men's doubles	(Thailand) Siriwat Mattayanumat (Thailand) Ittikorn Punyangam	(South Korea) Shin Hyunwoo (South Korea) Soo Myeongsoo	(Russia) Valery Valeryevich Antonov (Russia) Mikhail Yefremov
2017	Men's singles	(China) Kaifeng Tang	(Russia) Artemy Mikhailovich Karpov	(Russia) Shokhzod Khudodagi Gulomzoda
2017	Mixed doubles	(Russia) Artemy Mikhailovich Karpov (Russia) Alena Igorevna Soboleva	(Malaysia) Boon Wei Ying (Malaysia) Heng Bock Francis Tan	(China) Ding Yibo (China) Zhang Heng Yan
2017	Team	China (Ding Yibo, Lu Guangyao, Tang Kaifeng, Wang Meng, Wang Meng Xing, Zhang Heng Yan)	Russia (Valery Valeryevich Antonov, Olga Dormidontova, Mikhail Efremov, Shokhzod Khudodagi Gulomzoda, Artemy Mikhailovich Karpov, Karina Khakimova, Olga Andreevna Shtayger, Alena Igorevna Soboleva)	Chinese Taipei (Chen Chung-I, Fan Jung-Yu, Hsieh Li-Chi, Huang Chen-Che, Huang Cheng-I, Shen Yan-Ru, Tu Wen-Hsuan, Yin Shih-Rong)

== Medal table ==
Rank	Nation	Gold	Silver	Bronze	Total
1	India	14	2	4	20
2	South Korea	8	10	9	27
3	Great Britain	6	9	10	25
4	Russia	6	6	4	16
5	China	5	4	3	12
6	Japan	4	3	5	12
7	Denmark	3	3	3	9
8	Individual Neutral Athletes	3	1	0	4
9	Norway	2	1	0	3
10	Chinese Taipei	1	2	3	6
11	New Zealand	1	2	1	4
12	Germany	1	2	0	3
13	Thailand	1	1	1	3
14	Bulgaria	1	1	0	2
15	Lithuania	1	0	4	5
16	Malaysia	0	7	1	8
17	Netherlands	0	3	0	3
18	Sweden	0	0	4	4
19	Austria	0	0	1	1
19	Hong Kong	0	0	1	1
19	Indonesia	0	0	1	1
19	Poland	0	0	1	1
19	Switzerland	0	0	1	1
Totals (23 entries)		57	57	57	171
