= Saskia Wummelsdorf =

Personal information
- Full name: Saskia Wummelsdorf Fischer
- Born: 2 May 1980 (age 46)

Sport
- Country: Germany
- Sport: Badminton
Medal record
Women's badminton
Representing Germany
Deaflympics
Gold medal – first place	Copenhagen 1997	singles
Silver medal – second place	Copenhagen 1997	doubles
Silver medal – second place	Melbourne 2005	team

Saskia Wummelsdorf Fischer (born 2 May 1980) is a German badminton player. She has competed in the 1997, 2005, 2009 and 2013 Summer Deaflympics.

Wummelsdorf has won three medals in her Deaflympic career, including a gold medal.

== See also ==
Badminton at the Deaflympics
