= Kashmira Joglekar =

Indian badminton player

Kashmira Ram Joglekar (born 16 November 1985) is an Indian badminton player from Pune. She is profoundly deaf.

== Career ==
She was Indian national team player for deaf in 2000 and 2001. She clinched a gold medal in mixed double championship with Rajeev Bagga at the Deaflympics in 2001.

She has also snatched bronze in singles and a silver in doubles at the 2000 Asian games for Deaf which was held in Taiwan.
Kashmira played for local teams of Hyderabad, Andhra Pradesh State, Maharashtra State during her professional career of badminton. In Hyderabad, she was trained under Mr.S M Arif. In 1998, she moved to Pune and started training under Mr. Devdhar. She left professional badminton after ankle injury in 2001.
Kashmira studied in Renuka Swaroop High school in Pune. She was awarded Alexander Graham Bell Scholarship for studious deaf student for 6 years during her primary and secondary education. She secured 1st Rank among handicapped category throughout Maharashtra in SSC examination in 2001. She also secured 1st place in whole Maharashtra State during HSC examination in 2003. Kashmira got admission for Computer Engineering in Government College of Engineering Pune (COEP). She worked in HP for 3 years and in Kale Consultancy for around a year before moving to Norway.

== See also ==
- India at the Deaflympics
