= World Deaf Badminton Championships =

International badminton competition for deaf people

The World Deaf Badminton Championships are organized by Comité International des Sports des Sourds since 2003. They are held every four years.

== Championships ==
Year	Edition	Host city	NOC
2003	1	Sofia	Bulgaria
2007	2	Mülheim	Germany
2011	3	Bucheon	South Korea
2015	4	Sofia	Bulgaria
2019	5	Taipei	Taiwan

World Youth Deaf Badminton Championships

Year	Edition	Host city	NOC
2015	1	Sofia	Bulgaria
2019	2	Taipei	Taiwan

== Medalists ==
Year	Event	1.	2.	3.
2003	Women's doubles	(South Korea) Jeong Seon-hwa (South Korea) Bak Eun-jeong	(Lithuania) Kristina Dovydaityte (Lithuania) Jevgenija Novik	(Switzerland) Isabelle Cicala (Switzerland) Sophie Bula
2003	Women's singles	(South Korea) Jeong Seon-hwa	(Lithuania) Kristina Dovydaityte	(Russia) Olga Andreevna Gurina
2003	Men's doubles	(South Korea) Sin Hyun-woo (South Korea) Woo Ji-soo	(Russia) Artemy Mikhailovich Karpov (Russia) Anton Vladimirovich Kulakov	(Denmark) Jannich Tanghus Andersen (Denmark) Jesper Söndergaard
2003	Men's singles	(India) Rajeev Bagga	(Denmark) Jannich Tanghus Andersen	(South Korea) Woo Ji-soo
2003	Mixed doubles	(Lithuania) Tomas Dovydaityte (Lithuania) Kristina Dovydaityte	(Russia) Artemy Mikhailovich Karpov (Russia) Galina Vasilieva	(South Korea) Sin Hyun-woo (South Korea) Jeong Seon-hwa
2007	Women's doubles	(Japan) Mika Hiwatari (Japan) Mio Inoue	(Bulgaria) Gergana Stoyanova Baramova (Bulgaria) Silviya Arsova Chapkanova	(South Korea) Yu Eun-kyung (South Korea) Jeong Seon-hwa
2007	Women's singles	(Lithuania) Kristina Dovydaityte	(Russia) Olga Andreevna Gurina	(South Korea) Jeong Seon-hwa
2007	Men's doubles	(Malaysia) Teh Cheang Hock (Malaysia) Yeo Kok Fang	(England) Rajeev Bagga (England) Carl Sadler	(Chinese Taipei) Huang Chung-Han (Chinese Taipei) Lin Chien-Chen
2007	Men's singles	(England) Rajeev Bagga	(Denmark) Jannich Tanghus Andersen	(India) Rohit Bhaker
2007	Mixed doubles	(Russia) Artemy Mikhailovich Karpov (Russia) Alena Igorevna Pavlova	(Lithuania) Tomas Dovydaityte (Lithuania) Kristina Dovydaityte	(Germany) Oliver Witte (Germany) Saskia Fischer
2007	Team	Russia (Mikhail Alexandrovich Efremov, Feliks Galkin, Olga Andreevna Gurina, Artemy Mikhailovich Karpov, Alena Igorevna Pavlova, Alexander Sergeevich Vasiliev)	Japan (Mari Ishii, Takeshi Katsuta, Daisuke Miyazaki, Mika Hiwatari, Mio Inoue, Jun Nakanishi, Aiko Nozu)	Lithuania (Tomas Dovydaityte, Kristina Dovydaityte, Emilija Mateikaite, Viktorija Novik, Kazimieras Dauskurtas)
