= Rohit Bhaker =

Indian badminton player (born 1984)

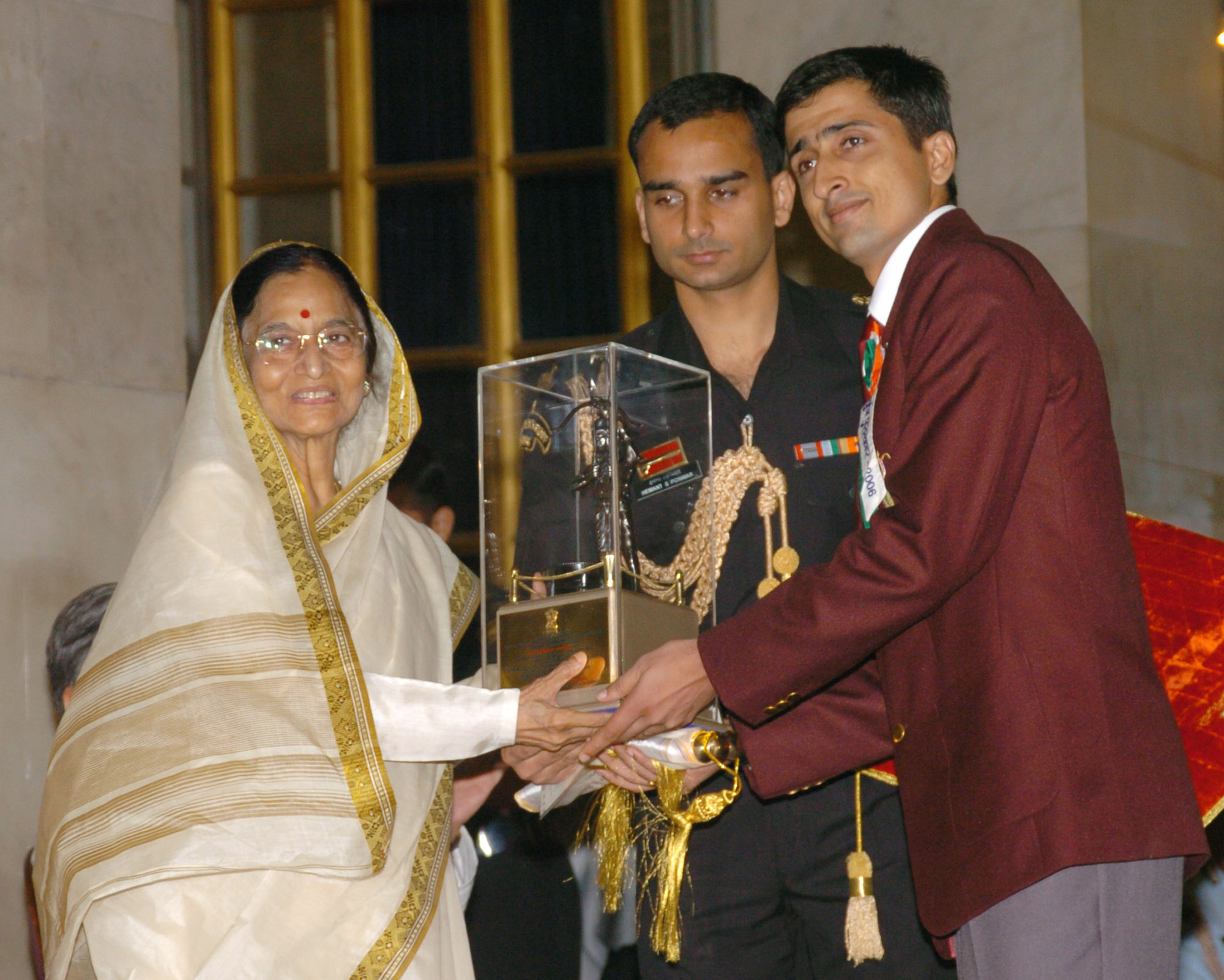
- Bhaker in 2007

Personal information
- Born: 26 October 1984 (age 41)

Sport
- Country: India
- Sport: Badminton
Medal record
Representing India
Men's badminton
Deaflympics
Gold medal – first place	Caxias do Sul 2022	team
Gold medal – first place	Copenhagen 1997	team
Bronze medal – third place	Melbourne 2005	singles
Bronze medal – third place	Melbourne 2005	team
World Deaf Badminton Championships
Bronze medal – third place	2007	singles
6th Asia Pacific games Deaf Taipel
Silver medal – second place	2000	Doubles

Rohit Bhaker (born 26 October 1984) is an Indian deaf badminton player.

== Biography ==
Rohit Bhaker was born profoundly deaf and he has the inability to speak. He is from Bhiwani and is currently residing in Bhiwani for badminton practices and works in HVPNL. In 1997 for his achievement in his debut Deaflympic event (1997), he was awarded the National Child Award for Exceptional Achievement, an Indian national award to child artists who perform exception achievements in any field. He also received Arjuna Award for his efforts in the sport of badminton.

== Career ==
Rohit made his Deaflympic debut in the 1997 Summer Deaflympics at the age of just twelve and was a member of the Indian badminton team which won the gold medal in the mixed team event, which also featured Rajeev Bagga. This achievement made him the youngest male medalist at the Deaflympic history (12 years, 8 months and 17 days) and also became the youngest gold medalist in the history of Deaflympics.

Rohit Bhaker too claimed bronze medals in the men's singles and mixed team events as a part of the 2005 Summer Deaflympics.

He is often compared to Rajeev Bagga, a fellow Indian deaf badminton player who has clinched 12 gold medals at the Deaflympics.

== See also ==
- India at the Deaflympics
