= Gergana Baramova =

Bulgarian badminton player (born 1989)

Personal information
- Born: Гергана Баръмова; December 9, 1989 (age 36)

Sport
- Country: Bulgaria
- Sport: Badminton
Medal record
Women's badminton
Representing Bulgaria
Deaflympics
Gold medal – first place	Taipei 2009	singles
Silver medal – second place	Sofia 2013	singles
World Deaf Badminton Championships
Silver medal – second place	2007	doubles
Bronze medal – third place	2011	singles

Gergana Stoyanova Baramova (Bulgarian: Гергана Стоянова Баръмова) (born 9 December 1989, Veliko Tarnovo) is a Bulgarian female badminton player. She is profoundly deaf and has mainly competed at the Deaflympics and World Deaf Badminton Championships.

Gergana made her Deaflympic debut at the 2005 Summer Deaflympics which was held in Melbourne. She then went onto compete at the 2009 Summer Deaflympics and clinched gold medal in the women's singles event. In the 2013 Summer Deaflympics, which was her last Deaflympic appearance claimed silver medal in the women's singles event after becoming runners-up to Jung-Yu Fan.

Gergana Baramova also claimed silver medal in the women's doubles at the 2007 World Deaf Badminton Championships and also secured a bronze medal in the women's singles as a part of the 2011 World Deaf Badminton Championships.
