= 2019 BWF World Senior Championships – 50+ =

Tournament details
- Dates: 4 August 2019 – 11 August 2019
- Edition: 9
- Level: International
- Competitors: 239 from 36 nations
- Venue: Spodek
- Location: Katowice, Poland

Champions
- Men's singles: (Chinese Taipei) Wu Chang-jun
- Women's singles: (England) Caroline Hale
- Men's doubles: (Thailand) Wattana Ampunsuwan (Thailand) Narong Vanichitsarakul
- Women's doubles: (Japan) Kumiko Kushiyama (Japan) Ritsuko Sato
- Mixed doubles: (England) Rajeev Bagga (England) Elizabeth Austin

These are the results of 2019 BWF World Senior Championships' 50+ events.

== Men's singles ==
=== Seeds ===
1. (Chinese Taipei) Wu Chang-jun (gold medalist)
2. (Thailand) Karoon Kasayapanan (third round)
3. (Thailand) Narong Vanichitsarakul (quarterfinals)
4. (Sweden) Joakim Nordgren (bronze medalist)
5. (Denmark) Kent Wæde Hansen (withdrew)
6. (Sweden) Magnus Gustafsson (fourth round)
7. (Denmark) Jean Chistensen (third round)
8. (Germany) Ronald Glaschke (fourth round)
9. (Switzerland) Hubert Mueller (fourth round)
10. (Sri Lanka) Nihal Amarasena (second round)
11. (Republic of Ireland) Mark Peard (third round)
12. (Finland) Juan Rafols (third round)
13. (India) Rajeev Sharma (quarterfinals)
14. (Poland) Jacek Hankiewicz (silver medalist)
15. (Germany) Sven Landwehr (second round)
16. (Finland) Jukka Antila (third round)

=== Finals ===
Quarterfinals
1	(Chinese Taipei) Wu Chang-jun	21	21
(Finland) Tarmo Martikainen	10	9
3	(Thailand) Narong Vanichitsarakul	22	21	13
(India) B. V. S. K. Lingeswara Rao	24	14	21
13	(India) Rajeev Sharma	18	16
4	(Sweden) Joakim Nordgren	21	21
14	(Poland) Jacek Hankiewicz	21	21
(Sweden) Stefan Grahn	16	7

Semifinals
1	(Chinese Taipei) Wu Chang-jun	21	21
(India) B. V. S. K. Lingeswara Rao	8	11
4	(Sweden) Joakim Nordgren	21	16	13
14	(Poland) Jacek Hankiewicz	15	21	21

Final
1	(Chinese Taipei) Wu Chang-jun	21	21
14	(Poland) Jacek Hankiewicz	16	14

=== Top half ===
==== Section 1 ====
First round

Second round
1	(Chinese Taipei) Wu C-j	21	21
(Estonia) M Tammik	7	7
(Croatia) S Saban	12	21	21
(Spain) J C Padilla	21	13	15
9	(Switzerland) H Mueller	21	21
(Czech Republic) P Komarovský	6	6
(France) J C Lempereur	21	21
(Sri Lanka) A Jayantha	19	15

Third round
1	(Chinese Taipei) Wu C-j	21	21
(Croatia) S Saban	6	7
9	(Switzerland) H Mueller	23	21
(France) J C Lempereur	21	17

Fourth Round
1	(Chinese Taipei) Wu C-j	21	21
9	(Switzerland) H Mueller	5	16

==== Section 2 ====
First round
(United Arab Emirates) P Ponnengattil	15	18
(Sweden) P J Baeza	21	21

Second round
7	(Denmark) J Chistensen	21	21
(England) P Owens	8	7
(Poland) R Bieganowski	8	17
(India) A Gangani	21	21
15	(Germany) S Landwehr	19	15
(Finland) T Martikainen	21	21
(Slovakia) F Šaroch	7	10
(Sweden) P J Baeza	21	21

Third round
7	(Denmark) J Chistensen	13	18
(India) A Gangani	21	21
(Finland) T Martikainen	21	21
(Sweden) P J Baeza	13	13

Fourth Round
(India) A Gangani	19	7
(Finland) T Martikainen	21	21

==== Section 3 ====
First round

Second round
3	(Thailand) N Vanichitsarakul	21	21
(Czech Republic) J Konupka	8	12
(Denmark) C Fischer	21	12	24
(Poland) R Bogdański	18	21	22
10	(Sri Lanka) N Amarasena	21	16
(Germany) S Schrader	23	21
(Belgium) E J. Timmerman	21	21
(Austria) N Genin	7	13

Third round
3	(Thailand) N Vanichitsarakul	21	21
(Denmark) C Fischer	6	11
(Germany) S Schrader	21	10	21
(Belgium) E J. Timmerman	11	21	13

Fourth Round
3	(Thailand) N Vanichitsarakul	21	21
(Germany) S Schrader	13	16

==== Section 4 ====
First round
(Norway) P Bhart	9	6
(India) B. V. S. K. Lingeswara Rao	21	21

Second round
6	(Sweden) M Gustafsson	21	21
(Lithuania) E Cizinauskas	7	4
(England) T Shearman	12	6
(Ukraine) O Tsyhankov	21	21
12	(Finland) J Rafols	21	21
(France) F Arsène	18	16
(Slovakia) P Scholtz	9	6
(India) B. V. S. K. Lingeswara Rao	21	21

Third round
6	(Sweden) M Gustafsson	21	19	21
(Ukraine) O Tsyhankov	15	21	14
12	(Finland) J Rafols	10	19
(India) B. V. S. K. Lingeswara Rao	21	21

Fourth Round
6	(Sweden) M Gustafsson	12	16
(India) B. V. S. K. Lingeswara Rao	21	21

=== Bottom half ===
==== Section 5 ====
First round
(Germany) M Brameyer	15	21	21
(Slovakia) I Novak	21	9	13

Second round
(Germany) M Brameyer	21	21
(Estonia) E Veede	19	8
(Switzerland) B Büsser	8	14
13	(India) R Sharma	21	21
(Sri Lanka) A Dodampe Gamage	16	20
(France) F Jooris	21	22
(Belgium) W Huijs	15	18
SUB	(Denmark) H Lykke	21	21

Third round
(Germany) M Brameyer	15	16
13	(India) R Sharma	21	21
(France) F Jooris	10	7
SUB	(Denmark) H Lykke	21	21

Fourth Round
13	(India) R Sharma	16	21	21
SUB	(Denmark) H Lykke	21	13	12

==== Section 6 ====
First round

Second round
(Thailand) P Seatang	21	21
(United Arab Emirates) R Sunil	16	11
(Latvia) E Kupfers	8	15
16	(Finland) J Antila	21	21
(Portugal) L Nesbitt	21	21
(England) K George	11	18
(Poland) W Romańczuk	4	13
4	(Sweden) J Nordgren	21	21

Third round
(Thailand) P Seatang	21	14	21
16	(Finland) J Antila	17	21	19
(Portugal) L Nesbitt	12	10
4	(Sweden) J Nordgren	21	21

Fourth Round
(Thailand) P Seatang	9	4
4	(Sweden) J Nordgren	21	21

==== Section 7 ====
First round
(England) I Richardson	15	16
(Denmark) E Pedersen	21	21

Second round
(Denmark) E Pedersen	21	12	21
(Switzerland) D Cattin	10	21	19
(Czech Republic) P Halsch	14	14
14	(Poland) J Hankiewicz	21	21
(Finland) P Salhoja	21	19	18
(Austria) E Tomes	18	21	21
(Norway) A Skavhaug	7	14
8	(Germany) R Glaschke	21	21

Third round
(Denmark) E Pedersen	4	11
14	(Poland) J Hankiewicz	21	21
(Austria) E Tomes	8	9
8	(Germany) R Glaschke	21	21

Fourth Round
14	(Poland) J Hankiewicz	21	21
8	(Germany) R Glaschke	9	8

==== Section 8 ====
First round

Second round
(India) J Dewangan	21	21
(France) F Pichard	15	8
(Russia) E Lentochink	8	5
11	(Republic of Ireland) M Peard	21	21
(Sweden) S Grahn	21	21
(Sri Lanka) L Homer	13	14
(United Arab Emirates) N S Ul Mulk
2	(Thailand) K Kasayapanan	w	/	o

Third round
(India) J Dewangan	21	7	21
11	(Republic of Ireland) M Peard	17	21	16
(Sweden) S Grahn	21	21
2	(Thailand) K Kasayapanan	9	18

Fourth Round
(India) J Dewangan	18	16
(Sweden) S Grahn	21	21

== Women's singles ==
=== Seeds ===
1. (Germany) Tanja Eberl (bronze medalist)
2. (Poland) Dorota Grzejdak (bronze medalist)
3. (England) Caroline Hale (gold medalist)
4. (England) Betty Blair (quarterfinals)
5. (India) Poonam Tatwawadi (quarterfinals)
6. (Norway) Berit Thyness (quarterfinals)
7. (Scotland) Aileen Travers (quarterfinals)
8. (Switzerland) Bettina Villars (second round)

=== Finals ===
Semifinals
1	(Germany) Tanja Eberl	19	14
3	(England) Caroline Hale	21	21
(Japan) Kumiko Kushiyama	21	21
2	(Poland) Dorota Grzejdak	17	18

Final
3	(England) Caroline Hale	21	21
(Japan) Kumiko Kushiyama	19	18

=== Top half ===
==== Section 1 ====
First round
(Poland) A Brojek	19	21	23
(Slovakia) E Scholtzová	21	13	21
(India) S Sawant	21	20	16
(Sweden) L Nilsson	15	22	21

Second round
1	(Germany) T Eberl	21	21
(England) O Bryant	9	6
(France) P Valdenaire	21	21
(Poland) A Brojek	11	11
6	(Norway) B Thyness	21	21
(Finland) T Luola	3	11
(Belgium) M Loos	14	17
(Sweden) L Nilsson	21	21

Third round
1	(Germany) T Eberl	21	21
(France) P Valdenaire	11	9
6	(Norway) B Thyness	21	21
(Sweden) L Nilsson	8	17

Quarterfinals
1	(Germany) T Eberl	21	21
6	(Norway) B Thyness	18	13

==== Section 2 ====
First round
(Finland) P Petäys	21	21
(Poland) M Kabarowska	17	8
(Germany) K Tröger	16	22	21
(France) E Heuberger	21	20	8

Second round
3	(England) C Hale	21	21
(Slovakia) A Eliášková	7	6
(Sweden) A-M Wellendorph	20	21	17
(Finland) P Petäys	22	17	21
7	(Scotland) A Travers	21	21
(Switzerland) R Syed	8	11
(India) J S Thathapanda	10	11
(Germany) K Tröger	21	21

Third round
3	(England) C Hale	21	21
(Finland) P Petäys	2	2
7	(Scotland) A Travers	21	17	21
(Germany) K Tröger	14	21	9

Quarterfinals
3	(England) C Hale	14	21	21
7	(Scotland) A Travers	21	12	16

=== Bottom half ===
==== Section 3 ====
First round
(Poland) B Szczecina	6	13
(Sweden) T Karlsson	21	21
(Norway) G Fiskergaard	8	7
(Japan) K Kushiyama	21	21
(Germany) A Stock	21	21
(Spain) E Barbera	16	11

Second round
(Sweden) T Karlsson	21	21
(India) H Baghe	10	7
(Japan) K Kushiyama	21	21
8	(Switzerland) B Villars	9	18
(Germany) A Stock	21	21
(Greece) G Vernardo	5	8
(France) L Renon	13	9
4	(England) B Blair	21	21

Third round
(Sweden) T Karlsson	11	17
(Japan) K Kushiyama	21	21
(Germany) A Stock	16	13
4	(England) B Blair	21	21

Quarterfinals
(Japan) K Kushiyama	21	21
4	(England) B Blair	17	14

==== Section 4 ====
First round
(Sweden) D Levin	17	12
(United Arab Emirates) V P Manghnani	21	21
(England) D Miller	14	17
(France) A Lluch	21	21

Second round
(United Arab Emirates) V P Manghnani	21	21
(Slovakia) E Kuttnerová	15	16
(Belgium) H Rovers	15	16
5	(India) P Tatwawadi	21	21
(France) A Lluch	16	17
(Germany) H Stock	21	21
(Finland) S Roivainen	8	15
2	(Poland) D Grzejdak	21	21

Third round
(United Arab Emirates) V P Manghnani	14	17
5	(India) P Tatwawadi	21	21
(Germany) H Stock	13	8
2	(Poland) D Grzejdak	21	21

Quarterfinals
5	(India) P Tatwawadi	10	9
2	(Poland) D Grzejdak	21	21

== Men's doubles ==
=== Seeds ===
1. (Indonesia) Bobby Ertanto / (Malaysia) Ting Wei Ping (second round)
2. (Republic of Ireland) Graham Henderson / Mark Topping (second round)
3. (England) Jon Austin / Rajeev Bagga (quarterfinals)
4. (Denmark) Jean Chistensen / Henrik Lykke (bronze medalists)
5. (Sweden) Magnus Nytell / Erik Söderberg (second round)
6. (Thailand) Wattana Ampunsuwan / Narong Vanichitsarakul (gold medalists)
7. (Sweden) Milan Duvsund / Joakim Nordgren (quarterfinals)
8. (India) Venkataraju Akula / B. V. S. K. Lingeswara Rao (quarterfinals)

=== Finals ===
Semifinals
(Poland) Jerzy Dołhan (Poland) Jacek Hankiewicz	12	21	17
(Denmark) Peter Busch-Jensen (Denmark) Bo Sorensen	21	17	21
4	(Denmark) Jean Chistensen (Denmark) Henrik Lykke	10	11
6	(Thailand) Wattana Ampunsuwan (Thailand) Narong Vanichitsarakul	21	21

Final
(Denmark) Peter Busch-Jensen (Denmark) Bo Sorensen	19	14
6	(Thailand) Wattana Ampunsuwan (Thailand) Narong Vanichitsarakul	21	21

=== Top half ===
==== Section 1 ====
First round
(Germany) R Glaschke (Germany) F Schröder	21	18
(Poland) J Dołhan (Poland) J Hankiewicz	23	21
(France) D Dahlen (France) F Pichard	9	13
(Switzerland) H Mueller (Netherlands) M Van Daal	21	21
(Sweden) P J Baeza (Sweden) S Grahn	21	21
(Latvia) M Avotiņŝ (Latvia) E Kupfers	7	8
(Denmark) C Fischer (Denmark) J F Jensen	14	21	18
(Spain) B Galmés (Spain) M Á Polo	21	15	21
(Finland) M Emran (Finland) J Jalkanen	21	16	15
(England) P Owens (England) G Pearse	19	21	21

Second round
1	(Indonesia) B Ertanto (Malaysia) Ting W P	18	21	14
(Poland) J Dołhan (Poland) J Hankiewicz	21	17	21
(Sri Lanka) A Dodampe Gamage (Sri Lanka) A Jayantha
(Switzerland) H Mueller (Netherlands) M Van Daal	w	/	o
8	(India) V Akula (India) B. V. S. K. Lingeswara Rao	21	19	22
(Sweden) P J Baeza (Sweden) S Grahn	13	21	20
(Spain) B Galmés (Spain) M Á Polo	14	21	21
(England) P Owens (England) G Pearse	21	9	13

Third round
(Poland) J Dołhan (Poland) J Hankiewicz	w	/	o
(Switzerland) H Mueller (Netherlands) M Van Daal
8	(India) V Akula (India) B. V. S. K. Lingeswara Rao	21	18	21
(Spain) B Galmés (Spain) M Á Polo	13	21	16

Quarterfinals
(Poland) J Dołhan (Poland) J Hankiewicz	21	21
8	(India) V Akula (India) B. V. S. K. Lingeswara Rao	18	16

==== Section 2 ====
First round
(France) F Arsène (France) P Talbert	21	21
(Lithuania) A Morkūnas (Lithuania) L Vaškevičius	15	17
(Poland) J Murach (Poland) W Romańczuk	17	12
(Estonia) M Tammik (Estonia) E Veede	21	21
(South Korea) Hong S-g (South Korea) Park C-h	8	6
(India) V S M Akula (India) M K Rao	21	21
(Denmark) P Busch-Jensen (Denmark) B Sorensen	21	21
(Austria) N Genin (United Arab Emirates) N S Ul Mulk	7	5
(Chinese Taipei) Hsiao P-r (Chinese Taipei) Su J-l	21	21
(Finland) J Miininen (Finland) J Mikkonen	11	9
(Bahrain) H A M Alabbasi (Bahrain) P N Ommer	14	18
(Germany) S Schrader (Germany) H Wippich	21	21

Second round
3	(England) J Austin (England) R Bagga	21	21
(France) F Arsène (France) P Talbert	12	15
(Estonia) M Tammik (Estonia) E Veede	21	18	19
(India) V S M Akula (India) M K Rao	18	21	21
5	(Sweden) M Nytell (Sweden) E Söderberg	21	21	16
(Denmark) P Busch-Jensen (Denmark) B Sorensen	23	19	21
(Chinese Taipei) Hsiao P-r (Chinese Taipei) Su J-l	19	21	21
(Germany) S Schrader (Germany) H Wippich	21	18	13

Third round
3	(England) J Austin (England) R Bagga	21	21
(India) V S M Akula (India) M K Rao	9	12
(Denmark) P Busch-Jensen (Denmark) B Sorensen	21	8	21
(Chinese Taipei) Hsiao P-r (Chinese Taipei) Su J-l	19	21	19

Quarterfinals
3	(England) J Austin (England) R Bagga	27	18	16
(Denmark) P Busch-Jensen (Denmark) B Sorensen	25	21	21

=== Bottom half ===
==== Section 3 ====
First round
(Scotland) A McMillan (Republic of Ireland) M Peard	21	21
(Germany) S Lechner (Germany) S Wilde	10	11
(United Arab Emirates) B S Anand (United Arab Emirates) R Sunil	21	21
(France) C Le Garff (France) L Soria	14	13
(Norway) P Bhart (Slovakia) P Scholtz	7	6
(Finland) J Eriksson (Finland) J Hakamäki	21	21
(Belgium) R Hoefkens (Belgium) W Huijs	21	21
(India) G Jeswal (India) K Singh	19	19
(Poland) Z Przyjemski (Poland) S Wikło	21	22
(Switzerland) J-C Bossens (Switzerland) D Cattin	16	20
(England) P Carr (England) K George	17	17
(Russia) A Lugovov (Russia) A Ursov	21	21

Second round
(Scotland) A McMillan (Republic of Ireland) M Peard	21	21
(United Arab Emirates) B S Anand (United Arab Emirates) R Sunil	7	12
(Finland) J Eriksson (Finland) J Hakamäki	15	21
7	(Sweden) M Duvsund (Sweden) J Nordgren	21	23
(Belgium) R Hoefkens (Belgium) W Huijs	21	22
(Poland) Z Przyjemski (Poland) S Wikło	17	20
(Russia) A Lugovov (Russia) A Ursov	12	16
4	(Denmark) J Chistensen (Denmark) H Lykke	21	21

Third round
(Scotland) A McMillan (Republic of Ireland) M Peard	18	21	12
7	(Sweden) M Duvsund (Sweden) J Nordgren	21	11	21
(Belgium) R Hoefkens (Belgium) W Huijs	20	14
4	(Denmark) J Chistensen (Denmark) H Lykke	22	21

Quarterfinals
7	(Sweden) M Duvsund (Sweden) J Nordgren	12	17
4	(Denmark) J Chistensen (Denmark) H Lykke	21	21

==== Section 4 ====
First round
(France) B Capbern (France) D Druelles	21	21
(Czech Republic) P Komarovský (Slovakia) F Šaroch	18	20
(India) P N N Kona (India) V Swaroop	21	22
(Germany) O Binus (Germany) M Brameyer	11	20
(Finland) J Helander (Finland) A Kauppinen	9	8
(Slovakia) D Duralija (Croatia) S Saban	21	21
(Switzerland) B Büsser (Norway) A Skavhaug	14	9
(Sweden) F Ingemansson (Sweden) H Möller	21	21
(Poland) R Bogdański (Poland) P Sobotka	11	10
(Indonesia) P Tan (Indonesia) S H Wahono	21	21

Second round
(France) B Capbern (France) D Druelles	9	8
(India) P N N Kona (India) V Swaroop	21	21
(Slovakia) D Duralija (Croatia) S Saban	8	13
6	(Thailand) W Ampunsuwan (Thailand) N Vanichitsarakul	21	21
(Sweden) F Ingemansson (Sweden) H Möller	21	21
(England) I Richardson (England) T Shearman
(Indonesia) P Tan (Indonesia) S H Wahono	23	19	21
2	(Republic of Ireland) G Henderson (Republic of Ireland) M Topping	21	21	18

Third round
(India) P N N Kona (India) V Swaroop	17	13
6	(Thailand) W Ampunsuwan (Thailand) N Vanichitsarakul	21	21
(Sweden) F Ingemansson (Sweden) H Möller	16	12
(Indonesia) P Tan (Indonesia) S H Wahono	21	21

Quarterfinals
6	(Thailand) W Ampunsuwan (Thailand) N Vanichitsarakul	21	21
(Indonesia) P Tan (Indonesia) S H Wahono	10	16

== Women's doubles ==
=== Seeds ===
1. (England) Betty Blair / Debora Miller (second round)
2. (England) Elizabeth Austin / Caroline Hale (silver medalists)
3. (Denmark) Lene Struwe Andersen / Hanne Bertelsen (quarterfinals)
4. (Scotland) Jill Smith / Aileen Travers (third round)
5. (Japan) Kumiko Kushiyama / Ritsuko Sato (gold medalists)
6. (Sweden) Tanja Karlsson / (Norway) Berit Thyness (bronze medalists)
7. (Denmark) Lise Lotte Bilgrav / Gitte Kruse (bronze medalists)
8. (India) Lali Joseph / Joseph Tessy (second round)

=== Finals ===
Semifinals
6	(Sweden) Tanja Karlsson (Norway) Berit Thyness	11	13
5	(Japan) Kumiko Kushiyama (Japan) Ritsuko Sato	21	21
7	(Denmark) Lise Lotte Bilgrav (Denmark) Gitte Kruse	14	13
2	(England) Elizabeth Austin (England) Caroline Hale	21	21

Final
5	(Japan) Kumiko Kushiyama (Japan) Ritsuko Sato	21	21
2	(England) Elizabeth Austin (England) Caroline Hale	11	15

=== Top half ===
==== Section 1 ====
First round

Second round
1	(England) B Blair (England) D Miller	16	20
(Germany) A Stock (Germany) H Stock	21	22
(Finland) T Luola (Finland) P Petäys	20	21	21
(India) V Agashe (India) K Dixit	22	15	11
6	(Sweden) T Karlsson (Norway) B Thyness	21	21
(Poland) D Gawrońska-Popa (Poland) M Kabarowska	5	5
(Spain) E Barbera (Spain) P Pinto	13	8
(France) R Cazaubon (France) M de Surmont	21	21

Third round
(Germany) A Stock (Germany) H Stock	21	21
(Finland) T Luola (Finland) P Petäys	12	19
6	(Sweden) T Karlsson (Norway) B Thyness	21	21
(France) R Cazaubon (France) M de Surmont	12	10

Quarterfinals
(Germany) A Stock (Germany) H Stock	20	13
6	(Sweden) T Karlsson (Norway) B Thyness	21	21

==== Section 2 ====
First round

Second round
3	(Denmark) L S Andersen (Denmark) H Bertelsen	21	21
(Norway) G Fiskergaard (Slovakia) E Scholtzová	11	10
(India) S Rajgopalan (India) P Tatwawadi	21	21
(Poland) A Brojek (Poland) E Zajac	12	16
5	(Japan) K Kushiyama (Japan) R Sato	21	21
(France) C Bertrand (France) L Renon	6	12
(England) M Joiner (England) L Pearcy	21	17	21
(Belgium) M Loos (Belgium) H Rovers	10	21	12

Third round
3	(Denmark) L S Andersen (Denmark) H Bertelsen	21	21
(India) S Rajgopalan (India) P Tatwawadi	11	12
5	(Japan) K Kushiyama (Japan) R Sato	21	21
(England) M Joiner (England) L Pearcy	19	12

Quarterfinals
3	(Denmark) L S Andersen (Denmark) H Bertelsen	21	17	11
5	(Japan) K Kushiyama (Japan) R Sato	15	21	21

=== Bottom half ===
==== Section 3 ====
First round
(India) S Sawant (India) S Venglet	19	21	21
(France) A Lluch (France) P Valdenaire	21	10	14

Second round
(India) S Sawant (India) S Venglet	15	21	21
(Republic of Ireland) K Ballantine (Republic of Ireland) D McCullough	21	18	15
(England) D Hufflett (England) K Mullen	14	16
7	(Denmark) L L Bilgrav (Denmark) G Kruse	21	21
(Germany) P Mews (Germany) K Tröger	21	21
(Thailand) D Bunnag (Thailand) D Kraitrakul	7	17
(Ukraine) V Pron (Ukraine) M Prysiazhna	21	17	6
4	(Scotland) J Smith (Scotland) A Travers	18	21	21

Third round
(India) S Sawant (India) S Venglet	17	21	16
7	(Denmark) L L Bilgrav (Denmark) G Kruse	21	17	21
(Germany) P Mews (Germany) K Tröger	23	16	21
4	(Scotland) J Smith (Scotland) A Travers	21	21	18

Quarterfinals
7	(Denmark) L L Bilgrav (Denmark) G Kruse	21	22
(Germany) P Mews (Germany) K Tröger	15	20

==== Section 4 ====
First round

Second round
(Denmark) M W Hansen (Switzerland) R Syed	16	12
(Sweden) D Levin (Sweden) A-M Wellendorph	21	21
(Germany) J Bolduan (Germany) J Dudek	21	21
8	(India) L Joseph (India) J Tessy	4	15
(Slovakia) A Eliášková (Slovakia) E Kuttnerová	21	21
(Poland) D Foryta (Poland) S Wachowska	11	13
(Estonia) T Arak (Estonia) K Kordemets	16	8
2	(England) E Austin (England) C Hale	21	21

Third round
(Sweden) D Levin (Sweden) A-M Wellendorph	15	9
(Germany) J Bolduan (Germany) J Dudek	21	21
(Slovakia) A Eliášková (Slovakia) E Kuttnerová	6	12
2	(England) E Austin (England) C Hale	21	21

Quarterfinals
(Germany) J Bolduan (Germany) J Dudek	18	9
2	(England) E Austin (England) C Hale	21	21

== Mixed doubles ==
=== Seeds ===
1. (England) Rajeev Bagga / Elizabeth Austin (gold medalists)
2. (Republic of Ireland) Mark Topping / Dorothy McCullough (quarterfinals)
3. (Indonesia) Puryanto Tan / Rosiana Tendean (quarterfinals)
4. (Sweden) Erik Söderberg / Tanja Karlsson (second round)
5. (Scotland) Alan McMillan / Aileen Travers (quarterfinals)
6. (Denmark) Morten Christensen / Hanne Bertelsen (bronze medalists)
7. (England) Jon Austin / Carolin Hale (second round)
8. (Denmark) Henrik Lykke / Lise Lotte Bilgrav (second round)

=== Finals ===
Semifinals
1	(England) Rajeev Bagga (England) Elizabeth Austin	w	/	o
(Ukraine) Oleksandr Tsyhankov (Ukraine) Viktoriya Pron
(India) Prabhu Naik Naidu Kona (India) Suzanne Venglet	18	21	21
6	(Denmark) Morten Christensen (Denmark) Hanne Bertelsen	21	18	16

Final
1	(England) Rajeev Bagga (England) Elizabeth Austin	21	21
(India) Prabhu Naik Naidu Kona (India) Suzanne Venglet	13	14

=== Top half ===
==== Section 1 ====
First round
(France) D Dahlen (France) R Cazaubon	20	17
(Sweden) P Granberg (Sweden) D Levin	22	21
(Germany) H Wippich (Germany) T Eberl	21	21'
(Lithuania) L Vaškevičius (Estonia) T Arak	13	17
(Poland) J Murach (Poland) A Brojek	4	9
(India) V S M Akula (India) K Dixit	21	21
(Switzerland) B Büsser (Japan) A Arita	21	16	19
(Denmark) J F Jensen (Denmark) M Møller	15	21	21

Second round
1	(England) R Bagga (England) E Austin	21	21
(Sweden) P Granberg (Sweden) D Levin	9	5
(United Arab Emirates) H R Pasumarthi (United Arab Emirates) S Choubal	9	7
(Germany) H Wippich (Germany) T Eberl	21	21
5	(Scotland) A McMillan (Scotland) A Travers	21	21
(India) V S M Akula (India) K Dixit	11	9
(Estonia) R Kristel (Estonia) K Kordemets	21	12	8
(Denmark) J F Jensen (Denmark) M Møller	18	21	21

Third round
1	(England) R Bagga (England) E Austin	21	21
(Germany) H Wippich (Germany) T Eberl	11	12
5	(Scotland) A McMillan (Scotland) A Travers	21	21
(Denmark) J F Jensen (Denmark) M Møller	7	11

Quarterfinals
1	(England) R Bagga (England) E Austin	21	21
(Scotland) A McMillan (Scotland) A Travers	14	16

==== Section 2 ====
First round
(Slovakia) B Kasela (Slovakia) A Eliášková	7	6
(Germany) F Schröder (Germany) P Mews	21	21
(France) L Soria (France) C Bertrand	24	24
(Belgium) R Hoefkens (Belgium) M Loos	22	22
(Poland) W Romańczuk (Poland) E Golańska	9	8
(Ukraine) O Tsyhankov (Ukraine) V Pron	21	21
(Finland) P Salhoja (Finland) T Luola	11	8
(Republic of Ireland) M Peard (Republic of Ireland) K Ballantine	21	21
(Portugal) L Nesbitt (Portugal) A Silva	21	24	13
(England) I Richardson (England) T Dove	15	26	21

Second round
4	(Sweden) E Söderberg (Sweden) T Karlsson	20	17
(Germany) F Schröder (Germany) P Mews	22	21
(India) M K Rao (India) B Bhat	21	18	21
(France) L Soria (France) C Bertrand	15	21	17
8	(Denmark) H Lykke (Denmark) L L Bilgrav	17	20
(Ukraine) O Tsyhankov (Ukraine) V Pron	21	22
(Republic of Ireland) M Peard (Republic of Ireland) K Ballantine	21	21
(England) I Richardson (England) T Dove	18	19

Third round
(Germany) F Schröder (Germany) P Mews	21	21
(India) M K Rao (India) B Bhat	15	19
(Ukraine) O Tsyhankov (Ukraine) V Pron	17	21	21
(Republic of Ireland) M Peard (Republic of Ireland) K Ballantine	21	14	19

Quarterfinals
(Germany) F Schröder (Germany) P Mews	21	17	20
(Ukraine) O Tsyhankov (Ukraine) V Pron	18	21	22

=== Bottom half ===
==== Section 3 ====
First round
(Sweden) H Nilsson (Sweden) L Nilsson	21	17	21
(Germany) T Bunn (Germany) H Bunn	12	21	19
(Switzerland) D Cattin (Switzerland) R Syed	11	14
(Denmark) E Pedersen (Denmark) G Kruse	21	21
(Belgium) W Huijs (Belgium) H Rovers	8	16
(India) P N N Kona (India) S Venglet	21	21
(Finland) J Antila (Finland) P Petäys	21	14	21
(Switzerland) H Mueller (Norway) B Thyness	15	21	17
(Slovakia) I Novak (Slovakia) E Kuttnerová	21	21
(Poland) G Pradela (Poland) D Foryta	19	9

Second round
(Sweden) H Nilsson (Sweden) L Nilsson	15	13
(Denmark) E Pedersen (Denmark) G Kruse	21	21
(India) P N N Kona (India) S Venglet	21	13	21
7	(England) J Austin (England) C Hale	16	21	16
(Finland) J Antila (Finland) P Petäys	21	21
(France) P Talbert (France) B Fosse	19	14
(Slovakia) I Novak (Slovakia) E Kuttnerová	13	13
3	(Indonesia) P Tan (Indonesia) R Tendean	21	21

Third round
(Denmark) E Pedersen (Denmark) G Kruse	16	15
(India) P N N Kona (India) S Venglet	21	21
(Finland) J Antila (Finland) P Petäys	13	11
3	(Indonesia) P Tan (Indonesia) R Tendean	21	21

Quarterfinals
(India) P N N Kona (India) S Venglet	21	21
3	(Indonesia) P Tan (Indonesia) R Tendean	17	16

==== Section 4 ====
First round
(Ukraine) M Stuchynskyi (Russia) O Borisova	14	12
(Germany) S Landwehr (Germany) P Finger	21	21
(Norway) A Skavhaug (Norway) G Fiskergaard	21	21
(Slovakia) P Scholtz (Slovakia) E Scholtzova	7	15
(Finland) J Eriksson (Finland) S Roivainen	21	21
(England) G Pearse (England) C Jowett	19	18
(Poland) R Bieganowski (Poland) E Młynarska	21	21
(France) J C Lempereur (France) E Heuberger	15	19
(Estonia) E Veede (Estonia) M Velga	17	21	21
(Sweden) M Gustafsson (Sweden) A-M Wellendorph	21	16	19

Second round
(Germany) S Landwehr (Germany) P Finger	21	21
(Norway) A Skavhaug (Norway) G Fiskergaard	5	15
(Finland) J Eriksson (Finland) S Roivainen	21	19	16
6	(Denmark) M Christensen (Denmark) H Bertelsen	17	21	21
(Poland) R Bieganowski (Poland) E Młynarska	21	21
(United Arab Emirates) P Ponnengattil (United Arab Emirates) V P Manghnani	17	17
(Estonia) E Veede (Estonia) M Velga	13	13
2	(Republic of Ireland) M Topping (Republic of Ireland) D McCullough	21	21

Third round
(Germany) S Landwehr (Germany) P Finger	21	21	16
6	(Denmark) M Christensen (Denmark) H Bertelsen	10	23	21
(Poland) R Bieganowski (Poland) E Młynarska	18	19
2	(Republic of Ireland) M Topping (Republic of Ireland) D McCullough	21	21

Quarterfinals
6	(Denmark) M Christensen (Denmark) H Bertelsen	21	21
2	(Republic of Ireland) M Topping (Republic of Ireland) D McCullough	16	11
