= Asia Pacific Deaf Games =

International sporting event

Asia Pacific Deaf Sports Confederation
- Formation: 27 March 1988
- Type: Sports federation
- Headquarters: Petaling Jaya, Malaysia
- Members: 28 National Olympic Committees
- Official language: English
- President: (Iran) Mohammad Pargar
- Website: Asia Pacific Deaf Sports Confederation

Asia Pacific Deaf Games
- Abbreviation: APDG
- Frequency: Every four years
- Inaugurated: 1984 Asia Pacific Deaf Football Championship in Hong Kong
- Most recent: 2015 Asia Pacific Deaf Games in Taoyuan, Taiwan
- Next event: 2024 Asia Pacific Deaf Games in Kuala Lumpur, Malaysia

Asia Pacific Deaf Games is a deaf multi-sport event established in 1984 which is held every 4 years in the Asia Pacific region by Asia Pacific Deaf Sports Confederation (APDSC). It is the successor to the "Far Eastern Deaf Football Championship" which was held in Taipei in 1983. The inaugural games was held in 1984 in Hong Kong. At that time, the games was known as the Asia Pacific Deaf Football Championship which was held biennially until 1988. In 1988, the games' governing body Asia Pacific Deaf Sports Confederation was formed during the 3rd Championship in Melbourne, Australia with Ms. Wendy Home as its first administrator. The games changed its name to its present name, the Asia Pacific Deaf Games when the games was held in Seoul, South Korea in 1992 after Asia Pacific Deaf Sports Confederation passed a resolution to change the name of the games, which has since been held once every four years.

== Asia Pacific Deaf Games (APDG) ==
Host cities of the Asia Pacific Deaf Games

Edition	Year	Host city	Host nation	Opened by	Start Date	End Date	Nations	Competitors	Sports	Events	Top Placed Team	Ref.
Asia Pacific Deaf Football Championship
0/1	1984	Hong Kong	Hong Kong	-	18 December	22 December	6	150	1	1	South Korea	
0/2	1986	Kyoto	Japan	-	27 October	1 November	5	120	1	1	South Korea	
0/3	1988	Melbourne	Australia	-	26 March	3 April	5	120	1	1	Kuwait	
Asia Pacific Deaf Football and Table Teniis Championship
0/4	1992	Seoul	South Korea	-	18 April	26 April	10	300	2	3	Japan	
Asia Pacific Deaf Games
1/5	1996	Kuala Lumpur	Malaysia	Siti Hasmah Mohamad Ali	29 March	7 April	16	500	4	43	Japan	
2/6	2000	Taipei	Taiwan	-	30 October	9 November	19	1000	8	72	China	
-	2004	Awarded to Kuwait city, postponed to 2008 and then cancelled due to internal affairs.										
3/7	2012	Seoul	South Korea	-	26 May	2 June	25	1208	14	104	Japan	
4/8	2015	Taoyuan	Taiwan	Mayor Cheng Wen-tsan	3 October	11 October	23	1170	12	113	Japan	
9	2019	Awarded to Hong Kong, cancelled due to 2019–20 Hong Kong protests										
5/10	2024	Kuala Lumpur	Malaysia		1 December	8 December	21		9	112	Iran	
6/11	2028	Gold Coast	Australia		26 July	1 August	21		9	112	India	

- In real 2024 was 5th of this games. 4 first games and 2019 was not games.

== List of participating nations ==
- Australia
- Bangladesh
- Bahrain
- China
- Chinese Taipei
- Hong Kong
- India
- Indonesia
- Iran
- Iraq
- Japan
- Kazakhstan
- South Korea
- Saudi Arabia
- Kuwait
- Kyrgyzstan
- Macau
- Malaysia
- Mongolia
- Nepal
- New Zealand
- Philippines
- Singapore
- Thailand
- East Timor
- United Arab Emirates
- Uzbekistan
- Yemen

== List of Asia Pacific Deaf Games sports ==
- Athletics 1996 -
- Badminton 1996 -
- Baseball (2012 Demonstration sport), 2028 -
- Basketball 2000 -
- 3x3 basketball 2028 -
- Bowling 2000 -
- Cycling 2012 -
- Football All
- Futsal 2012 -
- Judo 2012 -
- Swimming 2000 -
- Squash 2028 -
- Skateboarding 2028 -
- Teqball 2028 -
- Table tennis 1992 -
- Taekwondo 2012 -
- Tennis 2012 -
- Volleyball 2000 - 2012
- Wrestling 2024 -

== Medals (1984-2024) ==
Asia Pacific Deaf Games all-time medal table
Rank	Nation	Gold	Silver	Bronze	Total
1	Japan	98	91	65	254
2	China	85	64	56	205
3	Chinese Taipei	67	61	81	209
4	Iran	65	46	52	163
5	South Korea	59	59	60	178
6	Kazakhstan	19	34	40	93
7	India	13	28	40	81
8	Malaysia	12	11	25	48
9	Macau	8	1	4	13
10	Australia	5	10	11	26
11	Indonesia	5	5	2	12
12	Kyrgyzstan	4	7	8	19
13	Iraq	3	6	5	14
14	Thailand	2	8	3	13
15	Uzbekistan	1	7	9	17
16	Mongolia	1	5	9	15
17	Saudi Arabia	1	2	0	3
18	Kuwait	1	0	4	5
19	United Arab Emirates	1	0	1	2
20	Singapore	0	5	7	12
21	Hong Kong	0	0	7	7
22	New Zealand	0	0	2	2
23	Bahrain	0	0	1	1
23	Philippines	0	0	1	1
25	Bangladesh	0	0	0	0
25	Nepal	0	0	0	0
25	Timor-Leste	0	0	0	0
25	Yemen	0	0	0	0
Totals (28 entries)		450	450	493	1,393

== 1984 Asia Pacific Deaf Football Championship ==
Sports

- Football

Medal table

* Host nation (Hong Kong)

1984 Asia Pacific Deaf Football Championship medal table
Rank	NOC	Gold	Silver	Bronze	Total
1	South Korea (KOR)	1	0	0	1
2	Australia (AUS)	0	1	0	1
3	Kuwait (KUW)	0	0	1	1
4	Hong Kong (HKG)*	0	0	0	0
4	Japan (JPN)	0	0	0	0
4	Malaysia (MAS)	0	0	0	0
Totals (6 entries)		1	1	1	3

== 1986 Asia Pacific Deaf Football Championship ==
Sports

- Football

Medal table

* Host nation (Japan)

1986 Asia Pacific Deaf Football Championship medal table
Rank	NOC	Gold	Silver	Bronze	Total
1	South Korea (KOR)	1	0	0	1
2	Australia (AUS)	0	1	0	1
3	Hong Kong (HKG)	0	0	1	1
4	Japan (JPN)*	0	0	0	0
4	Malaysia (MAS)	0	0	0	0
Totals (5 entries)		1	1	1	3

== 1988 Asia Pacific Deaf Football Championship ==
Sports

- Football

Medal table

* Host nation (Australia)

1988 Asia Pacific Deaf Football Championship medal table
Rank	NOC	Gold	Silver	Bronze	Total
1	Kuwait (KUW)	1	0	0	1
2	South Korea (KOR)	0	1	0	1
3	Australia (AUS)*	0	0	1	1
4	Japan (JPN)	0	0	0	0
4	Malaysia (MAS)	0	0	0	0
Totals (5 entries)		1	1	1	3

== 1992 Asia Pacific Deaf Games ==
Sports

- Football
- Table tennis

Medal table

* Host nation (South Korea)

1992 Asia Pacific Deaf Games medal table
Rank	NOC	Gold	Silver	Bronze	Total
1	Japan (JPN)	2	0	0	2
2	Iran (IRI)	1	0	0	1
3	South Korea (KOR)*	0	2	1	3
4	Chinese Taipei (TPE)	0	1	0	1
5	Australia (AUS)	0	0	1	1
5	Hong Kong (HKG)	0	0	1	1
5	Kuwait (KUW)	0	0	1	1
8	India (IND)	0	0	0	0
8	Indonesia (INA)	0	0	0	0
8	Malaysia (MAS)	0	0	0	0
Totals (10 entries)		3	3	4	10

== 1996 Asia Pacific Deaf Games ==
Sports

- Athletics
- Badminton
- Football
- Table tennis

Medal table

* Host nation (Malaysia)

1996 Asia Pacific Deaf Games medal table
Rank	NOC	Gold	Silver	Bronze	Total
1	Japan (JPN)	17	18	12	47
2	Iran (IRI)	7	5	1	13
3	Malaysia (MAS)*	6	4	7	17
4	Chinese Taipei (TPE)	6	4	6	16
5	China (CHN)	4	1	0	5
6	India (IND)	2	5	6	13
7	South Korea (KOR)	1	2	2	5
8	Australia (AUS)	0	3	6	9
9	Kazakhstan (KAZ)	0	1	4	5
10	Singapore (SIN)	0	0	2	2
11	Kuwait (KUW)	0	0	1	1
11	Macau (MAC)	0	0	1	1
13	Bangladesh (BAN)	0	0	0	0
13	Hong Kong (HKG)	0	0	0	0
13	Indonesia (INA)	0	0	0	0
13	Saudi Arabia (KSA)	0	0	0	0
Totals (16 entries)		43	43	48	134

== 2000 Asia Pacific Deaf Games ==
Sports

- Athletics
- Badminton
- Basketball
- Bowling
- Football
- Swimming
- Table tennis
- Volleyball

Medal table

* Host nation (Taiwan)

2000 Asia Pacific Deaf Games medal table
Rank	NOC	Gold	Silver	Bronze	Total
1	China (CHN)	18	24	16	58
2	Chinese Taipei (TPE)*	18	9	17	44
3	Japan (JPN)	17	12	10	39
4	Iran (IRI)	9	5	2	16
5	South Korea (KOR)	6	2	3	11
6	Malaysia (MAS)	2	2	3	7
7	Thailand (THA)	1	6	3	10
8	India (IND)	1	5	2	8
9	Singapore (SIN)	0	5	5	10
10	Kazakhstan (KAZ)	0	1	0	1
10	Saudi Arabia (KSA)	0	1	0	1
12	Hong Kong (HKG)	0	0	1	1
12	Kuwait (KUW)	0	0	1	1
12	Mongolia (MGL)	0	0	1	1
12	Uzbekistan (UZB)	0	0	1	1
16	Bangladesh (BAN)	0	0	0	0
16	Indonesia (INA)	0	0	0	0
16	Macau (MAC)	0	0	0	0
16	Nepal (NEP)	0	0	0	0
Totals (19 entries)		72	72	65	209

== 2012 Asia Pacific Deaf Games ==
Venues

Seoul

- Seoul Sports Complex
  - Seoul Olympic Stadium - Athletics
  - Secondary/Auxiliary Stadium - Athletics, Football, Closing ceremony
  - Jamsil Students' Gymnasium - Table tennis
  - Jamsil Arena - Opening ceremony
- Olympic Park
  - Olympic Park - Cycling
  - Seoul Olympic Park Tennis Center - Tennis
  - SK Olympic Handball Gymnasium - Futsal
- Others
  - Jamsil High school - Judo
  - Seoul Physical Education High school - Swimming

Gyeonggi Province

- Namyangju Sports Complex
  - Stadium - Football
  - Gymnasium - Badminton
- Tancheon Sports Complex
  - Tancheon Bowling Alley - Bowling
  - Tancheon Secondary Stadium - Baseball (Demonstration)
- Others
  - Korea Armed Forces Athletic Corps Gymnasium - Basketball, Taekwondo
  - Samsung Training Center - Volleyball

Sports

- Athletics
- Badminton
- Baseball (Demonstration sport)
- Basketball
- Bowling
- Cycling
- Football
- Futsal
- Judo
- Swimming
- Table tennis
- Taekwondo
- Tennis
- Volleyball

Medal table

* Host nation (South Korea)

2012 Asia Pacific Deaf Games medal table
Rank	NOC	Gold	Silver	Bronze	Total
1	Japan (JPN)	28	25	17	70
2	China (CHN)	25	12	18	55
3	South Korea (KOR)*	20	28	24	72
4	Chinese Taipei (TPE)	11	21	22	54
5	Iran (IRI)	10	8	10	28
6	Australia (AUS)	3	3	1	7
7	Macau (MAC)	3	0	2	5
8	Indonesia (INA)	2	3	2	7
9	Kazakhstan (KAZ)	1	1	7	9
10	Thailand (THA)	1	1	0	2
11	Iraq (IRQ)	0	1	1	2
11	Uzbekistan (UZB)	0	1	1	2
13	Hong Kong (HKG)	0	0	2	2
13	Kyrgyzstan (KGZ)	0	0	2	2
15	Bahrain (BRN)	0	0	1	1
15	Malaysia (MAS)	0	0	1	1
15	Philippines (PHI)	0	0	1	1
18	Mongolia (MGL)	0	0	0	0
18	Nepal (NEP)	0	0	0	0
18	Pakistan (PAK)	0	0	0	0
18	Saudi Arabia (KSA)	0	0	0	0
18	Singapore (SIN)	0	0	0	0
18	Timor-Leste (TLS)	0	0	0	0
18	United Arab Emirates (UAE)	0	0	0	0
18	Yemen (YEM)	0	0	0	0
Totals (25 entries)		104	104	112	320

== 2015 Asia Pacific Deaf Games ==
Chinese: 2015年亞太聽障運動會; pinyin: 2015 Nián yàtài tīng zhàng yùndònghuì
Officially known as: 8th Asia Pacific Deaf Games (Chinese: 第8屆亞太聽障運動會; pinyin: Dì 8 jiè yàtài tīng zhàng yùndònghuì)
Motto: The Power of Silence (Chinese: 安靜的力量; pinyin: Ānjìng de lìliàng)
Officially opened by: Cheng Wen-tsan (Mayor of Taoyuan)
Athlete's oath: Huang Shu Min (Bowling)
Torch lighter: Wang Shih Wei (Athletics), Peng Si Ting (Taekwondo)

=== Venues ===
- Taoyuan Arena: Opening and closing ceremony, Table tennis
- Taoyuan City Track Field: Athletics, Football
- Luzhu District Badminton Hall: Badminton
- Da Taoyuan Bowling Center: Bowling
- Blue Pond Park: Cycling
- No. 61 Provincial Highway northbound 30-48 km: Cycling (road race)
- National Taoyuan Agricultural & Industrial Vocational High School: Judo, Taekwondo
- National Taiwan Sport University
  - Outdoor tennis court: Tennis
  - Gymnasium: Futsal
- Taoyuan City Swimming Pool: Swimming
- Ming Chuan University (Taoyuan Campus)
  - Gymnasium: Basketball
  - Athletic field: Football
- Central Police University: Football

=== Participating nations ===
- Australia
- China
- Chinese Taipei
- Hong Kong
- India
- Indonesia
- Iran
- Iraq
- Japan
- Kazakhstan
- South Korea
- Saudi Arabia
- Kyrgyzstan
- Macau
- Malaysia
- Mongolia
- New Zealand
- Philippines
- Singapore
- East Timor
- United Arab Emirates
- Uzbekistan
- Yemen

=== Sports ===
- Athletics (30)
- Badminton (6)
- Basketball (1)
- Bowling (12)
- Cycling (4)
- Football (1)
- Futsal (1) *
- Judo (6)
- Swimming (35)
- Table tennis (7)
- Taekwondo (5)
- Tennis (5)

Non-Deaflympics sport is denoted with asterisk (*)

=== Calendar ===
OC	Opening ceremony	●	Event competitions	1	Gold medal events	CC	Closing ceremony

October	2 Fri	3 Sat	4 Sun	5 Mon	6 Tue	7 Wed	8 Thu	9 Fri	10 Sat	11 Sun	Events
Ceremonies		OC								CC	—N/a
Athletics			14	7	9						30
Badminton					●	1	●	●	5		6
Basketball					●	●	●	●	1		1
Bowling				2	2	●	6	●	2		12
Cycling			1	1		1		1			4
Football	●	●	●	●	●	●	●	●		1	1
Futsal					●	●	1				1
Judo								6			6
Swimming							12	12	11		35
Table tennis				●	2	2	1	2			7
Taekwondo			5								5
Tennis			●	●	1	2	2				5
Daily medal events			20	10	14	6	22	21	19	1	113
Cumulative total			20	30	44	50	72	93	112	113	113
October	2 Fri	3 Sat	4 Sun	5 Mon	6 Tue	7 Wed	8 Thu	9 Fri	10 Sat	11 Sun	Events

=== Medal table ===
Key

* Host nation (Taiwan)

Rank	NOC	Gold	Silver	Bronze	Total
1	Japan (JPN)	31	35	24	90
2	Chinese Taipei (TPE)*	29	19	26	74
3	China (CHN)	19	18	14	51
4	Iran (IRI)	14	12	18	44
5	South Korea (KOR)	9	14	14	37
6	Indonesia (INA)	3	2	0	5
7	Macau (MAC)	3	0	1	4
8	Australia (AUS)	2	2	2	6
9	India (IND)	2	0	3	5
10	Kazakhstan (KAZ)	1	6	5	12
11	Mongolia (MGL)	0	2	3	5
12	Iraq (IRQ)	0	2	0	2
13	Malaysia (MAS)	0	1	4	5
14	Uzbekistan (UZB)	0	0	3	3
15	New Zealand (NZL)	0	0	2	2
16	Hong Kong (HKG)	0	0	1	1
16	Kyrgyzstan (KGZ)	0	0	1	1
16	United Arab Emirates (UAE)	0	0	1	1
19	Philippines (PHI)	0	0	0	0
19	Saudi Arabia (KSA)	0	0	0	0
19	Singapore (SIN)	0	0	0	0
19	Timor-Leste (TLS)	0	0	0	0
19	Yemen (YEM)	0	0	0	0
Totals (23 entries)		113	113	122	348

5 Games records were broken, all were from athletics.

=== Athletics ===
Event	Gold	Silver	Bronze
Men's 100m	Takuma Sasaki; Japan	Wang Shih Wei; Chinese Taipei	Sajad Mahpour Ghalehroudkhani; Iran
Men's 200m	Wang Shih Wei; Chinese Taipei	Fumio Mizuno; Japan	Sajad Mahpour Ghalehroudkhani; Iran
Men's 400m	Lin Cheng Hsien; Chinese Taipei	Basim Hadi Majeed; Iraq	Fumio Mizuno; Japan
Men's 800m	Jijo Kuriakose; India	Ahmed Jaber Yahya; Iraq	Ahmad Ravayeh; Iran
Men's 1500m	Yuya Morimitsu; Japan	Chu Chun Che; Chinese Taipei	Hosein Sedaghat Jenagherd; Iran
Men's 5000m	Hosein Sedaghat Jenagherd; Iran	Mehran Sarfaraz; Iran	Farid Zagrutdinov; Kazakhstan
Men's 10000m	Hosein Sedaghat Jenagherd; Iran	Chu Chun Che; Chinese Taipei	Mehran Sarfaraz; Iran
Men's 110m Hurdles	Moslem Shirzad Siboni; Iran	Kotaro Takehana; Japan	Not awarded
Men's 400m Hurdles	Moslem Shirzad Siboni; Iran	Yuji Takada; Japan	Lin Cheng Hsien; Chinese Taipei
Men's 4 × 100 m Relay	Chinese Taipei (TPE); Shih Yen Hung, Wang Shih Wei, Wang Bo Chuen, Lin Cheng Hsien	Iran (IRI); Sajad Mahpour Ghalehroudkhani, Ali Reza Salehichahanjiri, Moslem Shirzad Siboni, Hashem Yadegari	Japan (JPN); Fumio Mizuno, Takuma Sasaki, Daisuke Hashiba, Kaichi Nakamura
Men's 4 × 400 m Relay	Japan (JPN); Daisuke Hashiba, Fumio Mizuno, Takuma Sasaki, Yusuke Okabe	Chinese Taipei (TPE); Shih Yen Hung, Lin Cheng Hsien, Chu Chun Che, Wang Shih Wei	Malaysia (MAS); Danish Abdul Rahim, Muhammad Rawi Kamarzaman, Aidil A. Afifiat, Mohd Shahrul Azmer Azman
Men's High Jump	Mohammadhadi Salehi; Iran	Hiroyuki Maejima; Japan	Ali Reza Salehichahanjiri; Iran
Men's Long Jump	Kodai Nakamura; Japan	Mohammadhadi Salehi; Iran	Yashar Veghar; Iran
Men's Triple Jump	Kodai Nakamura; Japan	Habibollah Kia; Iran	Mohammadhadi Salehi; Iran
Men's Shot Put	Erfan Saffari Ashtiani; Iran	Andrey Nabokov; Kazakhstan	Sajjad Piraygharchaman; Iran
Men's Discus Throw	Sajjad Piraygharchaman; Iran	Reza Heidari Ozomcheloei; Iran	Lin Ken; Chinese Taipei
Men's Javelin Throw	Chiu Yi Hao; Chinese Taipei	Yuta Koseki; Japan	Koji Maejima; Japan
Women's 100m	Midori Kadowaki; Japan	Jamie Howell; Australia	Madina Bekmukhamedova; Kazakhstan
Women's 200m	Midori Kadowaki; Japan	Maryam Abdifard Davil; Iran	Jamie Howell; Australia
Women's 400m	Maryam Abdifard Davil; Iran	Kim Hana; South Korea	Niamh Colvill; Australia
Women's 800m	Hoi Long; Macau	Fumika Tsuchiya; Japan	Maryam Abdifard Davil; Iran
Women's 1500m	Hoi Long; Macau	Maryam Abdifard Davil; Iran	Oh Sang Mi; South Korea
Women's 5000m	Hoi Long; Macau	Oh Sang Mi; South Korea	Not awarded
Women's 4 × 100 m Relay	Japan (JPN); Midori Kadowaki; Fumika Tsuchiya; Marino Sato; Sayuri Tai	Kazakhstan (KAZ); Anastassiya Kozhukalova; Madina Bekmukhamedova; Yana Sibiryakova; Yelena Putintseva	South Korea (KOR); Kang Minah; Kim Hana; Jang Jihyun; Oh Sang Mi
Women's 4 × 400 m Relay	Kazakhstan (KAZ); Anastassiya Kozhukalova; Madina Bekmukhamedova; Yana Sibiryakova; Yelena Putintseva	South Korea (KOR); Kang Minah; Kim Hana; Jang Jihyun; Oh Sang Mi	Not awarded
Women's High Jump	KS Sreejishna; India	Yelena Putintseva; Kazakhstan	Not awarded
Women's Long Jump	Jamie Howell; Australia	Soghra Rabieifard; Iran	Yelena Putintseva; Kazakhstan
Women's Shot Put	Kuo Chia Mi; Chinese Taipei	Mouna Shiritazehgheshlagh; Iran	Yelena Putintseva; Kazakhstan
Women's Discus Throw	Kuo Chia Mi; Chinese Taipei	Hsu An Yi; Chinese Taipei	Parvar Mansouri Yelsouei; Iran
Women's Javelin Throw	Hsu An Yi; Chinese Taipei	Nagisa Takahashi; Japan	Yuki Yamanaka; Japan

=== Badminton ===
Event	Gold	Silver	Bronze
Men's Singles	Shin Kyungduk; South Korea	Woo Jisoo; South Korea	Francis Tan Heng Bock; Malaysia
Men's Singles	Shin Kyungduk; South Korea	Woo Jisoo; South Korea	Kohei Kakiuchi; Japan
Men's Doubles	South Korea (KOR); Shin Kyungduk, Woo Jisoo	Chinese Taipei (TPE); Chen Chung I, Huang Chen Che	India (IND); Abhinav Sharma, Mahesh Singh
Men's Doubles	South Korea (KOR); Shin Kyungduk, Woo Jisoo	Chinese Taipei (TPE); Chen Chung I, Huang Chen Che	Malaysia (MAS); Thomas Teh Cheang Hock, Francis Tan Heng Bock
Women's Singles	Fan Jung Yu; Chinese Taipei	Boon Wei Ying; Malaysia	Shen Yan Ru; Chinese Taipei
Women's Singles	Fan Jung Yu; Chinese Taipei	Boon Wei Ying; Malaysia	Yu Eunkyung; South Korea
Women's Doubles	Chinese Taipei (TPE); Fan Jung Yu, Shen Yan Ru	Japan (JPN); Ayumi Kibayashi, Sumire Takao	Chinese Taipei (TPE); Hsieh Li Chi, Tu Wen Hsuan
Women's Doubles	Chinese Taipei (TPE); Fan Jung Yu, Shen Yan Ru	Japan (JPN); Ayumi Kibayashi, Sumire Takao	India (IND); Neena Udayakumar Vijayakumari, Gauravi Jayant Wamburkar
Mixed Doubles	Chinese Taipei (TPE); Chen Chung I, Fan Jung Yu	South Korea (KOR); Woo Jisoo, Yu Eunkyung	Malaysia (MAS); Francis Tan Heng Bock, Boon Wei Ying
Mixed Doubles	Chinese Taipei (TPE); Chen Chung I, Fan Jung Yu	South Korea (KOR); Woo Jisoo, Yu Eunkyung	Japan (JPN); Tomofumi Kobori, Sumire Takao
Mixed Team	Chinese Taipei (TPE); Chen Chung I, Huang Chen Che, Huang Cheng I, Yin Shih Rong, Fan Jung Yu, Hsieh Li Chi, Shen Yan Ru, Tu Wen Hsuan	Japan (JPN); Kohei Kakiuchi, Tomofumi Kobori, Masaaki Numakura, Ayumu Ohta, Ayumi Kibayashi, Sumire Takao, Mika Yoshida	South Korea (KOR); Heo Taeho, Jung Sunho, Shin Kyungduk, Woo Jisoo, Kim Yunhui, Lee Soyeong, Yu Eunkyung

=== Basketball ===
Event	Gold	Silver	Bronze
Men's team (5×5)	Australia (AUS); Samuel Cartledge, Shane Crick, Jordan Woolmer, Morgan Williams, Benjamin Morrison, Lachlan Jackson, Mark Bilyj, Halil Durnaoglu, Patrick Lane, Callan Brooks	Chinese Taipei (TPE); Chang Chih Hsuan, Chiang Chien Ting, Chiang Chien Ting, Chen Chun Yen, Wu Chin Nien, Chen Wei Yu, Fang Che Wei, Hsieh Chen Yu, Hsu Sheng Chieh, Kuo Tai Yen, Su Yu Cheng, Wu Chi Tao	China (CHN); Sun Liang, Liu Deshuai, Feng Hao, Yang Lifeng, Ma Xiaosheng, Sun Yufeng, Guo Jintao, Wang Bingbing, Hua Jing, Mo Xibin, Xu Bing, Huo Zhineng

=== Bowling ===
Event	Gold	Silver	Bronze
Men's Singles	Hsieh Sheng Fu; Chinese Taipei	Ki Seungmoon; South Korea	Lin Cheng En; Chinese Taipei
Men's Doubles	Chinese Taipei (TPE); Hsieh Sheng Fu; Lin Cheng En	South Korea (KOR); Ham Jonghoon; Seo Youngchun	South Korea (KOR); Jo Youngbum; Han Youngwoo
Men's Trios	Chinese Taipei (TPE); Hsieh Sheng Fu; Lin Cheng En; Chiu Ching Ling	South Korea (KOR); Jo Youngbum; Seo Youngchun; Ham Jonghoon	South Korea (KOR); Yeo Youngwook; Ki Seungmoon; Han Youngwoo
Men's Team of Five	South Korea (KOR); Yeo Youngwook; Jo Youngbum; Seo Youngchun; Ki Seungmoon; Ham Jonghoon	Chinese Taipei (TPE); Cheng Chung Chin; Chiu Ching Ling; Hou Yao Chi; Lin Cheng En; Hsieh Sheng Fu	Japan (JPN); Yozo Nakamura; Hiroo Azuma; Katsumi Ueno; Masafumi Arakaki; Hisashi Umadome
Men's Masters	Hsieh Sheng Fu; Chinese Taipei	Yeo Youngwook; South Korea	Chiu Ching Ling; Chinese Taipei
Men's All-event	Hsieh Sheng Fu; Chinese Taipei	Lin Cheng En; Chinese Taipei	Yeo Youngwook; South Korea
Women's Singles	Kim Jieun; South Korea	Huang Shu Min; Chinese Taipei	Park Sunok; South Korea
Women's Doubles	Chinese Taipei (TPE); Chen Wen Ni; Huang Shu Min	Chinese Taipei (TPE); Hsueh Hsiu Chen; Hu Cheng Mei	Chinese Taipei (TPE); Chang Yao Chien; Lin Ya Chin
Women's Trios	Chinese Taipei (TPE); Chang Yao Chien; Chen Wen Ni; Huang Shu Min	South Korea (KOR); Kim Jieun; Kim Taisoon; Park Sunok	Chinese Taipei (TPE); Hu Cheng Mei; Lin Ya Chin; Hsueh Hsiu Chen
Women's Team of Five	Chinese Taipei (TPE); Chang Yao Chien; Lin Ya Chin; Hu Cheng Mei; Hsueh Hsiu Chen; Chen Wen Ni; Huang Shu Min	South Korea (KOR); Kim Jieun; Kim Taisoon; Cheon Wonryeong; Choi Seonkyeong; Lee Misook; Park Sunok	Japan (JPN); Asami Nakanishi; Miyuki Murano; Miwako Kuriyama; Miyuki Yonekura; Yuka Umadome
Women's Masters	Chang Yao Chien; Chinese Taipei	Huang Shu Min; Chinese Taipei	Park Sunok; South Korea
Women's All-event	Huang Shu Min; Chinese Taipei	Park Sunok; South Korea	Chang Yao Chien; Chinese Taipei

=== Cycling ===
Event	Gold	Silver	Bronze
Men's 1000m Sprint	Liang Qichao; China	Kentaro Hayase; Japan	Sun Yi Feng; Chinese Taipei
Men's Individual Road Race	Cheng Huai; Chinese Taipei	Kentaro Hayase; Japan	Wang Bin; China
Men's Individual Time Trial	Cheng Huai; Chinese Taipei	Reece Emerson Van Beek; Australia	Kentaro Hayase; Japan
Men's Points Race	Kentaro Hayase; Japan	Cheng Huai; Chinese Taipei	Kenta Kawano; Japan

=== Football ===
Event	Gold	Silver	Bronze
Men's team	Iran (IRI); Akbar Sadeghisaroklaei, Hossein Kazemi, Mohammad Pagar, Alireza Basih, Mazaher Shirzad Siboni, Reza Salimihizaji, Seyyedamir Hosseyni, Moslem Taherpour, Ali Zeinalvand, Iman Soleymani, Siavash Zeinalvand, Mohsen Farzikakavand, Ehsan Sheikh Mamoo, Mostafa Rahimferdosinejad, Iman Mohebiabkenar, Morteza Abbasi, Abdolmahdi Hamouri, Esmaeil Arablou, Seyedamin Dehghantezerjani, Reza Rajaeinejad	Japan (JPN); Takumi Matsumoto, Shunsuke Chiba, Hisashi Hosomi, Yoshitaka Ejima, Hiroshi Matsumoto, Sho Kono, Kiyoaki Kiryu, Hiroki Takeuchi, Keita Furushima, Daisuke Nakajima, Ryohei Watanabe, Yuki Yoshino, Toshiki Watanuki, Tomohiro Shiota, Takehide Shitara, Ryosuke Haraguchi, Kodai Hayashi, Kento Nakai, Takehiro Kezuka	South Korea (KOR); Kim Kwangjae, Kim Gihyeon, Lim Sojin, Byeon Jinsub, Jeon Jemin, Jeong Junyeong, Wui Wonjun, Kim Jonghun, Kim Teckhan, Lee Jeonggook, Jung Horeoung, Lee Jaeyoung, Kang Hyeonsu, Nho Sunghyun, Bae Sungjin, Oh Junyoul, Kim Geonoh, Yoo Hochan, Kim Jaeseok, Jung Youngjin

=== Futsal ===
Event	Gold	Silver	Bronze
Men's team	Iran (IRI); Hassan Ebadpour, Majid Kamdoust, Hossein Mesbahi, Esmaeil Shah Zeid, Mohammad Jahangirimoradloo, Mostafa Heydaribondarabadi, Aliakbar Ahmadvand, Seyedesmaeil Dezheh, Aliasghar Mahboubijoghan, Ahmadreza Rezaei, Rouhollah Ebrahimnejadkasmani, Palizi Pourya	Japan (JPN); Masanori Yoshioka, Kyohei Takahashi, Yusuke Yamamori, Hayato Fuse, Nobumasa Matsumoto, Hiroyuki Okuma, Takahiro Yamamoto, Shun Igasaki, Kenta Kojima, Kazuki Uwai, Ryo Umemoto, Tomoki Matsumoto	United Arab Emirates (UAE); Nasser Alhammadi, Saud Al Ali, Salem Alnansoori, Mohamed Alabdouli, Adnan Aljaberi, Musabbeh Alneyadi, Ismail Alhammadi, Hamad Alshehhi, Amer Albalooshi, Dheyab Alameri, Salem Alhajeri, Hassan Mirza, Jamal Almaqbali, Walid Radwan, Ayman Almaqbali

=== Judo ===
Event	Gold	Silver	Bronze
Men's 60 kg under	Ali Salahshour Gol Khani; Iran	Akio Kira; Japan	Shinebayar Baigalmaa; Mongolia
Men's 60–66 kg	Masaki Sato; Japan	Mohammad Asiabi Shafiei; Iran	Munkh Orgil Badamsambuu; Mongolia
Men's 66–73 kg	Hwang Hyeon; South Korea	Kazuma Gamou; Japan	Ali Dehghan Ghourdarband; Iran
Men's 73–81 kg	Kim Minseok; South Korea	Navaanjamts Bayanmunkh; Mongolia	Hossein Allahkarimi; Iran
Men's 81–90 kg	Yang Jungmu; South Korea	Farid Asakereh; Iran	Ochbadral Damdin; Mongolia
Men's 90–100 kg	Mehrdad Seidi; Iran	Baasandorj Davaanyam; Mongolia	Kanalbek Uulu Ilgiz; Kyrgyzstan

=== Swimming ===
Event	Gold	Silver	Bronze
Men's 50m Freestyle	Ryutaro Ibara; Japan	Satoi Fujihara; Japan	Xu Jiahui; China
Men's 100m Freestyle	Cai Jialuo; China	Lim Jang Hwi; South Korea	Han Shang Yu; Chinese Taipei
Men's 200m Freestyle	Satoi Fujihara; Japan	Yoshikazu Kanaji; Japan	Cai Jialuo; China
Men's 400m Freestyle	Satoi Fujihara; Japan	Cai Jialuo; China	Yuta Tsuda; Japan
Men's 1500m Freestyle	Satoi Fujihara; Japan	Yuta Tsuda; Japan	Han Shang Yu; Chinese Taipei
Men's 50m Backstroke	Yoshikazu Kanaji; Japan	Ryutaro Ibara; Japan	Pan Cheng; Chinese Taipei
Men's 100m Backstroke	Yoshikazu Kanaji; Japan	Xu Jiahui; China	Cai Jialuo; China
Men's 200m Backstroke	Yoshikazu Kanaji; Japan	Xu Jiahui; China	Pan Cheng; Chinese Taipei
Men's 50m Breaststroke	Ilham Turmudji; Indonesia	Satoi Fujihara; Japan	Chai Ye Ji; South Korea
Men's 100m Breaststroke	Ilham Turmudji; Indonesia	Wang Zixiang; China	Wan Qicai; China
Men's 200m Breaststroke	Ilham Turmudji; Indonesia	Wang Zixiang; China	Wan Qicai; China
Men's 50m Bufferfly	Ryutaro Ibara; Japan	Ronald Susantio; Indonesia	Yuji Ueda; Japan
Men's 100m Bufferfly	Xu Jiahui; China	Ilham Turmudji; Indonesia	Huang Ching Hsuan; Chinese Taipei
Men's 200m Bufferfly	Satoi Fujihara; Japan	Xu Jiahui; China	Zhang Yidong; China
Men's 200m Individual Medley	Yoshikazu Kanaji; Japan	Ryutaro Ibara; Japan	Wang Zixiang; China
Men's 400m Individual Medley	Satoi Fujihara; Japan	Ryutaro Ibara; Japan	Mehrad Keshavarz; Iran
Men's 4 × 100 m Freestyle Relay	Japan (JPN); Yuji Ueda; Ryutaro Ibara; Satoi Fujihara; Yoshikazu Kanaji	China (CHN); Zhang Yidong; Li Xiao; Cai Jialuo; Xu Jiahui	Kazakhstan (KAZ); Yernar Murzagaliyev; Nurlan Zhassanov; Marat Yermekpayev; Viktor Frundin
Men's 4 × 200 m Freestyle Relay	Japan (JPN); Ryutaro Ibara; Yoshikazu Kanaji; Satoi Fujihara; Yuta Tsuda	China (CHN); Cai Jialuo; Li Xiao; Zhang Yidong; Xu Jiahui	Iran (IRI); Mehrad Keshavarz; Ali Reza Motahari Fard; Ali Mahmoudi Khalkhali; Ghasem Moghiseh
Men's 4 × 100 m Medley Relay	Japan (JPN); Yoshikazu Kanaji; Yusuke Nakagawa; Ryutaro Ibara; Satoi Fujihara	China (CHN); Cai Jialuo; Wang Zixiang; Xu Jiahui; Zhang Yidong	Iran (IRI); Ghasem Moghiseh; Mehrad Keshavarz; Ali Reza Motahari Fard; Ali Mahmoudi Khalkhali
Women's 50m Freestyle	Hu Yuchen; China	Zhu Qian; China	Hoi Long; Macau
Women's 100m Freestyle	Hu Yuchen; China	Huang Xiaofan; China	Kana Imamura; Japan
Women's 200m Freestyle	Hu Yuchen; China	Kana Imamura; Japan	Ami Kawahara; Japan
Women's 400m Freestyle	Hu Yuchen; China	Kyoka Saito; Japan	Kana Imamura; Japan
Women's 800m Freestyle	Hu Yuchen; China	Kyoka Saito; Japan	Kana Imamura; Japan
Women's 50m Backstroke	Tseng Shu Ning; Chinese Taipei	Minami Kubo; Japan	Kana Imamura; Japan
Women's 100m Backstroke	Zhu Qian; China	Ayaka Fujikawa; Japan	Huang Xiaofan; China
Women's 50m Breaststroke	Minami Kubo; Japan	Chen Chuan Ni; Chinese Taipei	Santana Chapman; New Zealand
Women's 100m Breaststroke	Minami Kubo; Japan	Chen Chuan Ni; Chinese Taipei	Xin Yuedan; China
Women's 200m Breaststroke	Minami Kubo; Japan	Xin Yuedan; China	Santana Chapman; New Zealand
Women's 50m Bufferfly	Ayaka Fujikawa; Japan	Chen Chuan Ni; Chinese Taipei	Chen Tzu Ying; Chinese Taipei
Women's 100m Bufferfly	Ayaka Fujikawa; Japan	Huang Xiaofan; China	Hsieh Wan Cheng; Chinese Taipei
Women's 200m Individual Medley	Zhu Qian; China	Kyoka Saito; Japan	Ayaka Fujikawa; Japan
Women's 4 × 100 m Freestyle Relay	China (CHN); Zhu Qian; Xin Yuedan; Huang Xiaofan; Hu Yuchen	Japan (JPN); Rinna Kitajima; Ayaka Fujikawa; Kana Imamura; Kyoka Saito	Chinese Taipei (TPE); Chiang Mei Chu; Tseng Shu Ning; Chen Tzu Ying; Chen Chuan Ni
Women's 4 × 200 m Freestyle Relay	China (CHN); Zhu Qian; Xin Yuedan; Huang Xiaofan; Hu Yuchen	Japan (JPN); Kana Imamura; Ami Kawahara; Ayaka Fujikawa; Kyoka Saito	Chinese Taipei (TPE); Chen Chuan Ni; Hsieh Wan Cheng; Chiang Mei Chu; Chen Tzu Ying
Women's 4 × 100 m Medley Relay	China (CHN); Zhu Qian; Xin Yuedan; Huang Xiaofan; Hu Yuchen	Japan (JPN); Kana Imamura; Minami Kubo; Ayaka Fujikawa; Kyoka Saito	Chinese Taipei (TPE); Tseng Shu Ning; Chen Chuan Ni; Hsieh Wan Cheng; Chen Tzu Ying

=== Table tennis ===
Event	Gold	Silver	Bronze
Men's Singles	Wang Cong; China	Zhang Chaoyue; China	Yang Jung Tsung; Chinese Taipei
Men's Doubles	Chinese Taipei (TPE); Yang Jung Tsung, Wang Yi Hsiung	China (CHN); Wang Cong, Zhang Chaoyue	Chinese Taipei (TPE); Kuo Yueh Tung, Lu Shih Chieh
Men's Team	China (CHN); Li Yunnan, Wang Cong, Xu Youyue, Zhang Chaoyue	Chinese Taipei (TPE); Kuo Yueh Tung, Lu Shih Chieh, Yang Jung Tsung, Wang Yi Hsiung	Japan (JPN); Yoshio Arima, Hirokazu Ito, Yuki Ito, Tatsuya Omuro
Women's Singles	Shi Ce; China	Lin Huan; China	Wang Yutong; China
Women's Doubles	China (CHN); Shi Ce, Niu Xinru	China (CHN); Lin Huan, Wang Yutong	Japan (JPN); Airi Mukuta, Moeka Omuro
Women's Team	China (CHN); Lin Huan, Niu Xinru, Shi Ce, Wang Yutong	Japan (JPN); Mizue Kawasaki, Airi Mukuta, Moeka Omuro, Risato Takaoka	South Korea (KOR); Kim Seoyoung, Lee Ahhyun
Mixed Doubles	China (CHN); Wang Cong; Wang Yutong	China (CHN); Xu Youyue; Niu Xinru	China (CHN); Zhang Chaoyue; Lin Huan

=== Taekwondo ===
Event	Gold	Silver	Bronze
Men's 58 kg under	Lee Hongseok; South Korea	Ayan Abdrash; Kazakhstan	Mohammad Kazemzadeh Falakdehi; Iran
Men's 58 kg under	Lee Hongseok; South Korea	Ayan Abdrash; Kazakhstan	Davron Khidirov; Uzbekistan
Men's 58–68 kg	Behzad Amiri; Iran	Timur Kulessov; Kazakhstan	Oh Wonjong; South Korea
Men's 58–68 kg	Behzad Amiri; Iran	Timur Kulessov; Kazakhstan	Chow Chun Kin; Hong Kong
Men's 68–80 kg	Lee Hakseong; South Korea	Meysam Abedishamsabadi; Iran	Huang Mao Ying; Chinese Taipei
Women's 49 kg under	Peng Si Ting; Chinese Taipei	Kim Heehwa; South Korea	Gulmira Dadajonova; Uzbekistan
Women's 49 kg under	Peng Si Ting; Chinese Taipei	Kim Heehwa; South Korea	Maram Khodabandeh; Iran
Women's 49–57 kg	Marziyeh Khoshahval; Iran	Yelena Salmina; Kazakhstan	Makhfuza Kurbanova; Uzbekistan
Women's 49–57 kg	Marziyeh Khoshahval; Iran	Yelena Salmina; Kazakhstan	Shon Ahreum; South Korea

=== Tennis ===
Event	Gold	Silver	Bronze
Men's Singles	Reiki Kajishita; Japan	Naoto Oyamatsu; Japan	Hiromasa Suzuki; Japan
Men's Singles	Reiki Kajishita; Japan	Naoto Oyamatsu; Japan	Tetsuya Matsushita; Japan
Men's Doubles	Japan (JPN); Naoto Oyamatsu; Hiromasa Suzuki	Japan (JPN); Tetsuya Matsushita; Reiki Kajishita	China (CHN); Tang Xueliang; Yang Zengbao
Women's Singles	Ho Chiu-mei; Chinese Taipei	Lin Chia Wen; Chinese Taipei	She Te Shiun; Chinese Taipei
Women's Singles	Ho Chiu-mei; Chinese Taipei	Lin Chia Wen; Chinese Taipei	Ho Chiu Hsiang; Chinese Taipei
Women's Doubles	Chinese Taipei (TPE); Ho Chiu-mei, Lin Chia Wen	Chinese Taipei (TPE); Ho Chiu Hsiang, She Te Shiun	Japan (JPN); Narumi Murayama, Keiko Toyota
Women's Doubles	Chinese Taipei (TPE); Ho Chiu-mei, Lin Chia Wen	Chinese Taipei (TPE); Ho Chiu Hsiang, She Te Shiun	India (IND); Shaik Jafreen, Parul Gupta
Mixed Doubles	Chinese Taipei (TPE); Wang Chun Wei, Ho Chiu-mei	Japan (JPN); Naoto Oyamatsu, Narumi Murayama	Chinese Taipei (TPE); Lin Chun Jan, Lin Chia Wen
Mixed Doubles	Chinese Taipei (TPE); Wang Chun Wei, Ho Chiu-mei	Japan (JPN); Naoto Oyamatsu, Narumi Murayama	Japan (JPN); Reiki Kajishita, Hanae Yamaguchi

== 2024 Asia Pacific Deaf Games ==
=== Sports (9) ===
1. Athletics (40)
2. Badminton (7)
3. Bowling (12)
4. Table Tennis (7)
5. Football (1)
6. Chess (5)
7. Badminton (7)
8. Judo (16)
9. Taekwondo (13)

=== Medals ===
21 Nations participated.

Rank	NOC	Gold	Silver	Bronze	Total
1	Iran (IRI)	24	16	21	61
2	South Korea (KOR)	21	10	16	47
3	China (CHN)	19	9	8	36
4	Kazakhstan (KAZ)	17	25	24	66
5	India (IND)	8	18	29	55
6	Kyrgyzstan (KGZ)	4	7	5	16
7	Malaysia (MAS)	4	4	10	18
8	Chinese Taipei (TPE)	3	7	10	20
9	Iraq (IRQ)	3	3	4	10
10	Japan (JPN)	3	1	2	6
11	Macau (MAC)	2	1	0	3
12	Uzbekistan (UZB)	1	6	4	11
13	Mongolia (MGL)	1	3	5	9
14	Saudi Arabia (KSA)	1	1	0	2
15	United Arab Emirates (UAE)	1	0	0	1
16	Thailand (THA)	0	1	0	1
17	Hong Kong (HKG)	0	0	1	1
18	Bangladesh (BAN)	0	0	0	0
18	Kuwait (KUW)	0	0	0	0
18	Oman (OMA)	0	0	0	0
18	Yemen (YEM)	0	0	0	0
Totals (21 entries)		112	112	139	363

== ASEAN Deaf Games ==
- 2022 - 1st ASEAN Deaf Games Kuala Lumpur - Malaysia

Medals:

ASEAN Deaf Games all-time medal table
Rank	Nation	Gold	Silver	Bronze	Total
1	Malaysia	15	22	12	49
2	Indonesia	10	12	12	34
3	Singapore	6	0	2	8
4	Thailand	2	3	5	10
5	Philippines	0	4	5	9
6	Brunei	0	0	0	0
Totals (6 entries)		33	41	36	110

== Asian Pacific Deaf Championship ==
1. Athletics
2. Badminton
3. Chess
4. Basketball
5. Bowling
6. Football / Futsal
7. Martial Arts (Karate - Taekwondo - Judo - Wrestling)
8. Table Tennis
9. Baseball

=== Football ===
Winners (Men):

Championship	Location	Gold	Silver	Bronze
1st (1984)	Hong Kong	South Korea	Australia	Kuwait
2nd (1986)	Japan	South Korea	Australia	Hong Kong
3rd (1988)	Australia	Kuwait	South Korea	Australia
4th (2018)	Changwon, South Korea	South Korea	Japan	Iran

Other events:

- 2004 - Malaysia
- 2008 - Thailand
- 2014 _ Iran IRI - KSA - IRQ and JPN
- 2021 Olympic Qual _ Iran IRI - IRQ - UZB and KOR

=== Futsal ===
- 2010 - Singapore
- 4th Men's and 2nd Women's Asia Pacific Deaf Futsal Championship 29 April – 10 May in Tehran, Iran
  - Men: IRI - KUW - JPN
  - Women: JPN - IRI - CHN

== Logos and mascots of the Asia Pacific Deaf Games ==
Logo of the 2012 Asia Pacific Deaf Games

Logo of the 2015 Asia Pacific Deaf Games

Mascot of the 2015 Asia Pacific Deaf Games

== See also ==
- Deaflympics
