= Turkish Wushu Federation =

- Abbreviation: TWF
- Formation: 2006
- Type: Sports federation
- Headquarters: Çankaya, Ankara, Turkey
- Coordinates: 39°56′30.85″N 32°51′15.60″E
- President: Abdurrahman Akyüz
- Affiliations: International Wushu Federation
- Website: http://www.twf.gov.tr/

Turkish Wushu Federation (Turkish: Türkiye Wushu Federasyonu, TWF) is the governing body for wushu in Turkey. It aims to govern, encourage and develop the sport for all throughout the country.

== History ==
TWF has been established in 2006. First president of the TWF is Mehmet Zeki Akıncı. TWF is a member of the International Wushu Federation.

The federation organizes the national wushu events, and European and World championships hosted in Turkey.

== International organizations in Turkey ==
- 13th European Championships, March 6–13, 2014, Antalya
- 1st Mediterranean Championships, November 3–8, 2010, Antalya
- 2011 World Championships, Ankara
