= New Zealand at the Deaflympics =

- IPC code: NZL
- NPC: Deaf Sports New Zealand
- Website: www.deafsports.co.nz
- Medals: Gold 5 Silver 6 Bronze 7 Total 18

Summer appearances
- 1957; 1961; 1965; 1969; 1973; 1977; 1981; 1985; 1989; 1993; 1997; 2001; 2005; 2009; 2013; 2017; 2021

Winter appearances
- 1987; 1991

New Zealand has been participating at the Deaflympics since 1957. New Zealand has earned about 18 medals at the Deaflympic Games.

New Zealand has also competed at the Winter Deaflympics on two occasions, in 1987 and in 1991.

== Medal tallies ==
=== Summer Deaflympics ===
Event	Gold	Silver	Bronze	Total
1957	0	0	0	0
1961	0	1	1	2
1965	0	0	1	1
1969	0	0	0	0
1973	0	0	0	0
1977	0	0	0	0
1981	1	2	0	3
1985	2	1	0	3
1989	1	2	4	7
1993	0	0	0	0
1997	0	0	0	0
2001	0	0	0	0
2005	0	0	0	0
2009	1	0	1	2
2013	0	0	0	0
2017	0	0	0	0

== See also ==
- New Zealand at the Olympics
- New Zealand at the Paralympics
