= Kristina Dovydaitytė =

Lithuanian badminton player (born 1985)

Personal information
- Born: 30 October 1985 (age 40)

Sport
- Country: Lithuania
- Sport: Badminton
Medal record
Women's badminton
Representing Lithuania
Deaflympics
Gold medal – first place	Melbourne 2005	singles
Silver medal – second place	Melbourne 2005	mixed doubles
Bronze medal – third place	Rome 2001	singles
Bronze medal – third place	Melbourne 2005	doubles
Bronze medal – third place	Taipei 2009	singles
Bronze medal – third place	Taipei 2009	team

Kristina Dovydaitytė (born 30 October 1985) is a Lithuanian badminton player. She has competed at the Deaflympics in 2001, 2005 and 2009.

Dovydaitytė clinched a bronze medal during the 2001 Summer Deaflympics in the women's singles, which was her first Deaflympic medal. In the 2005 Summer Deaflympics, she won the women's singles which was also the only gold medal won by her in the Deaflympic career.
