= Turkish Deaf Sports Federation =

- Sport: Deaflympics
- Jurisdiction: Turkey
- Abbreviation: TDSF
- Founded: 1957 and 2000
- Affiliation: CISS
- Headquarters: Cankaya, Ankara
- Location: Cevizidere Caddesi, Cankaya, Ankara
- President: Yakup Kihtir
- Secretary: Ismayil Simsek

Official website
- www.tiesf.org.tr
- (Turkey)

Turkish Deaf Sports Federation is the official national sport governing body of deaf sports in Turkey.

The Turkish Deaf Sports Federation was formed in 1957 and it is affiliated with the Comite International des Sports des Sourds (CISS). The national Deaf Sports Federation is also a member organisation of European Deaf Sports Organization.

The Federation is responsible for sending, funding, supporting Deaf sportspeople representing Turkey at the Deaflympics and in other Deaf Championships, and has sent deaf sportspeople to represent Turkey at the Deaflympics since 1961.

== 2017 Summer Deaflympics ==
The Turkish Deaf Sports Federation was instrumental in hosting the 2017 Summer Deaflympics in Samsun (Turkey), which was also the largest ever Deaflympics event to be held in any nation. This was also the first occasion where Turkey had hosted a Deaflympic event.

Following the event, the President of the Deaf Sports Federation, Yakup Ümit Kihtir thanked the officials who assisted in staging the 2017 Summer Deaflympics in Turkey. He also mentioned that events like Deaflympics would definitely help to improve the quality of sports in Turkey.

== See also ==
Turkey at the Deaflympics

== See also ==
- Turkey at the 2017 Summer Deaflympics
- List of sports governing bodies in Turkey
