= Deaf Sports New Zealand =

- Jurisdiction: New Zealand
- Abbreviation: DSNZ
- Founded: 1963
- Affiliation: CISS
- Headquarters: Wellington

Official website
- www.deafsports.co.nz
- (New Zealand)

Deaf Sports New Zealand (DSNZ) formerly known as the Deaf Amateur Sports Association of New Zealand is the national governing body of Deaf Sports in New Zealand.

The organisation was established in 1963 as a result of an historical New Zealand Deaf Societies Convention Conference in 1963. It is also affiliated with the Comite International des Sports des Sourds (CISS).

== History ==
The New Zealand Deaf Amateur Sports Association (now called as Deaf Sports New Zealand) was formed in 1963 following an historical June 1963 Conference of New Zealand Deaf Societies held in Wellington. The meeting was attended by delegates from Christchurch, Wellington and Auckland.

On 2 June 1963, the delegates unanimously agreed that a national council or a board must be established to deal with the sport activities for the deaf people in the nation. After the successful 1963 Deaf Societies meeting which was held in Wellington, a national sporting body called The New Zealand Deaf Amateur Sports Association (NZDASA) was built.

The New Zealand Deaf Sports Association changed its name as Deaf Sports Federation of New Zealand (DFSNZ) in 2001. In the year 2014, the organisation was renamed as Deaf Sports New Zealand.

== Activities ==
The Federation had to confront new challenges just after its formation in 1963 especially when it found difficulties to finance the New Zealand team to participate at the 1965 Summer Deaflympics which was held in Washington, D.C. An indoor bowls tournament, festival of dancing were conducted by the Federation to raise funds along with other functions.

The national Deaf Sports Federation took the responsibility to send the deaf sportspeople representing New Zealand at the Deaflympics since 1965.
