= Fan Jung-yu =

Taiwanese badminton player (born 1995)

Fan Jung-yu 范榮玉
Personal information
- Born: 7 January 1995 (age 31)

Sport
- Country: Taiwan
- Sport: Badminton
Medal record
Representing Chinese Taipei
Women's badminton
Deaflympics
Gold medal – first place	Sofia 2013	singles
Silver medal – second place	Samsun 2017	doubles
Asia Pacific Deaf Games
Gold medal – first place	Taoyuan 2015	singles
Gold medal – first place	Taoyuan 2015	doubles
Gold medal – first place	Taoyuan 2015	mixed doubles
Gold medal – first place	Taoyuan 2015	mixed team

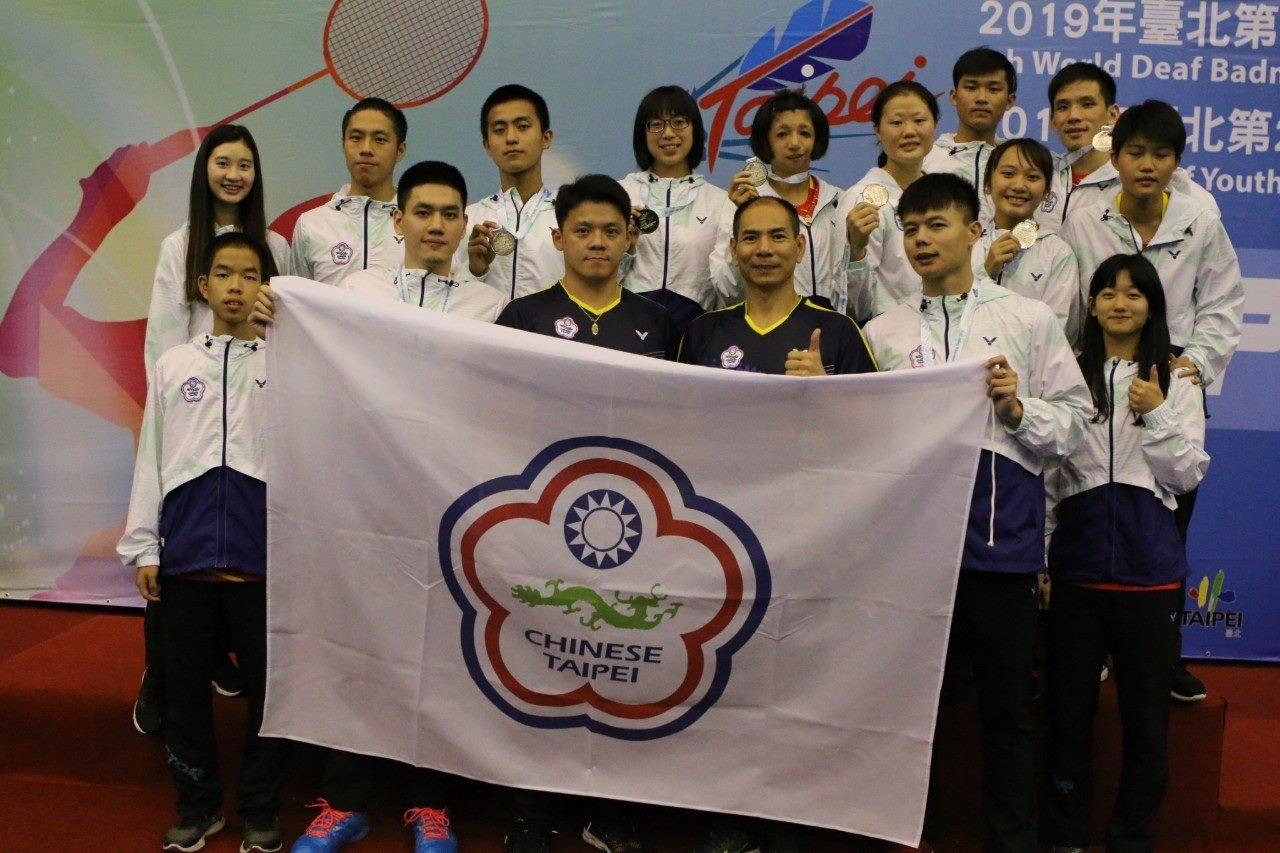
Chinese Taipei team at the 2019 World Deaf Badminton Championships

Fan Jung-yu (born 7 January 1995) is a Taiwanese female badminton player. She represented Chinese Taipei at the 2013 Summer Deaflympics and in the 2017 Summer Deaflympics.

Fan secured her first Deaflympic medal after claiming the gold medal in the women's singles event at the 2013 Summer Deaflympics and also clinched a silver medal in the women's doubles at the 2017 Summer Deaflympics.

Fan is affected with Treacher Collins syndrome since her childhood age and has been confronting with breathing and hearing problems due to Treacher Collins syndrome.
