= Rajeev Bagga =

Indian born deaf badminton player

Rajeev Bagga (born 6 April 1967) is an Indian born deaf badminton player, who represents Britain.

He was Indian national champion, and reached main stage of the 1990 All England Open Badminton Championships, the only deaf person to do so. He has won 12 golds and been singles champion at the Deaflympics from 1989 to 2001, and was named 'Deaflympian of the Century' by the Comité International des Sports des Sourds (International Committee of Deaf Sports) in 2001. In 1991, he won India's highest sports honour, the Arjuna award.

== Life ==
Rajeev comes from an army family. At 12 months, he lost his hearing forever after a severe bout of meningitis.

His father, Brigadier S R Bagga, was an active racquet sportsman. His mother was also a state-level badminton player. His brother and sister are also sportsmen, his brother having played at the national level in squash, and also defeated him in a key badminton finals in 1981.

Initially, Rajeev used to prefer playing squash. In 1981 he won the sub-junior title in squash (at age 13). Subsequently, however, he moved to badminton where "eyesight would be more effective than hearing". He played in the Junior nationals for several years, and won the Maharashtra state level championship five times in a row, and eventually became national champion in 1991.

In 1990, he reached the main stage of the All-England open, defeating the Korean player Ahen Chang in the third round of the qualification.

Despite his deafness, Bagga is also a notable doubles player, and won the national championships in 1997, partnering with Vinod Kumar.

Like most Indian players, he had difficulties with sports officialdom. In 1993 his participation in the Deaflympics was not formalized by the Badminton Association of India and led to considerable controversy.

He remains active in sports, and won the 2008 All-England veteran men's singles (over 40). He narrowly missed his sixth Deaflympics gold in 2009. 2003 and 2007 he won the gold medal in the men's singles at the World Deaf Badminton Championships.

=== Impact of deafness on game ===
His game was affected by not being able to hear the line judge's or umpire's calls. Particularly difficult for him is knowing the score. In one match, he had been mentally counting the score, and thought it had reached 15. As he started walking to the other side, the umpire drew his attention that the match was not over; the score was then 13, and not 15.

Representing the national team or in other team situations, the coaches' exhortations would be completely lost to him. In doubles matches, he cannot hear the shouts of the partner. In one match, the players were being called by the umpire. Though he was present in the arena, he could not hear, and the umpire had decided the match as a default before he could realize.

=== Personal life ===
Rajeev is currently a UK citizen and lives in Coventry, England, where he is a badminton coach. He is married and they have a son together named Rajit Bagga.
