= 1997 Summer Deaflympics =

18th Summer Deaflympics

18th Summer Deaflympics
- Host city: Copenhagen, Denmark
- Nations: 65 countries
- Athletes: 2,028 athletes
- Events: 140 (16 disciplines)
- Opening: 13 July 1997
- Closing: 26 July 1997
- Opened by: John M. Lovett, CISS President
- Main venue: Parken Sport & Entertainment

Summer

Winter

The 1997 Summer Deaflympics (Danish: 1997 Sommer Deaflympics), officially known as the 18th Summer Deaflympics (Danish: 18. Sommer Deaflympics), was an international multi-sport event that was celebrated from 13 to 26 July 1997 in Copenhagen, Denmark.

== Medal tally ==
* Host nation (Denmark)

1997 Summer Deaflympics medal table
Rank	NOC	Gold	Silver	Bronze	Total
1	United States (USA)	28	21	27	76
2	Russia (RUS)	14	15	13	42
3	Germany (GER)	10	15	22	47
4	Sweden (SWE)	9	7	4	20
5	Canada (CAN)	9	4	4	17
6	Iran (IRI)	8	7	3	18
7	Italy (ITA)	6	6	6	18
8	Ukraine (UKR)	5	10	5	20
9	South Africa (RSA)	5	2	2	9
10	Netherlands (NED)	4	6	6	16
11	Australia (AUS)	4	2	3	9
12	Czech Republic (CZE)	4	1	1	6
12	Japan (JPN)	4	1	1	6
14	Denmark (DEN)*	3	4	3	10
15	India (IND)	3	3	1	7
16	Ireland (IRL)	3	2	1	6
17	Great Britain (GBR)	3	1	3	7
18	Finland (FIN)	2	5	2	9
19	Belarus (BLR)	2	2	0	4
20	Yugoslavia (FRY)	2	0	2	4
21	Belgium (BEL)	1	4	3	8
22	Turkey (TUR)	1	3	3	7
23	Greece (GRE)	1	3	2	6
24	Estonia (EST)	1	3	1	5
25	Poland (POL)	1	3	0	4
26	Lithuania (LTU)	1	1	2	4
27	Switzerland (SUI)	1	1	1	3
28	Hungary (HUN)	1	1	0	2
29	China (CHN)	1	0	1	2
29	Kazakhstan (KAZ)	1	0	1	2
31	Norway (NOR)	1	0	0	1
32	France (FRA)	0	2	3	5
33	Chinese Taipei (TPE)	0	2	2	4
34	Romania (ROU)	0	2	1	3
35	Spain (ESP)	0	1	3	4
36	Croatia (CRO)	0	1	0	1
36	Latvia (LAT)	0	1	0	1
36	Moldova (MDA)	0	1	0	1
39	South Korea (KOR)	0	0	2	2
40	Bulgaria (BUL)	0	0	1	1
40	Cuba (CUB)	0	0	1	1
40	Mongolia (MGL)	0	0	1	1
Totals (42 entries)		139	143	137	419

Preceded by 1993 XVII; Sofia, Bulgaria	1997; XVIII; Copenhagen, Denmark	Succeeded by 2001 XIX; Rome, Italy
