= Rebecca Adam =

Australian lawyer and business executive

10th president of Comité International des Sports des Sourds
- In office 2018–2021
- Preceded by: Valery Rukhledev

Rebecca Adam is an Australian lawyer and business executive. She was President of the International Committee of Sports for the Deaf (ICSD) between 2018 and 2019, and also served as a former President of Deaf Sports Australia. On 1 August 2018, she was appointed as the 10th ICSD president, replacing Valery Rukhledev , who was found guilty of embezzlement from the All-Russian Society of the Deaf and was sacked in May 2018. The appointment of Rebecca Adam created further controversy among the deaf sports authorities which cautioned to sue against ICSD in International Olympic Committee. She became only the second woman after Donalda Ammons to be elected as President of the International Committee of Sports for the Deaf.

== Administration ==
Rebecca Adam held the position of ICSD Legal Commission and established the Women in Sports Commission while she was working as President of Deaf Sports Australia. In 2011, after resigning from the position as President of Deaf Sports Australia, she was appointed to the ICSD Board of Directors.

=== ICSD President ===
On 31 July 2018, Valery Rukhledev announced his resignation as ICSD President following the alleged embezzlement of $803,800 from the All-Russian Society of the Deaf for which was reprimanded and arrested for involving in forgery charges while he was serving as the post of the society as well as the post of ICSD President. He was kept in house arrest for more than 2 months until 23 July 2018. He was replaced by Rebecca Adam on 1 August 2018 after being unanimously selected for the position until 2021 during the ICSD committee meeting. However this incident created further controversy as top Deaf sports movements criticised the appointment of Rebecca Adam without proper consent and approval. The arrest of former president, Rukhledev cautioned concerns over Italy in hosting the 2019 Winter Deaflympics but was later confirmed that the games would proceed despite the change in administration. On 13 September 2018, on a press release the newly appointed ICSD President Rebecca Adam confirmed that the 2019 Winter Deaflympics would take place as planned and scheduled during December 2019.
