= Water polo at the Deaflympics =

Water polo is a water sport which has been contested at the Summer Deaflympics on 11 occasions. Water polo was recognised as a sporting event at the Deaflympics for the first time in 1949 with only two nations competing in the event. Water polo was contested only for men in the Deaflympic history and raised question marks regarding the availability of the sport at the Deaflympics.

The ICSD decided to remove water polo from the Summer Deaflympics due to lack of team preparations, decrease of teams, sponsorship issues and due to the dominance of Hungary in the sport. The sport event was last appeared in a Deaflympic competition in 2009.

Hungary is the most successful nation in the sporting event as it claimed 6 gold medals and 3 silver medals.

Reed Gershwind who is considered one of the most decorated Deaflympian has also competed in the water polo events representing United States in 1985, 1993 and 1997.

== Medal winners ==
Games	Gold	Silver	Bronze
1949	Denmark	Sweden	not awarded
1957	Hungary	Netherlands	Italy
1961	Hungary	Netherlands	Germany
1977	Hungary	Italy	West Germany
1981	Hungary	Italy	West Germany
1985	Italy	Hungary	United States
1993	United States	Italy	Germany
1997	Hungary	United States	Italy
2001	Italy	Hungary	Germany
2005	Germany	Hungary	Italy
2009	Hungary	Italy	Germany

== Medal table ==
Rank	Nation	Gold	Silver	Bronze	Total
1	Hungary	6	3	0	9
2	Italy	2	4	3	9
3	United States	1	1	1	3
4	Germany	1	0	6	7
5	Denmark	1	0	0	1
6	Netherlands	0	2	0	2
7	Sweden	0	1	0	1
Totals (7 entries)		11	11	10	32

== See also ==
- Water polo at the Summer Olympics
