= Deaf people in sports =

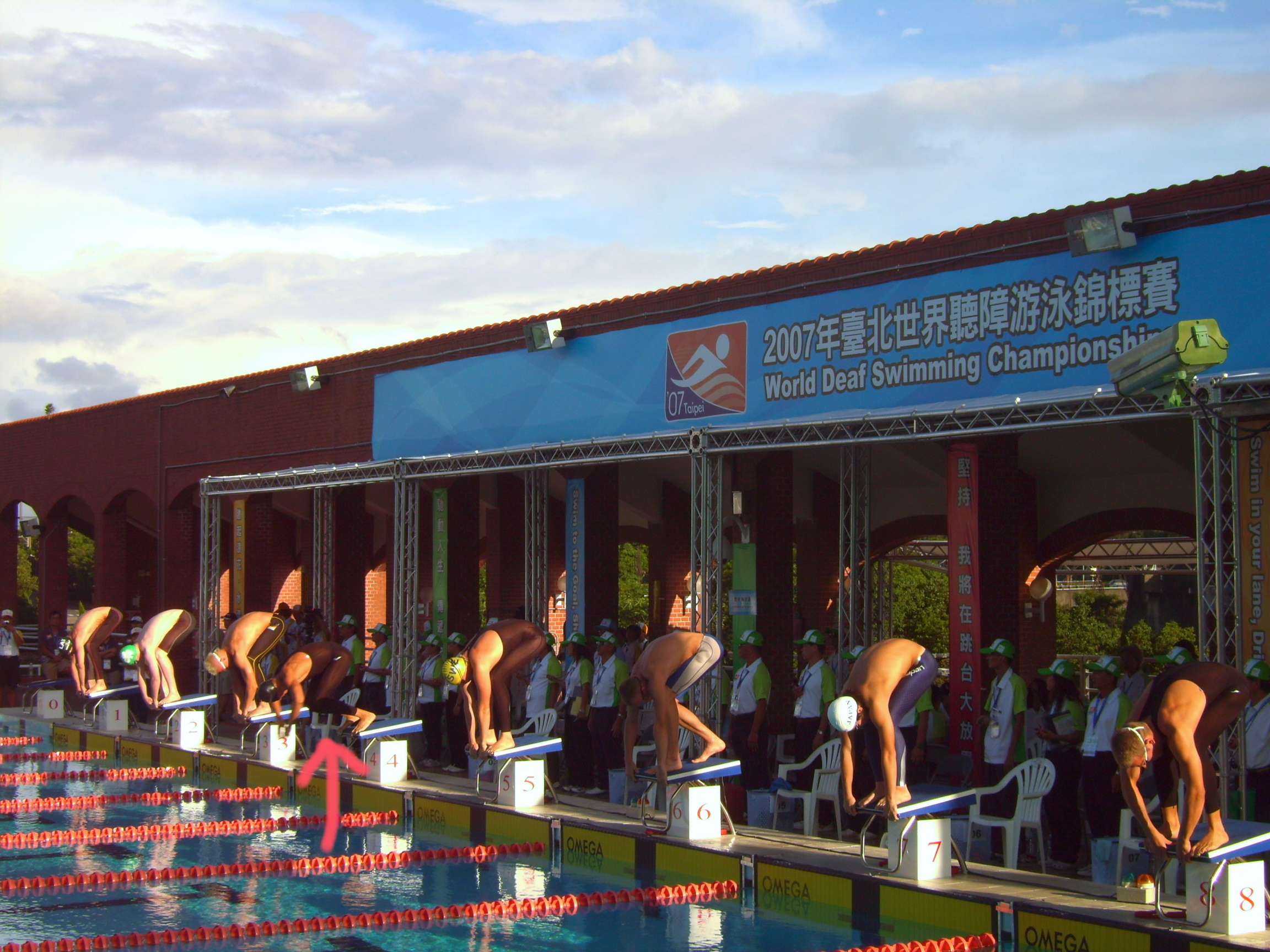
The 2007 World Deaf Swimming Championships

Since the 1920s, Deaf and hard of hearing people have participated in professional sports.

== History ==
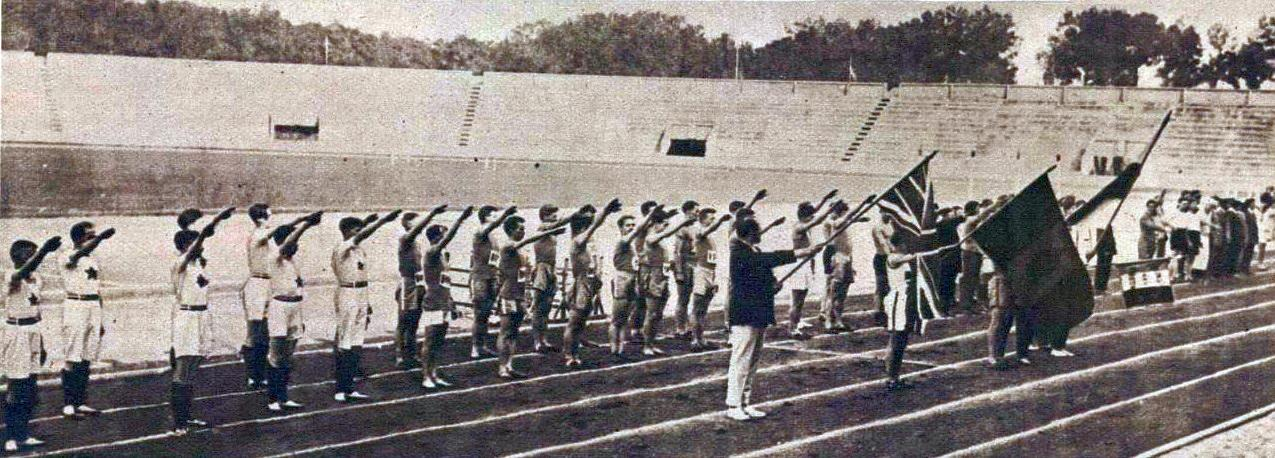
The 1924 inaugural Deaflympics

The first known recognition of Deaf sports was in 1924 known as the International Silent Games. This event was held in Paris and was instituted by Eugène Rubens-Alcais who was a member of the deaf community.

The International Silent Games were created to increase awareness of Deaf culture. Deaf people have been subject to discrimination, so Monsieur Rubens-Alcais and Antoine Dresse pioneer the idea of a Deaf sports competition. The International Committee of Sports for the Deaf (abbreviated as CISS, from French: Comité International des Sports des Sourds) created a pathway for Deaf people can represent their countries on an international stage.

== Impact ==
Deaf sports play a vital role in Deaf culture on physical, social, and mental levels. Many Deaf athletes do not feel disabled in sports and some view their use of sign language as an additional strength.

In individual sports, very little change is typically needed to accommodate athletes. In team sports, Deaf athletes can experience more difficulty, especially when participating on teams with hearing athletes.

Work towards inclusivity for Deaf athletes started largely with the CISS. For many years Deaf people have managed and governed CISS and Deaflympics. Events such as these increase Deaf awareness and promote inclusivity of Deaf people in society.

The representation and inclusion of Deaf people in sports has seen significant progress. The NCAA originally used a whistle or beep to indicate the start of a swimming match. To accommodate for Deaf swimmers, the NCAA switched to a light-system. Before a race begins, the light is red. When swimmers are to start the race, the light switches to green. This light system was created by a student at Gallaudet University, a private university for the Deaf and Hard of Hearing.

== See also ==
- Deaf people in the Olympics
- Deaf basketball
- Deaf tennis
