= Deaf tennis =

Tennis played by deaf and hard-of-hearing people

Deaf tennis is tennis played by deaf and hard-of-hearing people. It follows the standard rules of the game with only minor adaptations, the most significant being that communication between players, coaches and officials is conducted visually rather than by sound. The sport is organised internationally within the structure of deaf sport overseen by the International Committee of Sports for the Deaf (ICSD), and it has been contested at the Deaflympics since the first Games in 1924.

To be eligible for sanctioned competition an athlete must have a hearing loss of at least 55 decibels in the better ear, and hearing aids and cochlear implants may not be worn during play.

== History ==
Deaf people played organised tennis well before the founding of international deaf sport. Matches between deaf players are recorded in Britain as early as 1915, and deaf clubs, championships and national competitions developed over the following decades; the British player Bryan Whalley, a two-time national deaf men's singles champion, later documented this history in his 2010 book The History of British Deaf Tennis.

Tennis was one of the sports at the inaugural International Silent Games — the event later known as the Deaflympics — held in Paris in 1924. Conceived by the deaf French sports administrator Eugène Rubens-Alcais, the Games were the first international sporting competition organised for athletes with a disability, bringing together 148 athletes from nine nations across nine sports. In the tennis events, Great Britain's Owen Bevan Maxwell and John Charles Hyslop won the men's doubles gold medal, and Maxwell also took the silver medal in the men's singles.

The Games have been organised by the International Committee of Sports for the Deaf since 1924 and are held every four years, with an interruption during the Second World War. They are the longest-running international multi-sport event after the Olympic Games.

The Deaflympics grew into a worldwide event. The 2025 edition in Tokyo — the 25th Summer Deaflympics, staged 101 years after the first — drew around 3,000 athletes from some 80 countries, with tennis among the disciplines contested throughout the century-long history of the Games.

== Eligibility ==
Eligibility for deaf tennis is governed by the rules that apply across all ICSD-sanctioned competitions, including the Deaflympics, World Deaf Championships and regional championships. A competitor is defined as deaf if they have a hearing loss of at least 55 dB pure tone average in the better ear, measured as a three-tone average at 500, 1,000 and 2,000 hertz under the ISO 1969 standard. Borderline cases, in the 55–65 dB range, are subject to additional cross-checking.

Beyond the hearing threshold, a competitor must be a citizen of, and a registered member of, an affiliated national deaf sports federation. Each new athlete must submit results on the official ICSD audiogram form, and national federations are responsible for verifying the accuracy and authenticity of their athletes' audiograms. An ICSD-designated audiologist may test athletes at competitions. Where an athlete has a cochlear implant in one ear, that ear need not be tested but must be identified on the audiogram, while the other ear is still assessed. The use of sign language is not a requirement for eligibility.

During warm-up and competition, the use of any hearing aid, amplification device or external cochlear implant component is strictly forbidden. The restriction exists because amplification is considered to confer a competitive advantage, and removing it places all competitors on an equal footing — a contrast with mainstream tennis, where no such limitation applies.

These rules are enforced at the point of accreditation and during the event itself. An athlete found not to meet the 55 dB criterion during accreditation is not accredited; one found ineligible afterwards, whether through a protest or selection for testing, has their accreditation withdrawn and their results disqualified. In individual events, an athlete who wears a prohibited device during official warm-up or competition is immediately disqualified from that event.

== Rules and play ==
Rather than having a distinct rulebook, deaf tennis is played under the standard rules of tennis with only minor adaptations. The most important of these is ensuring that communication between players, coaches and officials is clear and visual rather than reliant on sound.

A number of recurring situations arise from the absence of the audible cues that hearing players rely on. Coaches have identified common examples such as not hearing the net cord when a serve clips the net (a "let") and not hearing line calls or the chair umpire; these are typically managed through visual signals. Such difficulties are most apparent in mainstream tennis, where officiating and scoring conventions are built around audible signals.

In ICSD-sanctioned competition, players compete without hearing aids or cochlear implants (see Eligibility), which further increases their reliance on visual information during play.

Because the sport needs little adaptation in practice, deaf players regularly compete both in dedicated deaf events and alongside or against hearing players in mainstream settings.

== Governance ==
The international governing body for sport played by deaf athletes is the International Committee of Sports for the Deaf (ICSD; also known by its French name Comité International des Sports des Sourds), founded in 1924. The ICSD is recognised by the International Olympic Committee as being of equal standing with the International Paralympic Committee, and it oversees affiliated national deaf sports federations around the world. Beneath the ICSD, regional confederations such as the Pan-American Deaf Sports Organization coordinate competition within their regions. At national level the sport is organised by individual deaf sports federations, in some cases in cooperation with the country's mainstream tennis governing body, such as the deaf tennis pathway operated by the Lawn Tennis Association in Great Britain.

The rules of play used in deaf tennis are those of the International Tennis Federation (ITF); these are applied alongside the ICSD's own technical regulations for the sport, and results from ICSD-sanctioned tournaments contribute to the world rankings that the ICSD maintains for deaf tennis in singles and doubles.

== Competitions ==
=== Deaflympics ===
Tennis has been part of the programme at every Summer Deaflympics since the inaugural Games in 1924, making it one of the sports with the longest continuous presence at the event. The Games are held every four years, and the tennis programme comprises five medal events: men's singles, women's singles, men's doubles, women's doubles and mixed doubles. Detailed results for individual editions are maintained in separate articles, among them Tennis at the 2021 Summer Deaflympics and Tennis at the 2025 Summer Deaflympics.

The sport has been contested at the following editions of the Summer Deaflympics:

Tennis at the Summer Deaflympics
Year	Host city
1924	Paris, France
1928	Amsterdam, Netherlands
1931	Nuremberg, Germany
1935	London, United Kingdom
1939	Stockholm, Sweden
1949	Copenhagen, Denmark
1953	Brussels, Belgium
1957	Milan, Italy
1961	Helsinki, Finland
1965	Washington, D.C., United States
1969	Belgrade, Yugoslavia
1973	Malmö, Sweden
1977	Bucharest, Romania
1981	Cologne, West Germany
1985	Los Angeles, United States
1989	Christchurch, New Zealand
1993	Sofia, Bulgaria
1997	Copenhagen, Denmark
2001	Rome, Italy
2005	Melbourne, Australia
2009	Taipei, Chinese Taipei
2013	Sofia, Bulgaria
2017	Samsun, Turkey
2021	Caxias do Sul, Brazil (held 2022)
2025	Tokyo, Japan

==== 2025 Summer Deaflympics ====
At the most recent edition, the 2025 Summer Deaflympics in Tokyo, the tennis events were played at the Ariake Coliseum from 16 to 25 November 2025. Athletes from seven nations won medals:

Tennis medal table — 2025 Summer Deaflympics
Rank	Nation	Gold	Silver	Bronze	Total
1	Individual Neutral Athletes (AIN) (Note: "Individual Neutral Athletes" (AIN, from the French Athlètes Individuels Neutres) is a designation under which certain athletes competed without national affiliation.)	4	0	0	4
2	Japan (host)	1	1	1	3
3	Germany	0	2	2	4
4	Czech Republic	0	1	0	1
5	Hungary	0	1	0	1
6	Austria	0	0	1	1
7	United States	0	0	1	1
Total (5 events)		5	5	5	15

The medallists in each of the five events were:

Tennis medallists — 2025 Summer Deaflympics
Event	Gold	Silver	Bronze
Men's singles	Dmitry Dolzhenkov (AIN)	Gabor Mathe (Hungary)	Mario Kargl (Austria)
Men's doubles	Vladislav Abramov & Dmitry Dolzhenkov (AIN)	Niklas Koehler & Luca Steen (Germany)	Cedric Kaufmann & Urs Breitenberger (Germany)
Women's singles	Polina Smirnova (AIN)	Heike Albrecht-Schroeder (Germany)	Rina Komokata (Japan)
Women's doubles	Rina Komokata & Riko Suzuki (Japan)	Yuria Miyagawa & Chiaki Sugimoto (Japan)	Chelsie Brown & Emily Hangstefer (United States)
Mixed doubles	Polina Smirnova & Dmitry Dolzhenkov (AIN)	Katerina Blascikova & Jaroslav Smedek (Czech Republic)	Heike Albrecht-Schroeder & Urs Breitenberger (Germany)

==== 2021 Summer Deaflympics ====
The tennis events of the 2021 Summer Deaflympics were held at Caxias do Sul, Brazil, from 3 to 12 May 2022 (the Games having been postponed from 2021). Athletes from seven nations won medals:

Tennis medal table — 2021 Summer Deaflympics
Rank	Nation	Gold	Silver	Bronze	Total
1	Czech Republic	2	0	0	2
2	Chinese Taipei	1	2	1	4
3	Germany	1	1	1	3
4	France	1	0	0	1
5	India	0	1	2	3
6	Hungary	0	1	0	1
7	Italy	0	0	1	1
Total (5 events)		5	5	5	15

The medallists in each of the five events were:

Tennis medallists — 2021 Summer Deaflympics
Event	Gold	Silver	Bronze
Men's singles	Jaroslav Smedek (Czech Republic)	Gabor Mathe (Hungary)	Prithvi Sekhar (India)
Men's doubles	Mikael Laurent & Vincent Novelli (France)	Dhananjay Dubey & Prithvi Sekhar (India)	Cedric Kaufmann & Nils Rohwedder (Germany)
Women's singles	Heike Albrecht-Schroeder (Germany)	Chia-Wen Lin (Chinese Taipei)	Chiu-Mei Ho (Chinese Taipei)
Women's doubles	Chinese Taipei	Verena Fleckenstein & Heike Albrecht-Schroeder (Germany)	Cristina Abrami & Giulia Bassini (Italy)
Mixed doubles	Katerina Blascikova & Jaroslav Smedek (Czech Republic)	Chia-Wen Lin & Chun-Wei Wang (Chinese Taipei)	Prithvi Sekhar & Jafreen Shaik (India)

=== European Deaf Tennis Championships ===
The European Deaf Tennis Championships is the continental championship for deaf players, organised by the European Deaf Sport Organization (EDSO) and contested by its member federations. Together with the World Deaf Tennis Championships and the Deaflympics, it is one of the leading competitions in the sport. Matches are played as best-of-three sets with a tie-break on a single-elimination basis, and the programme includes senior, over-age and youth categories.

The 14th edition was held at the Lyttos Beach Tennis Academy in Chersonissos, Crete, Greece, from 19 to 26 June 2021, having been postponed from 2020 because of the COVID-19 pandemic. Co-organised by the Hellenic Sports Federation of the Deaf, it drew players from 16 nations.

Selected medallists — 14th European Deaf Tennis Championships (Chersonissos, 2021)
Event	Gold	Silver	Bronze
Men's singles	Jaroslav Smedek (Czech Republic)	Gabor Mathe (Hungary)	Marino Kegl (Slovenia)
Women's singles	Anastasia Lasitsa (Russia)	Stasa Sburlovic (Serbia)	Vasiliki Kalogeroulou (Greece)
Mixed doubles	Urs Breitenberger & Heike Albrecht-Schroeder (Germany)	Dmitry Dolzhenkov & Tatiana Koshceeva (Russia)	Jaroslav Smedek & Katerina Blascikova (Czech Republic)

The 15th edition took place at the Sportpark Warmbad-Villach in Villach, Austria, from 22 to 29 June 2024, hosted by the Austrian Deaf Sports Association (ÖGSV); the same week also staged the 2nd European Deaf Tennis Youth Championships.

Medallists — 15th European Deaf Tennis Championships (Villach, 2024)
Event	Gold	Silver	Bronze
Men's singles	Marco Carretta (Italy)	Mario Kargl (Austria)	Olivier Grave (France)
Women's singles	Heike Albrecht-Schroeder (Germany)	Sara Twardowska (Poland)	Katerina Blascikova (Czech Republic)
Men's doubles	Urs Breitenberger & Cedric Kaufmann (Germany)	Olivier Grave & Mikael Laurent (France)	Marco Carretta & Nicolo Della Betta (Italy)
Women's doubles	Valerie Copenhagen & Phoebe Suthers (Great Britain)	Giulia Bassini & Asia Carrara (Italy)	Anne Cointe & Caroline Vidal (France)
Mixed doubles	Jaroslav Smedek & Katerina Blascikova (Czech Republic)	Olivier Grave & Caroline Vidal (France)	Urs Breitenberger & Heike Albrecht-Schroeder (Germany)

Beyond the continental and world championships, national federations stage ICSD-sanctioned open tournaments that award world-ranking points, such as the Slovenian Deaf Tennis Open.

=== National championships ===
At national level, the sport is contested through championships organised by individual federations, such as the Turkish Deaf Tennis Championship and Great Britain's national deaf tennis finals.

== Future ==
The next Summer Deaflympics are scheduled for 2029 in Athens, Greece, which was selected by the ICSD in November 2025 as host of the 26th edition. The successful bid was led by the Hellenic Sports Federation for the Deaf together with the Athens municipality.

== Notable players ==
Barbara Oddone of Italy, who represented her country at the Deaflympics from 1989 to 2013, won 18 Deaflympic medals in tennis, including 15 golds, and was named Deaf Sportswoman of the Year by the ICSD in 1997.

Among players prominent in the modern era, Heike Albrecht-Schroeder of Germany won the women's singles gold at the 2021 Games and took further medals at Tokyo 2025; the Czech player Jaroslav Smedek won the men's singles and mixed doubles titles in 2021; and the Hungarian veteran Gabor Mathe, a long-time national flag-bearer, reached the men's singles final at both the 2021 and 2025 Games.

== See also ==
- Deaflympics
- Deaf basketball
- International Committee of Sports for the Deaf
- Deaf people in sports
