= Donalda Ammons =

American educator and author (born 1953)

Donalda Ammons PhD

7th president of Comite International des Sports des Sourds
- In office 2003–2009
- Preceded by: John M. Lovett
- Succeeded by: Craig Crowley

Personal details
- Born: May 15, 1953 (age 73) Washington D.C., US
- Education: BA in Social Philosophy
- Alma mater: Maryland School for the Deaf; Gallaudet University

Donalda Kay Ammons (born 15 May 1953) is an American teacher and author. She served as a teacher at several deaf schools in the United States. Ammons was also the former President of the Comite International des Sports des Sourds (CISS) from 2003 to 2009.

== Biography ==
Ammons was born on May 15, 1953, and raised in Washington D.C. by an all-deaf family. She graduated from the Maryland School for the Deaf and also went on to teach in that school for three years. In 1970, she attended Gallaudet University and received her BA in Social Philosophy.

In 1996, she was honored as the Gallaudet Distinguished Professor of the Year.

== Services to the deaf ==
As a deaf person herself, Ammons has been an educator in many deaf schools. In 1977, she taught at the Maryland School for the Deaf for three years. She has also taught Spanish in the department of foreign languages and literature at Gallaudet University, a university serving the deaf.

== Deaflympics ==
Ammons had been a member of the Comite International des Sports des Sourds since 1997. She was appointed as the 4th Secretary-general of the CISS in 1997 and was the first woman to hold the position.

Ammons became the 7th president of CISS in 2003, serving first as a stand-in President until 2005 following the death of the existing president, John Michael Lovett. Ammons was officially elected as the 7th president of the Committee in 2005 and became the first woman to be elected President of the CISS. She served as the President of the ICSD from 2003 to 2009.

== Awards and honors ==
- Gallaudet Distinguished Professor of the Year (1996)
- Professor Emerita at Gallaudet University
- Edward Miner Gallaudet Award (1992)
