= Antoine Dresse =

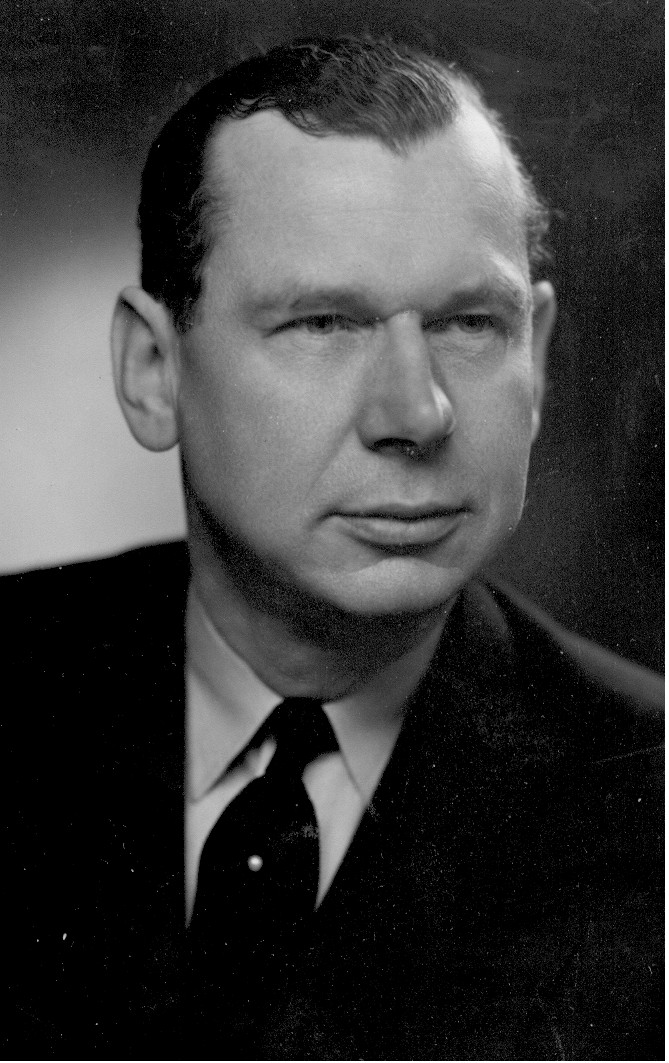

1st Secretary of Comite International des Sports des Sourds
- In office 1924–1967

Personal details
- Born: 1 August 1902 Liège, Belgium
- Died: 13 February 1998 (aged 95) Liège, Belgium

Antoine Dresse
Medal record

Representing Belgium

Deaflympics men's tennis
Gold medal – first place	1931 Nürnberg	mixed doubles
Silver medal – second place	1935 London	mixed doubles
Bronze medal – third place	1924 Paris	doubles
Bronze medal – third place	1924 Paris	singles
Bronze medal – third place	1931 Nürnberg	singles
Bronze medal – third place	1931 Nürnberg	doubles
Bronze medal – third place	1935 London	doubles
Bronze medal – third place	1939 Stockholm	mixed doubles

Deaflympics men's athletics
Bronze medal – third place	1928 Amsterdam	400m

Antoine Dresse (1902–1998) was a Belgian deaf sport activist and the co-founder of the Comite International des Sports des Sourds (renamed as International Committee of Sports for the Deaf), which is the world governing body of deaf sports. Antoine Dresse has also represented Belgium at the Deaflympics from 1924 to 1939. Dresse competed for Belgium in tennis and in the track events. Antoine served as the first founding secretary-general of the CISS (now called as ICSD) from 1924 to 1967.

== Biography ==
Antoine Dresse was born into a family of bankers and industrialists on the 1st of August, 1902 in Liège, Belgium. Antoine was profoundly deaf in his both ears since childhood. He followed the tradition of his family and rose to the top of a brokerage business firm.

== Contributions to promote Deaf Sports ==
Antoine Dresse is considered as one of the pioneers of the deaf sports movement along with the French deaf activist, Eugène Rubens-Alcais. Antoine assisted him in the formation of the International Committee of Sports for the deaf in 1918. He also played a key role to introduce Deaflympics in 1924 and also participated in the inaugural multi-sport event for the deaf people despite holding the post of secretary-general.

Antoine Dresse held the Secretary General post of the Comite International des Sports des Sourds from 1924 to 1967 for about 43 years until his retirement. Dresse had been the key factor in the development of Deaf sports in Belgium.

== Sports career ==
He was also a runner and a tennis player during his young age. Antoine has participated at the Deaflympics in 1924, 1928, 1931, 1935 and in 1939. He won a total of 9 medals in the Deaflympics including a gold medal.

== Awards and honours ==
- Medal of honour (Gold) - 1949
- ICSD/CISS Honorary Member - 1973
- Honorary degree from Gallaudet University (1971)
