= Tennis at the 2025 Summer Deaflympics =

- Venue: Ariake Coliseum, Japan
- Dates: 16–25 November 2025

Tennis at the 2025 Summer Deaflympics was held from 16 to 25 November 2025 at Ariake Coliseum in Tokyo, Japan.

Five medal events were held, consists of two men's events, two women's events and one mixed event.

== Medal table ==
* Host nation (Japan)

Rank	NOC	Gold	Silver	Bronze	Total
1	Individual Neutral Athletes (AIN)	4	0	0	4
2	Japan (JPN)*	1	1	1	3
3	Germany (GER)	0	2	2	4
4	Czech Republic (CZE)	0	1	0	1
4	Hungary (HUN)	0	1	0	1
6	Austria (AUT)	0	0	1	1
6	United States (USA)	0	0	1	1
Totals (7 entries)		5	5	5	15

== Medalists ==
Event	Gold	Silver	Bronze
Men's singles	Dmitry Dolzhenkov; Individual Neutral Athletes	Gabor Mathe; Hungary	Mario Kargl; Austria
Men's doubles	Individual Neutral Athletes (AIN); Vladislav Abramov; Dmitry Dolzhenkov	Germany (GER); Niklas Koehler; Luca Steen	Germany (GER); Cedric Kaufmann; Urs Breitenberger
Women's singles	Polina Smirnova; Individual Neutral Athletes	Heike Albrecht-Schroeder; Germany	Rina Komokata; Japan
Women's doubles	Japan (JPN); Rina Komokata; Riko Suzuki	Japan (JPN); Yuria Miyagawa; Chiaki Sugimoto	United States (USA); Chelsie Brown; Emily Hangstefer
Mixed doubles	Individual Neutral Athletes (AIN); Polina Smirnova; Dmitry Dolzhenkov	Czech Republic (CZE); Katerina Blascikova; Jaroslav Smedek	Germany (GER); Heike Albrecht-Schroeder; Urs Breitenberger
