= 1953 Summer Deaflympics =

7th Summer Deaflympics
- Host city: Brussels, Belgium
- Nations: 16 countries
- Athletes: 473 athletes
- Events: 52 (8 disciplines)
- Opening: 15 August 1953
- Closing: 19 August 1953

Summer

Winter

The 1953 Summer Deaflympics (Dutch: Zomerdeaflympische Zomerspelen 1953; French: 1953 Sourdlympiques d'été;German: Sommer-Deaflympics 1953) officially known as 7th Deaflympics (Dutch: 7e Zomerdeaflympische Spelen; French: 7e Sourdlympiques d'été;German: 7. Sommer Deaflympics) is an international multi-sport event that was held from 15 August 1953 to 19 August 1953. The event was hosted by Brussels, Belgium.

The 1953 Summer Deaflympics saw Australia as the second non-European country to enter. The American team in 1935.

The following countries participated in the 1953 Deaflympics:

- Australia
- Austria
- Belgium
- Denmark
- Finland
- France
- Germany
- (United Kingdom) Great Britain
- Italy
- Netherlands
- Norway
- (Saar Protectorate) Saar
- Sweden
- Switzerland
- United States
- (Socialist Federal Republic of Yugoslavia) Yugoslavia

Preceded by VI; IX; Copenhagen, Denmark	VII; X Brussels, Belgium	Succeeded by VIII; XI; Milan, Italy
