= Jill Diana Lovett =

Personal information
- Born: June 28, 1944 (age 80)
- Spouse: John M. Lovett

Sport
- Country: Great Britain
- Sport: Swimming

Marr Jill Diana Lovett (born 28 June 1944) is a former British female deaf swimmer. She represented Great Britain at the Deaflympics at the 1965 Summer Deaflympics in the women's 100m freestyle and women's 400m freestyle finishing at 5th and 4th places respectively. She was married to the former President of the ICSD, John M. Lovett of Australia until his death in 2003.
