= Australia at the Deaflympics =

- IPC code: AUS
- NPC: Deaf Sports Australia
- Website: www.deafsports.org.au
- Medals: Gold 44 Silver 29 Bronze 31 Total 104

Summer appearances
- 1953; 1957; 1961; 1965; 1969; 1973; 1977; 1981; 1985; 1989; 1993; 1997; 2001; 2005; 2009; 2013; 2017; 2021

Winter appearances
- 1975; 1979; 1983; 1987; 1991–1995; 1999; 2003; 2007; 2015–2019; 2023

Australia has been participating at the Deaflympics since 1953. Australia has earned 104 medals at the Deaflympic Games. Australia became the second country outside Europe to enter Deaflympics when an Australian completed in 1953. Australia has also competed at the Winter Deaflympics on seven occasions since 1975. Barry Knapman was the first to win a medal in 1965 and the first female was Pamela Large to collect the medal in 1977. Due to the COVID-19 pandemic, Australia did not compete in the 2021 Summer Deaflympics.

== Medal tallies ==
=== Summer Deaflympics ===
Host nation

Edition				
(Belgium) Brussels 1953	0	0	0	0
(United States) Washington D.C.1965	1	1	0	2
(Socialist Federal Republic of Yugoslavia) Belgrade 1969	0	1	0	1
(Sweden) Malmö 1973	0	1	0	1
(Romania) Bucharest 1977	1	1	5	7
(West Germany) Cologne 1981	3	3	3	9
(United States) Los Angeles 1985	5	1	3	9
(New Zealand) Christchurch 1989	10	3	9	22
(Bulgaria) Sofia 1993	3	2	1	6
(Denmark) Copenhagen 1997	4	2	3	9
(Italy) Rome 2001	4	1	1	6
(Australia) Melbourne 2005	4	6	3	13
Taipei 2009	2	2	1	5
(Bulgaria) Sofia 2013	1	1	1	3
(Turkey) Samsun 2017	0	0	0	0
(Brazil) Caxias do Sul 2021 -	0	0	0	0
(Japan) Tokyo 2025	1	2	0	3
Total	39	27	30	95

=== Winter Deaflympics ===
Event	Gold	Silver	Bronze	Total
1975	0	1	1	2
1979	2	1	0	3
1983	2	1	0	3
1987	2	1	0	3
1999	0	0	0	0
2007	0	0	0	0

== Athletes in the Summer Deaflympics ==
- 1953: Len Newport (Cycling)
- 1965: Barry Knapman (Diving), Jeffrey Went (Swimming)
- 1969: Barry Knapman (Diving)
- 1973: David Morgan, Julian Walsh (Athletics), Roy Hodgens, John Kemp, Kevin Mitchell (Tennis)
- 1977: Sharon Gargan, Michael Hooppell (Athletics), Donovan Cresdee, Gregory Culpitt, Barry Devers, Terry Furler, Garry Legge, Alastair MacDonald, Colin Mitchell, David Morgan, Dennis Newbound, Wayne Simons (Basketball), Cindy-Lu Bailey, Pamela Large, Wendy Large, Joanne Davis, Geoffrey Scott (Swimming), Shirley Barnfield, Evan Nagorcka (Table Tennis), Edwina Orr, Joyce Sellers, John Kemp, Kevin Mitchell (Tennis)
- 1981: Julian Walsh (Athletics), Geoffrey Nokes, Kenneth Oxley, Ross Rawson, Michael Redman (Shooting), Cindy-Lu Bailey, Annabel Bishop, Christine Ellison-Smith, Pamela Large, Leonie Wright, Geoffrey Scott (Swimming)
- 1985: Dean Barton-Smith, Joanne Lambert, David Wood (Athletics), Melissa Anderson, Michelle Barclay, Anne Bremner, Nicole Davis, Tania Egorov, Helen Jarratt, Kim Kavanagh, Deanne Malden, Dina Maley, Mariane Turcinov (Basketball), Glen Moran (Cycling), Cindy-Lu Bailey, Annabel Bishop, Damien Boulton, David Newton, Geoffrey Scott (Swimming)
- 1989: Dean Barton-Smith, Christine Ellison-Smith, Joanne Lambert, Jennifer Maric, Tracey Micallef, Tim Morgan, Peter Stanhope, John Traves, David Wood (Athletics), Michelle Fogarty, Robert Fogarty, Frank Hoffman (Badminton), Michelle Barclay, Melissa Bryson, Tania Egorov, Elizabeth Findlay, Fiona Goldab, Kerry Hately, Michelle Jackson, Kim Kavanagh, Lisa Kroon, Dina Maley (Basketball-W), Simon Beasley, Kevin Cresdee, David Edwards, Allan Gear, Christopher Gray, Paul Kranenburg, Andrew Kroon, Michael Maggs, Gregory Ophel, Neil Smith, Gary Ware (Basketball-M), Glen Moran (Cycling), Robert Bowler, Steven Burley, Christopher Clarke, Stewart Clayton, Owen Cranney, Emmanuel Finos, Graham Kalms, Michael Katzakis, John Kearney, Anthony Markovitch, Glenn Moir, Neal Moir, Martin Ramadan, Ward Tooker, Ersel Uzelpostaci, Michael Walker (Football), Brian Bernal, Robert Holthouse, Paul Hulands, Kenneth Oxley, Anthony Reid (Shooting), Cindy-Lu Bailey, Annabel Bishop, Damien Boulton, Steven Boyland, Cameron Bradley, Lisa Edwards, Antoinette Harris, Georgina Hook, Tracey Keenan, Elissa Kranitis, David Newton, Bernard O'Donnell, Adam Page, Anthony Young (Swimming), J. Kearney, Deane Morgan, Desmond Morris, Carolyn Noonan (Table Tennis), Maureen Cullen, Ian Francis, Kathleen Jackson, Patricia Knight, Lynette Lock (Tennis), Milton Reedy (Wrestling)
- 1993: Dean Barton-Smith, David Wood (Athletics), Benjamin Hatchard, Barry McFadzean, Glen Moran, Hayden Stephenson (Cycling), Brian Bernal, Robert Holthouse (Shooting), Cindy-Lu Bailey, Tracey Keenan (Swimming), Milton Reedy (Wrestling)
- 1997: Joanne Lambert, Tracey Micallef (Athletics), Julie Barr, Irena Farinacci, Michelle Francis, Marina Gallop, Fiona Goldab, Prudence Harpham, Michelle Jackson, Kim Kavanagh, Lisa Kroon, Siobhan Mason, Andrea Vowles, Tania Wison (Basketball-W), Simon Beasley, Lyndon Borrow, Gavin Connor, Matthew Hayman, Dean Hecker, Damien Hough, Michael Maggs, Daniel Martin, Toby Pattullo, Stewart Power, Samuel Quinn (Basketball-M), John Beasley, Brian Bernal, Kenneth Oxley (Shooting), Cindy-Lu Bailey, Steven Boyland, Wayne Gentles, Rachel Haimes, Amanda Hilton, Bernard O'Donnell, Scott Prosser, Melanie Smith, Kelli Williams (Swimming), Timothy Edwards, Kym Jacob (Tennis)
- 2001: Joanne Lambert, Lauren Hay (Athletics), Lisa Taylor (Badminton), Thomas Andrews, Michael Guminski, Matthew Hayman, Dean Hecker, Damien Hough, Daniel Martin, Toby Pattullo, Stewart Power, Samuel Quinn, Ben Short, David van Namen, Glen Wells (Basketball), Judith Buehow, Sylvia Gusts, David Hayward, Patricia Oxenham, Joan Poynter, Danielle Shaw (Bowling), Aleshia Yet Foy (Swimming), Francis Ma, Carolyn McKnight (Tennis)
- 2005: Dean Barton-Smith, Samantha Coates, Tu Doung, Lauren Hay, Lara Hollow-Williams, Joanne Lambert, Tracey Micallef, Amy Mills (Athletics), Fiona Carroll, Michelle Fogarty, Debra Holman, John O'Dwyer, Lisa Taylor (Badminton), Melissa Bryson, Irena Farinacci, Fiona Goldab, Tanya Hallett, Prudence Harpham, Michelle Jackson, Kim Kavanagh, Kay Lo, Nicola Taschke, Lisa Westwood, Tania Wison (Basketball-W), Thomas Andrews, Wesley Brockett, Bryn Davies, Stephen Ebersberger, Aaron Fitzsimmons, Michael Guminski, Matthew Hayman, Ben Magill, Stewart Power, Samuel Quinn, Shane Taschke (Basketball-M), Tim Clarkson, Callum Farman, Debbie Kennewell, Nina Mishriky (Beach Volleyball), Dean Ainsworth, Adrian Bigham, Jina Chapman, Ron Chapman, Wendy Devlin, David Douglas, Trevor George, Sylvia Gusts, David Hayward, Patricia Loje, Patricia Oxenham, Glenda Smeaton (Bowling), Jarrod Denman, Michael Kennedy, John King, Michael Stankovic, Reece-Emerson van Beek (Cycling), Kim Bondin, Julie Conroy, Nicole Cooke, Diana Cuiffetelli, Alicia Finch, Fiona Fonti, Jennifer Froude, Nicole Humble, Hollie Jessop, Emily McMaster, Cindy Metcalfe, Larissa Monkerud, Bridget Nunan, Nicole Sheppard, Anna Southwell, Joanne Terlizzi (Football-W), Victor Bayas, George Bojlevski, Peter Cincev, Steven Constantine, Peter Dionisopoulos, Nicholas Fonti, Michael Katzatis, John Kearney, Craig King, Michael Lockrey, Stephen Maher, Omar Merhi, Jim Psathas, Nikolas Schlie, Stuart Southwell, Mark Theodossiou, Tony Tran (Football-M), Caine Batten, Andrew Welshe (Orienteering), Gary Brosche, David Ferguson, Geoffrey Nokes, Kenneth Oxley (Shooting), Michael Anderson, Ross Atkinson, Stuart Corstorphan, Daniele Davis, Kymberlee Frizell, Bryce Glover, Megan Grant, Lisa Green, Teneale Houghton, Matthew Keys, Daniel Leighton, Stephanie McDonald, Craig Morgan, Scott Prosser, Anthony Shing, Samantha Taylor, Teigan van Roosmalen, Aleshia Yet Foy (Swimming), Trevor Boyle, Michael Louey, Maureen MacDougall, Desmond Morris, Leslie Noonan, Ida Rogers, Mandy Smith, David Suutari (Table Tennis), Tegan Blanch, Peter Coath, Maree Evans, Glen Flindell, John Lui, Carolyn McKnight, Thomas Pell, Jane Read, Stephen Swann (Tennis), Brian Adam, Gavin Balharrie, Ben Clarke, John Eagle, David Larkin, Jarett Lee, Dean McKenna, Narain Nadarajah, Gregory Ophel, Tony Raynor, Peter Stanhope, David van Namen (Volleyball), Rodney Adams, Damien Boulton, Steven Boyland, David Brady, Brett Casey, Nathan Cleland, Daryl Page, Geoffrey Scott, Costa Tragotsalos, Gary Ware (Water Polo), Milton Reedy (Wrestling)
- 2009: Lauren Hay, Amy Mills, Melinda Vernon (Athletics), Kerry Bevan, Ashleigh Bransden, Tameka Browning, Alicia Finch, Natasha Graysons, Caitlin Johnson, Renee Kahle, Ashleigh Kedge, Nicola Tacshke (Basketball), Jarrod Denman, Reece-Emerson van Beek (Cycling), Jade Collier, Bryce Glover, Teneale Houghton, Chezz Mentesana, Craig Morgan (Swimming), Jacob Dyball, Michael Louey (Table Tennis), Glen Flindell, John Lui, Joshua Sealy, Stephen Swann, Jamie Zafir (Tennis), Milton Reedy (Wrestling)
- 2013: Amy Mills, Melinda Vernon (Athletics), Samuel Cartledge, Shane Crick, Lachlan Jackson, Patrick Lane, Benjamin Morrison, Kenneth Ramos, Scott Uttley, Morgan Williams, Jordan Woolmer (Basketball), Judith Buehow, David Hayward, Andrew Martin, John Russell (Bowling), Lauren Hay, Reece-Emerson van Beek (Cycling), Julie Algie, Monique Beckwith, Teneale Houghton, Craig Morgan, Melinda Vernon (Swimming), Glen Flindell, John Lui, Stephen Swann, Jamie Zafir (Tennis)
- 2017: Jamie Howell, Sekou Kanneh (Athletics), Mitchell Davis (Badminton), Mark Bilyj, Callan Brooks, Samuel Cartledge, Shane Crick, Halil Durnaoglu, Lachlan Jackson, Patrick Lane, Samuel Quinn, Ben Robins, Morgan Williams, Jordan Woolmer (Basketball), Judith Buehow, David Hayward (Bowling), Monique Beckwith, Hannah Britton, Henry Hughes, Alexander Kirchner (Swimming)

== Athletes in the Winter Deaflympics ==
- 1975: John Cole, Andrew Swan, Matthew Veale
- 1979: Andrew Swan
- 1983: Andrew Swan
- 1987: Joanne Samuel, Ian Slinn, Andrew Swan
- 1999: Fiona Crisp, Dean Hecker
- 2007: Dean Hecker

== See also ==
- Australia at the Olympics
- Australia at the Paralympics
