= Australia at the 2017 Summer Deaflympics =

- IOC code: AUS
- NOC: Deaf Sports Australia
- Website: deafsports@org.au

in Samsun
- Competitors: 28 in 5 sports
- Medals: Gold 0 Silver 0 Bronze 0 Total 0

Summer Deaflympics appearances (overview)
- 1953; 1957; 1961; 1965; 1969; 1973; 1977; 1981; 1985; 1989; 1993; 1997; 2001; 2005; 2009; 2013; 2017; 2021

Australia competed in the 2017 Summer Deaflympics which was held in Samsun, Turkey. Australia sent a team consisting of 28 athletes for the event. This was the 15th appearance that Australia took part at the Summer Deaflympics since making its Deaflympic debut in 1953.
