= Deaf Sports Australia =

Governing body of Deaf Sports in Australia

- Jurisdiction: Australia
- Abbreviation: DSA
- Founded: 1955
- Affiliation: CISS
- Headquarters: Melbourne

Official website
- www.deafsports.org.au
- (Australia)

Deaf Sports Australia (DSA), formerly known as Australian Deaf Sports Federation, is the national governing body of Deaf Sports in Australia.

The organisation was established in Adelaide during the 1954/55 Australian Deaf Carnival in January 1955 and it joined the Comite International des Sports des Sourds (CISS) in the same year. Deaf Sports Australia has organised the Australian Deaf Games every three or four years since the summer of 1964/1965 in Sydney.

== See also ==
- Australia at the Deaflympics
