= Craig Crowley =

Eighth President of the International Committee of Sports for the Deaf

Craig Andrew Crowley CBE FRSA (born 1964) is a British Deaflympian and former sports administrator. He served as the 8th President of the International Committee of Sports for the Deaf from 2009 to 2013.

Crowley previously served as a trustee of Signature (the accredited body for British Sign Language qualifications) and the National Register of Communication Professionals working with Deaf and Deafblind People (NRCPD).

He worked as Deputy Director of Community & Care Support Services at the Royal National Institute for Deaf People (RNID) and held a brief role as Executive Director of the European Union of the Deaf (EUD) in 2005.

Crowley is currently Chief Executive of the UK-based Deaf-led charity Action Deafness.

== Early life ==
As a deaf child of hearing parents, Crowley was born in Morpeth but brought up in Cramlington, Northumberland. In the 1980s, he left North-East to move down South where he co-founded the National Leadership Training Programme for both deaf and hearing young people in sport. During his time with Friends for Young Deaf (FYD), he went on to study at Bulmershe College of Higher Education (now part of the University of Reading), where he was elected president of the students’ union. He is regarded as the first deaf president of a students’ union at a higher education institution in the United Kingdom.

In 1987, Crowley founded the National Network of Deaf Students and was one of the organisers of the first European Deaf Students’ Conference, held at the University of Reading in July 1988.

As a sportsman, he represented both club and country in football, winning a silver medal with the Great Britain Deaf Men's Football Team at the 1985 Los Angeles Deaflympics (then known as the World Games for the Deaf). He also gained teaching and coaching qualifications in tennis, cricket, football and mountaineering, and briefly coached the England Deaf Football Team in the late 1990s.

== Involvement in Deaflympics ==
Following the 2001 Deaflympics in Rome, a number of UK deaf organisations and National Deaf Sport Specific Organisations appointed Crowley as Chair of the Deaf Sports Strategy Group in 2002. The following year he co-founded UK Deaf Sport and was elected its first chair in March 2003. Under his leadership between 2003 and 2009, UK Deaf Sport secured membership of both the International Committee of Sports for the Deaf (ICSD) and the European Deaf Sport Organisation (EDSO), and oversaw the preparation of two successful Great Britain Deaflympics teams in 2005 and 2009.

In 2009, Crowley became the first British citizen and Deaflympian to be elected President of the ICSD, at the organisation’s summer congress in Taipei. His presidency coincided with a turbulent period in the ICSD’s history, including the cancellation of the 2011 Winter Deaflympics in Slovakia and the 2013 Summer Deaflympics in Greece. Despite these challenges, he led the Executive Board in restoring the credibility of the Deaflympics and oversaw the staging of the 2013 Summer Deaflympics in Sofia, Bulgaria.

Crowley was succeeded as ICSD President by Dr Valery Rekhledev of Russia in 2013, following the completion of his term. During his presidency, he secured agreements for the hosting of the 2015 Winter Deaflympics and 2017 Summer Deaflympics, and advanced reform proposals for the governance of deaf sport. In September 2013, the ICSD received formal commendation from the International Olympic Committee for its leadership.

He was also instrumental in securing a Memorandum of Understanding between the World Federation of the Deaf (WFD) and the ICSD, which was formally signed in July 2013.

After his presidency, Crowley established the think tank *Efficere Sports International* and has continued to advocate for closer collaboration between the Deaflympics and the Paralympics as part of a long-term international strategy for deaf athletes.

== Other work ==
Crowley was Chair of the UK Council on Deafness from 2016 to 2020, during which he advocated on issues relating to deafness and hearing loss at the All-Party Parliamentary Group level. He has served as a trustee of the Royal School for the Deaf Derby since November 2018. "Trustees – Royal School for the Deaf Derby". Charity Commission. 5 November 2018. He was Honorary President of UK Deaf Sport from 2014 until his retirement from that role at the end of 2022. "UK Deaf Sport Honorary President: Announcing Craig Crowley MBE Retirement and Welcoming Jodie Ounsley". UK Deaf Sport. 6 December 2022.

In November 2022, he was appointed Independent Co-Chair of the British Sign Language (BSL) Advisory Board, working with the UK Government’s Disability Unit. In this role, he and other board members advise and make recommendations on BSL access across government, in line with the British Sign Language Act 2022. "British Sign Language (BSL) Advisory Board: meeting summaries". GOV.UK. 6 August 2025. In September 2025, he presented evidence on behalf of the Board at a meeting of the Women and Equalities Select Committee. He stepped down as Co-Chair in December 2025.

Crowley also serves as Chair of Signapse AI Deaf Advisory Group and is a trustee of DeafKidz International. "Meet the people at the heart of DeafKidz International – Our Board of Trustees". DeafKidz International.

== Awards/Achievements ==
Crowley was appointed a Member of the Order of the British Empire (MBE) in the 2006 Birthday Honours for services to sport. He was elected a Fellow of the Royal Society of Arts (FRSA) in November 2016.

In November 2018, he received the Signature Lifetime Achievement Award in recognition of his contribution to raising the profile of deaf issues and British Sign Language. He was also inducted into the Signature Hall of Fame in December 2023.

Crowley has been awarded a Commander of the Order of the British Empire (CBE) in 2026 Birthday Honours June 2026 for his services to Deaf and Deafblind people.

In September 2026, Crowley published his memoir, Deafining the Silence: A Memoir of Deaf Identity and Leadership. The book explores his upbringing, experiences of Deaf identity and British Sign Language, and involvement in Deaf sport, education and leadership. It also reflects on his work with Deaf-led organisations and the people who influenced his personal and professional development.

Crowley has also been profiled in the BSL Zone documentary *Life Stories*, in which he recounted his experiences from growing up in North East England to becoming President of the Deaflympics.
