= World Deaf Volleyball Championships =

International volleyball competition for deaf people

World Deaf Volleyballl Championships
- Status: Active
- Genre: Sports event
- Date: June–October
- Frequency: Four years
- Inaugurated: 2008
- Organiser: CISS /Fédération Internationale de Volleyball (FIVB)

The World Deaf Volleyball Championships is a quadrennial global competitions in the volleyball sport for deaf people. It is organized by the International Committee of Sports for the Deaf (CISS), and Fédération Internationale de Volleyball (FIVB). It was established in 2008.

== Results ==
Edition	Year	Host	Dates	Nations played	Men			Women			Ref
Edition	Year	Host	Dates	Nations played	Gold	Silver	Bronze	Gold	Silver	Bronze	
1	2008	Argentina, Buenos Aires	1–10 August	13 (M); 9 (W)	UKR	RUS	JPN	UKR	JPN	USA	
2	2012	Bulgaria, Sofia	14–26 August	? (M); 10 (W)	UKR	RUS	GER	UKR	USA	RUS	
3	2016	USA, Washington, D.C.	6–15 July	8 (M); 8 (W)	TUR	UKR	RUS	USA	UKR	RUS	
4	2021	Italy, Chianciano Terme	23 September–2 October	8 (M); 5 (W)	RUS	UKR	ITA	TUR	ITA	RUS	
5	2024	Japan, Tomigusuku	21–30 June	7 (M); 5 (W)	TUR	ITA	UKR	JPN	USA	UKR	

== Medals ==
=== Men ===
Rank	Nation	Gold	Silver	Bronze	Total
1	Ukraine	2	2	1	5
2	Turkey	2	0	0	2
3	Russia	1	2	1	4
4	Italy	0	1	1	2
5	Germany	0	0	1	1
5	Japan	0	0	1	1
Totals (6 entries)		5	5	5	15

=== Women ===
Rank	Nation	Gold	Silver	Bronze	Total
1	Ukraine	2	1	1	4
2	United States	1	2	1	4
3	Japan	1	1	0	2
4	Turkey	1	0	0	1
5	Italy	0	1	0	1
6	Russia	0	0	3	3
Totals (6 entries)		5	5	5	15

== See akso ==
- World Deaf Beach Volleyball Championships
- World Para Volleyball Championships
- Volleyball at the Summer Deaflympics
