= Valery Rukhledev =

Russian wrestler and sports activist (1948–2026)

- Валерий Рухледев

9th President of Comite International des Sports des Sourds
- In office 13 July 2013 – 31 July 2018

Personal details
- Born: 18 January 1945 Rybinsky District, Krasnoyarsk Krai, Russian SFSR, Soviet Union
- Died: 9 April 2026 (aged 81)

Valery Rukhledev
Medal record

Representing Soviet Union

Deaflympics – men's wrestling
Gold medal – first place	1969 Belgrade	freestyle-middleweight
Gold medal – first place	1969 Belgrade	Greco-Roman – middleweight
Gold medal – first place	1973 Malmo	freestyle-light heavyweight
Gold medal – first place	1973 Malmo	Greco-Roman – light heavyweight
Gold medal – first place	1977 Bucharest	freestyle- heavyweight
Gold medal – first place	1977 Bucharest	Greco-Roman – heavyweight

Valery Nikititch Rukhledev (Russian: Валерий Никитич Рухледев; 18 January 1945 – 9 April 2026) was a Russian sports activist and a six-time gold medalist in wrestling for the Soviet Union at the Deaflympics from 1969 to 1977. He served as the president of the Comite International des Sports des Sourds (International Committee of Sports for the Deaf (ICSD), in English) from 2013 to 2018. He retired from the position as President of ICSD on 31 July 2018 after being charged on embezzlement charges in a corruption scandal, in which he was accused of embezzling $803,800 from the All-Russian Society of the Deaf. He was later replaced by Australian Rebecca Adam as ICSD President on 1 August 2018 which created further controversy in the Deaf sports world.

== Background ==
Born on 18 January 1945 in Krasnoyarsk Krai, Russian Soviet Federated Socialist Republic, Rukhledev studied at deaf schools in Novokuznetsk, Kemerovo Oblast and in Odessa, Ukrainian Soviet Socialist Republic.

Rukhledev died on 9 April 2026, at the age of 81.

== Sports career ==
Rukhledev was a 6-time champion in men's wrestling at the Deaflympics from 1969 to 1977. He represented the Soviet Union in 1969, 1973, and in 1977. He was voted as one of the best deaf athletes across the world of the 20th century.

In addition to wrestling, he specialized in other martial arts such as Judo and Sambo. Rukhledev was the Soviet national champion at the 1971 Sambo Championship.

== Administration ==
In 1993, he founded the Sports Union for the Deaf in Russia after the dissolution of the Soviet Union and served as the first President of the Federation.

He was until his death a member of the Russian Presidential Council on People with Disabilities, headed by Vladimir Putin.

In 2013, he was elected as the 9th President of the International Committee of Sports for the Deaf (ICSD). Rukhledev also ran for the Presidential post in 2005 and 2009.

- President of All-Russian Society of the Deaf (2003–2018)
- Chairman of the Russian Committee of Deaf Sports (2010–2013)
- Member of the World Federation of the Deaf (2007–2011)
- President of the ICSD (2013–2018)

== Allegations ==
In May 2018, he was reprimanded and arrested for involving in forgery charges regarding the embezzlement of $803,800 from the All-Russian Society of the Deaf while he was serving as the post of the society as well as the post of ICSD President. He was kept under house arrest for more than 2 months until 23 July 2018. While he was under house arrest, Kang Chen, one of the key members of ICSD, was appointed the acting President of International Committee of Sports for the Deaf. On 31 July 2018, he announced his resignation as ICSD President following the scandal and was replaced by Rebecca Adam on 1 August 2018 after being unanimously selected for the position until 2021 during the ICSD committee meeting. However this incident created further controversy as top Deaf sports movements criticised the appointment of Rebecca Adam without proper consent and approval. The arrest of former president, Rukhledev cautioned concerns over Italy in hosting the 2019 Winter Deaflympics but was later confirmed that the games would proceed despite the change in administration.

== Awards and honours ==
- One of the top 10 ICSD/ Deaflympics athletes of the Century Recipients
- Edward Miner Gallaudet Award at the Gallaudet University (2016)
- Doctorate in Philosophy from Moscow University
