= Emily Hangstefer =

American tennis player

- Country (sports): United States
- Born: 26 October 1989 (age 36) Signal Mountain, Tennessee, U.S.
- Plays: right handed
Medal record
Deaflympics
| Gold medal – first place | Sofia 2013 | doubles |
| Silver medal – second place | Sofia 2013 | mixed doubles |

Emily Hangstefer (born 26 October 1989) is an American deaf tennis player. She has competed at the 2013 Summer Deaflympics which was held in Sofia, Bulgaria.

== Biography ==
Hangstefer is the youngest of six children who grew up among a tennis playing family in Signal Mountain, Tennessee. She and her two elder brothers, Jim and Daniel, were born deaf. Emily has had 58-decibel hearing loss in both ears since childhood. She graduated from the University of Tennessee in Chattanooga. During her youth she used to play tennis with her elder brother, Daniel.

In 2014, Hangstefer became the first tennis player to win the USA Deaf Sports Federation's Sportswoman of the Year Award.

== 2013 Summer Deaflympics ==
At the 2013 Summer Deaflympics, she won the women's doubles title along with fellow emerging American deaf tennis player, Laura Chapman. They defeated the second seeded Chinese deaf tennis players, Ho Chiu-mei and Hsiu-Hsiang Ho in straight sets (6–4, 6–1).

Hangstefer partnered with her elder brother, Daniel, who is also a tennis coach in mixed doubles, and secured the silver medal in the event.

== See also ==
- United States at the Deaflympics
