= Mario Kargl =

Austrian tennis player

- Country (sports): Austria
- Born: May 14, 1986 (age 40)
- Plays: right-handed
- Coach: Roland Berger

Singles
- Career record: 0/1

Doubles
- Career record: 5/7
Medal record
Representing Austria
Men's Tennis
Deaflympics
Bronze medal – third place	Taipei 2009	doubles
Bronze medal – third place	Sofia 2013	singles
Bronze medal – third place	Sofia 2013	doubles
Bronze medal – third place	Samsun 2017	doubles

Mario Kargl (born 14 May 1986) is an Austrian male professional tennis player. He was a former world no. 1 deaf tennis player and a former world champion at the Deaf tennis Championship in 2011. He has represented Austria at the Deaflympics in 2005, 2009, 2013 and 2017. He has clinched a medal haul of 4 bronze medals in his Deaflympic career after making his debut at the multi-sport event at the 2005 Summer Deaflympics at the age of 19.

== Career ==
Mario Kargl was named as one of the members of the Austrian delegation for the Melbourne Deaflympics and took part in the men's singles and doubles events but couldn't manage to proceed beyond the group stage after being knocked out of the first round. He again went onto participate at the Deaflympics after gaining the opportunity to represent Austria at the 2009 Summer Deaflympics. At the 2009 Deaflympics, he claimed his maiden Deaflympic medal after clinching a bronze medal in the men's doubles event partnering with Daniel Erlbacher, who also managed to claim his first Deaflympic medal.

Mario Kargl also claimed bronze medals at the men's singles and doubles events during the 2013 Summer Deaflympics. He claimed his third successive bronze medal in the men's doubles event at the 2017 Summer Deaflympics, marking his fourth Deaflympic medal. Mario has also participated at the ITF tennis competitions despite being deaf especially achieving a silver medal in the men's doubles at the 2011 ITF Men's Circuit (July–September). He was nominated for the ICSD Deaf Sportsperson of the Year in 2010.
