= Cindy-Lu Bailey =

Australian swimmer

Personal information
- National team: Australia
- Born: 8 March 1965 (age 61) Liverpool, Australia

Sport
- Country: Australia
- Sport: Swimming
- Club: Cabramatta NSW
Medal record
Women's swimming
Representing Australia
World Deaf Swimming Championships
Gold medal – first place	1995 Bugge	100m breaststroke
Event / 1st / 2nd / 3rd; Deaflympics / 19 / 5 / 5
Deaflympics
Gold medal – first place	Koln 1981	100m breaststroke
Gold medal – first place	Koln 1981	200m breaststroke
Gold medal – first place	Los Angeles 1985	100m breaststroke
Gold medal – first place	Los Angeles 1985	200m breaststroke
Gold medal – first place	Los Angeles 1985	200m freestyle
Gold medal – first place	Los Angeles 1985	200m individual medley
Gold medal – first place	Los Angeles 1985	400m individual medley
Gold medal – first place	Christchurch 1989	100m breaststroke
Gold medal – first place	Christchurch 1989	200m breaststroke
Gold medal – first place	Christchurch 1989	200m freestyle
Gold medal – first place	Christchurch 1989	200m individual medley
Gold medal – first place	Christchurch 1989	400m freestyle
Gold medal – first place	Christchurch 1989	4 × 100m medley relay
Gold medal – first place	Christchurch 1989	800m freestyle
Gold medal – first place	Sofia 1993	100m freestyle
Gold medal – first place	Sofia 1993	200m freestyle
Gold medal – first place	Copenhagen 1997	100m breaststroke
Gold medal – first place	Copenhagen 1997	200m breaststroke
Gold medal – first place	Copenhagen 1997	4 × 100m medley relay
Silver medal – second place	Koln 1981	400m freestyle
Silver medal – second place	Koln 1981	4 × 100m freestyle relay
Silver medal – second place	Koln 1981	4 × 100m medley relay
Silver medal – second place	Christchurch 1989	400m individual medley
Silver medal – second place	Copenhagen 1997	200m individual medley
Bronze medal – third place	Bucharest 1977	4 × 100m medley relay
Bronze medal – third place	Koln 1981	200m freestyle
Bronze medal – third place	Christchurch 1989	4 × 100m freestyle relay
Bronze medal – third place	Christchurch 1989	50m freestyle
Bronze medal – third place	Copenhagen 1997	4 × 100m freestyle relay

Cindy-Lu Bailey OAM, also known as Cindy-Lu Fitzpatrick, (born 8 March 1965) is a former Australian deaf swimmer who has represented Australia in both Commonwealth Games and in Deaflympics. She is considered to be the most decorated woman in Deaflympics history with a record haul of 29 medals, which is the highest among women in Deaflympics. Bailey is also one of the greatest swimmers of Australia in history.

Her record haul of 29 medals is also the third most by a Deaflympic athlete (among men and women) just behind Terence Parkin's haul of 33 medals and Reed Gershwind's haul of 30 medals. Her medal tally of 29, is also the highest medal count for Australia in Deaflympics history.

== Career ==
As a deaf swimmer, Bailey wasn't able to hear the starter gun despite her success at the Deaflympics.

She made her Deaflympics debut at the age of just 12 during the 1977 Summer Deaflympics where she also managed to win a bronze medal.

Bailey has also claimed national titles for Australia in the 100 m and 200 m breaststroke in 1980s, when she was just 16 years old.

She then represented the national team in the Commonwealth Games in 1982 and in 1986. She has also participated at the Pan Pacific Games. In 1982, she was ranked within the top 16 on the Speedo World Rankings list.

Bailey was awarded the Order of Australia Medal in 1985 for her services towards the sport and for her dedication despite having deafness.

Bailey has competed at the Deaflympics on 6 occasions (1977, 1981, 1985, 1989, 1993 and 1997) and finished her medal hunt with 19 gold, 5 silver and 5 bronze medals.

In 2002, she became the only woman to be inducted into the New South Wales (NSW) Hall of Champions.

At the 2005 Summer Deaflympics held in Melbourne, she was given the honour of lighting cauldron (flame bearer). In fact became the only woman to be given such an opportunity in Deaflympic history. Bailey was also a torchbearer during the 2000 Summer Olympics.

== Awards ==
- 1985: Medal of the Order of Australia (OAM)
- 1999: Sports deaf sports woman of the Year Finalist
- 2001: Medal of honour winner
