= Reed Gershwind =

American swimmer (born 1964)

Personal information
- National team: United States
- Born: May 17, 1964 (age 62) New York City, U.S.

Sport
- Sport: Swimming, water polo
Medal record
Men's swimming
Representing United States
Deaflympics
Gold medal – first place	Koln 1981	100 m freestyle
Gold medal – first place	Koln 1981	200 m freestyle
Gold medal – first place	Koln 1981	400 m individual medley
Gold medal – first place	Koln 1981	4×100 m medley relay
Gold medal – first place	Koln 1981	4×200 m freestyle relay
Gold medal – first place	Los Angeles 1985	4×100 m freestyle relay
Gold medal – first place	Los Angeles 1985	4×100 m medley relay
Gold medal – first place	Los Angeles 1985	4×200 m freestyle relay
Gold medal – first place	Christchurch 1989	4×100 m medley relay
Gold medal – first place	Sofia 1993	4×100 m freestyle relay
Gold medal – first place	Sofia 1993	4×100 m medley relay
Gold medal – first place	Sofia 1993	4×200 m freestyle relay
Men's water polo
Representing United States
Deaflympics
Gold medal – first place	Sofia 1993	water polo

Reed Gershwind (born May 17, 1964) is an American deaf former swimmer who represented the United States at the Deaflympics and in other deaf championships.

He holds the record for winning the most number of medals for United States at the Deaflympics with 30. He is ranked second among most number of medals earned by a Deaflympic athlete in history behind Terence Parkin's haul of 33.

He is the most decorated US Deaflympic athlete.

== Early life ==
Gershwind was born deaf. He attended the Lexington School for the Deaf before switching to California School for the Deaf. His parents noticed his athletic ability, eye-hand coordination and passion for winning. They encouraged him to engage in recreational sports. Gershwind showed interest in baseball and tennis and decided to target them as professional sports. At age 10 he shifted to swimming and water polo.

== Deaflympics ==
He made his debut at the Deaflympics in 1981, and was largely successful in the Games, finishing with 7 medals (including 5 golds). Gershwind continued as a successful athlete in the Deaflympics winning a total of 13 gold, 8 silver and 9 bronze medals.

Gershwind won 27 medals for swimming and 3 medals for water polo. He was a part of the US water polo team that won the gold medal in 1993.

He served as both a swimmer and a water polo player at the Deaflympics on five occasions from 1981 to 1997. He was inducted into the US Hall of Fame.

== Post-Deaflympics career ==
He works as the Swimming Technical Director for the International Committee of Sports for the Deaf. He has assisted, co-ordinated, and overseen every major international swimming Championship, including the Deaflympics. As of 2019, he serves as the Director of Budget and Finance in the Office of the Provost at Gallaudet University.
