= Saar at the Deaflympics =

Saar at the 1953 Summer Deaflympics
- Flag of the Saar protectorate
- IOC code: SAA

in Brussels, Belgium
- Competitors: 15 in 1 sport
- Medals: Gold 0 Silver 0 Bronze 0 Total 0

Summer Deaflympics appearances (overview)
- 1953

Saar Protectorate, which existed from 1947 to 1956 (German state of Saarland since), a region of Western Germany that was occupied in 1945 by France. As a separate team, Saar took part at the 1953 Summer Deaflympics before Saarland was allowed to rejoin West Germany in 1956. Fifteen competitors took part in the football event in the 1953 Summer Deaflympics in Brussels, Belgium.

== Athletes in the Summer Deaflympics ==
- 1953: Karl Altmeyer, Erwin Christmann, Heinz Finger, Christian Ganz, Herbert Heine, Alois Johann, Alfons Jung, Paul Lohrbach, Walter Meiser, Ottmar Merl, Friedrich Minn, Ewald Schmidt, Karl Schmidt, Karl Steyer, Kurt Trend (Football)

== See also ==
- Saar at the 1952 Olympics Saar at the 1952 Summer Olympics
