= 1935 Summer Deaflympics =

4th Summer Deaflympics

4th Summer Deaflympics
- Host city: London, United Kingdom
- Nations: 12 countries
- Athletes: 221 athletes
- Events: 41 (6 disciplines)
- Opening: 17 August 1935
- Closing: 24 August 1935

Summer

The 1935 Summer Deaflympics officially known as the 4th International Games for the Deaf was an international multi-sport event that was held from 17 August 1935 to 24 August 1935. It was hosted by London, England, with events held at White City Stadium. It was the only parasport event to be held in the United Kingdom until the 2012 Summer Paralympics as part of the Paralympic Games.

The tournament saw the debut of an American team.

== Participating Countries ==
The following countries participated in the 1935 Deaflympics:

- Austria
- Belgium
- Denmark
- Finland
- France
- Germany
- (United Kingdom) Great Britain
- Hungary
- Netherlands
- Norway
- Sweden
- United States of America

== Sports ==
The following events were included in the 1931 Deaflympics:

=== Individual sports ===
- Athletics
- Road cycling
- Diving
- Swimming
- Tennis

=== Team sports ===
- Football

== Medal table ==
* Host nation (Great Britain)

1935 Summer Deaflympics medal table
Rank	NOC	Gold	Silver	Bronze	Total
1	Great Britain (GBR)*	11	5	6	22
2	France (FRA)	9	3	5	17
3	Germany (GER)	6	5	5	16
4	Finland (FIN)	5	4	5	14
5	Sweden (SWE)	3	6	3	12
6	Belgium (BEL)	2	3	1	6
7	Netherlands (NED)	2	0	1	3
8	Hungary (HUN)	1	2	3	6
9	Denmark (DEN)	0	3	4	7
10	Norway (NOR)	0	2	1	3
10	United States (USA)	0	2	1	3
12	Austria (AUT)	0	1	1	2
Totals (12 entries)		39	36	36	111

== Results ==
=== Athletics ===
Event	Gold	Silver	Bronze
Men 100m	Leon Pertsowsky; France	Len Lewis; Great Britain	Wayne Otten; United States
Women 100m	Jessie Florence Say; Great Britain	Aina Kjellin; Sweden	Kathy Squires; Great Britain
Men 200m	Paul Reinmund; France	Wayne Otten; United States	Len Lewis; Great Britain
Men 400m	Kurt Milbradt; Germany	Rolf Kristian Nyberg; Norway	Louis Fruerlund; Denmark
Men 800m	Andrew C. Hall; Great Britain	Sven Pettersson; Sweden	Kurt Milbradt; Germany
Men 1500m	Robert Bouscarat; France	Cyril Henry Huckle; Great Britain	Bertil John Edvin Franklinsson; Sweden
Men 5000m	Paavo Niinikagas; Finland	Paavo Valtari; Finland	Heinz Joachim Lehmann; Germany
Men 10000m	Paavo Niinikagas; Finland	Östen Parkvall; Sweden	Matti Mölsä; Finland
Men 110m Hurdles	Valentin Kaurela; Finland	Marcel Alie; France	Veikko Lehtonen; Finland
Men 400m Hurdles	Marcel Alie; France	Erik Vilhelm Edman; Sweden	Raymond Baptiste Malatre; France
Men 4 × 100 m Relay	France (FRA); Albert Braun; Rene Le Pannetier; Leon Pertsowsky; Paul Reinmund	Sweden (SWE); Karl Gustav Astrom; Helge Crona; Osvald Dahlgren; Wilhelm Westling	Denmark (DEN); Louis Fruerlund; Hans Nissen; Gudmund Kjær Sǿrensen; Hans Erik Tvilum
Women 4x100 Relay	Great Britain (GBR); G. Bowlingbroke; Jessie Florence Say; Betty Evelyn Shrine; Kathy Squires (Note: Only Great Britain participated in this event.)		
Men 4 × 400 m Relay	France (FRA); Marcel Alie; Robert Bouscarat; Maurice Campanaud; Ange Costa	Sweden (SWE); Osvald Dahlgren; Bertil John Edvin Franklinsson; Nils Johannesson; Sven Pettersson	Denmark (DEN); Louis Fruerlund; Hans Nissen; Gudmund Kjær Sǿrensen; Hans Erik Tvilum
Men Olympic Relay	Great Britain (GBR); Andrew C. Hall; Len Lewis; Cyril Reynolds; George Scott	Finland (FIN); Börje Ahlbäck; Valentin Kaurela; Veikko Lehtonen; Paavo Palmu	Norway (NOR); Harald Bǿlstad; Hjalmar Charles Lindgaard; Rolf Kristian Nyberg; Sveinung Tinnes
Men High Jump	Veikko Lehtonen; Finland	Hans Nissen; Denmark	Hans Erik Tvilum; Denmark
Women High Jump	Hildegard Sperling; Germany	Aina Kjellin; Sweden	Grete Blankenforth; Germany
Men Pole Vault	Harvie William Vassall; Great Britain	Paavo Palmu; Finland	Valentin Kaurela; Finland
Men Long Jump	Paul Reinmund; France	John William Hayter; Great Britain	Börje Ahlbäck; Finland
Women Long Jump	Aina Kjellin; Sweden	Gussi Hahne; Germany	Grete Blankenforth; Germany
Men Shot Put	Valentin Kaurela; Finland	John Casimir Chudzikiewicz; United States	Nils Rahmn; Sweden
Women Shot Put	Aina Kjellin; Sweden	Hildegard Sperling; Germany	Martta Nieminen; Finland
Men Discus Throw	Wilhelm Westling; Sweden	Valentin Kaurela; Finland	Nils Rahmn; Sweden
Men Javelin Throw	John Casimir Chudzikiewicz; United States	Wilhelm Westling; Sweden	Valentin Kaurela; Finland

=== Cycling ===
Event	Gold	Silver	Bronze
Road Men Individual Road Race	Edwin Coburn; Great Britain	Joseph Le Saint; France	Kennington (Note: The first name of this participant is not recorded.); Great Britain

=== Diving ===
Event	Gold	Silver	Bronze
Men Diving 3m springboard	Werner Sander; Germany	Karl Kaudel; Austria	Karl Stalmach; Austria

=== Football ===
Event	Gold	Silver	Bronze
Men Football	Great Britain (GBR); John Alfred Aldred; Atkin (Note: The first name of this participant is not recorded); Donoghue (Note: The first name of this participant is not recorded); Robin Alexander Gale; Bernard Gibson; Harry Henderson; Jack Pyrah; Terence Henry Roberts; Walter Frederick Smith; Whiteman (Note: The first name of this participant is not recorded); James Young	Belgium (BEL); Robert Beernaert; Jules Bouillez; Boudewijn Bultinck; Georges De Rijcke; Gustaaf De Weweire; Louis Dehaes; Georges Deridder; Jean Hamelryckx; Alfons Hellebuyck; Gustave Leonard Rysermans; Lambert Salaets; Albert Teirlinck; Guillaume Thewissen; Pierre Van Damme; Rene Van De Weghe; Gilbert Van Wayenberg	France (FRA); Rene Bertinetti; Bernard Bourgeois; Fernand Casier; Francois Raymond Champoux; Guy Chateau; Marcel Demay; Gaston Jallut; Paul Naslin; Robert Niderost; Pierre Jean Pagny; Marceau Pealapra; Henri Perier; Felix Rieutort; Georges Thebault

=== Swimming ===
Event	Gold	Silver	Bronze
Men 100m Freestyle	Emile Talmone; France	Einar Emil Mehlum; Norway	Kurt Weiss; Germany
Women 100m Freestyle	Vilma-Rozsa Wilhelmine Krassner; Hungary	Gizella Unghvary; Hungary	M. Booth (Note: The full first name of this participant is not recorded); Great Britain
Men 400m Freestyle	Kurt Weiss; Germany	Charles Grant; Great Britain	Reidar Munthe Iversen; Norway
Men 1500m Freestyle	Kurt Weiss; Germany	Charles Grant; Great Britain	Reidar Munthe Iversen; Norway
Men 100m Backstroke	Fridtjof Mangschou Tenden; France	Wilhelm Bruno Gustav Gehring; Germany	Johannes Ringk; Netherlands
Women 100m Backstroke	Wilhelmina Dronkers-Jansen; Netherlands	Vilma-Rozsa Wilhelmine Krassner; Hungary	Gizella Unghvary; Hungary
Men 200m Breaststroke	Horst Joachim Hoffmann; Germany	Jens Ludvig Petersen; Denmark	John Stuart Burge; Great Britain
Women 200m Breaststroke	Annie Chatarina Neleman; Netherlands	Anna Gerber; Germany	Gizella Unghvary; Hungary
Men 4 × 100 m freestyle relay	Germany (GER); Wilhelm Bruno Gustav Gehring; Erich Hengstmann; Horst Joachim Hoffmann; Kurt Weiss (Note: Germany was the only country who participated in this event)		
Men 3x100m freestyle medley	Germany (GER); Wilhelm Bruno Gustav Gehring; Horst Joachim Hoffmann; Kurt Weiss	Norway (NOR); Reidar Munthe Iversen; Einar Emil Mehlum; Fridtjof Mangschou Tenden (Note: Germany and Norway were the only countries who participated in this event)	

=== Tennis ===
Event	Gold	Silver	Bronze
Men Tennis Singles	William Arthur Smith; Great Britain	Max Shrine; Great Britain	Michel Crouan; France
Women Tennis Singles	Antonine Maere; Belgium	Germaine Hamy-Maere; Belgium	Marjorie Janet Durlacher; Great Britain
Men Tennis Doubles	Great Britain (GBR); Douglas Fry; William Arthur Smith	France (FRA); Andre Petry; Pierre Rincheval	Belgium (BEL); Antoine Dresse; Raymond van Hoecke
Women Tennis Doubles	Belgium (BEL); Germaine Hamy-Maere; Antonine Maere	Great Britain (GBR); Lenore Dawson; Marjorie Janet Durlacher	France (FRA); Charlotte Helene Dacla; Helene Haardt
Mixed Tennis Doubles	Great Britain (GBR); Marjorie Janet Durlacher; William Arthur Smith	Belgium (BEL); Antoine Dresse; Antonine Maere	France (FRA); Michel Crouan; Charlotte Helene Dacla

== Notes ==
Preceded by 1931 III; Nürnberg, Germany	1935 Summer Deaflympics; 1935; IV; London, Great Britain	Succeeded by 1939 V Stockholm, Sweden
