= Signature (charity) =

UK charity for deaf communication qualifications

Signature is a United Kingdom national charity and awarding body for deaf communication qualifications. Signature attempts to improve communication between deaf, deafblind and hearing people, whilst creating better communities.

Since the charity was formed in 1982, more than 420,000 people have taken a Signature qualification. All Signature qualifications are nationally recognised and accredited by Ofqual (The Office of the Qualifications and Examinations Regulator). They are the largest awarding body in the UK for deaf and deafblind qualifications. British Sign Language (BSL), Irish Sign Language (ISL), Speech to text reporting and Communicating with Deafblind people are some of the available qualifications.

== History ==
The charity grew from a Communication Skills Project. The Council for the Advancement of Communication with Deaf People (CACDP) was established in 1982 to increase the number of people gaining skills in Sign Language and Sign Language Interpreting. CACDP set up the first register of communication professionals in 1982. At first, only BSL/English interpreters were able to register but this was later expanded to include speech to text reporters, lipspeakers, notetakers and deafblind interpreters.

In 2009, CACDP rebranded to Signature.

Signature Hall of Fame

To celebrate forty years of the charity in 2022, Signature inducted ten prominent figures in the deaf world into their 'Hall of Fame'. The inductees were: David Buxton, Clark Denmark, Charlie Swinbourne, Deaf Village North West, Performance Interpreting, Leeds City Council Deaf (DAHIT), Ahmed Mudawi, City Lit, Lipspeaker UK and Lesley Weatherson, Chief Inspector Emma Gilbert.
