= 1939 Summer Deaflympics =

5th Summer Deaflympics

5th Summer Deaflympics
- Host city: Stockholm, Sweden
- Nations: 13 countries
- Athletes: 250 athletes
- Events: 44 (7 disciplines)
- Opening: 24 August 1939
- Closing: 27 August 1939

Summer

Winter

The 1939 Summer Deaflympics (Swedish: 1939 Sommardeaflympics) officially known as 5th International Silent Games (Swedish: 5: e Internationella Tysta Spelen), was an international multi-sport event that was held from 24 to 27 August 1939 in Stockholm, Sweden.

== Participating Countries ==
The following countries participated in the 1939 Deaflympics:

- Belgium
- Denmark
- Estonia
- Finland
- France
- Germany
- (United Kingdom) Great Britain
- Latvia
- Norway
- Poland
- Romania
- Sweden
- United States of America

== Sports ==
The following events were included in the 1939 Deaflympics:

=== Individual sports ===
- Athletics
- Road cycling
- Diving
- Shooting
- Swimming
- Tennis

=== Team sports ===
- Football

== Medal table ==
* Host nation (Sweden)

1939 Summer Deaflympics medal table
Rank	NOC	Gold	Silver	Bronze	Total
1	Germany (GER)	16	11	9	36
2	Sweden (SWE)*	13	11	9	33
3	Finland (FIN)	5	5	4	14
4	Great Britain (GBR)	4	4	3	11
5	France (FRA)	3	10	7	20
6	Belgium (BEL)	2	1	3	6
7	Norway (NOR)	1	1	3	5
8	United States (USA)	0	1	0	1
9	Poland (POL)	0	0	3	3
10	Denmark (DEN)	0	0	2	2
11	Estonia (EST)	0	0	0	0
11	Latvia (LAT)	0	0	0	0
11	Romania (ROM)	0	0	0	0
Totals (13 entries)		44	44	43	131

== Results ==
=== Athletics ===
Event	Gold	Silver	Bronze
Men 100m	Karl Gustav Astrom; Sweden	Tage Bernhard Engberg; Sweden	Lucien Chevrot; France
Women 100m	Lisa Nagel; Germany	Svea Sandström; Sweden	Jessie Florence Say; Great Britain
Men 200m	Karl Gustav Astrom; Sweden	Tage Bernhard Engberg; Sweden	Lucien Chevrot; France
Men 400m	Bertil Karl Baath; Sweden	Maurice Campanaud; France	Sven Pettersson; Sweden
Men 800m	Bertil Karl Baath; Sweden	Andrew C. Hall; Great Britain	Sven Pettersson; Sweden
Men 1500m	Maurice Herson; France	Bertil John Edvin Franklinsson; Sweden	Gunther Woller; Germany
Men 5000m	Paavo Niinikagas; Finland	Sture Erlandsson; Sweden	Paavo Valtari; Finland
Men 10000m	Sture Erlandsson; Sweden	Paavo Niinikagas; Finland	Marcel Louis Gosseau; France
Men 110m Hurdles	Georg Thulke; Germany	Marcel Alie; France	Bogdan Gniot; Poland
Men 400m Hurdles	Georg Thulke; Germany	Marcel Alie; France	Miron Lucyk; Sweden
Men 4 × 100 m Relay	Sweden (SWE); Hans Andersson; Karl Gustav Astrom; Tage Bernhard Engberg; Sven Röden	France (FRA); Roger Laurent Metairie; Leon Pertsowsky; Paul Reinmund	Germany (GER); Gustav Butefisch; Hans Herrmann; Fritz Nagel; Johann Rademacher
Women 4x100 Relay	Germany (GER); Ursula Briesemeister; Gussi Hahne; Lisa Nagel; Hildegard Sperling	Sweden (SWE); Aina Kjellin; Svea Sandström (Note: Only two participants were recorded as competing in this even)	Poland (POL); Rachela Frochtmanowna; Monika Kminowna; Helena Krolakowna; Krystyna Lewinska
Men 4 × 400 m Relay	Sweden (SWE); Bertil Karl Baath; Osvald Dahlgren; Karl Erik Kull; Sven Pettersson	Germany (GER); Eric Jachtmann; Fritz Nagel; Walter Thiel; Georg Thulke	France (FRA); Maurice Campanaud; Robert Mathe (Note: Only two participants are recorded as competitors in this team)
Men Olympic Relay	Sweden (SWE); Karl Gustav Astrom; Bertil Karl Baath; Tage Bernhard Engberg; Sven Pettersson	France (FRA); Maurice Campanaud; Robert Mathe (Note: Only two participants are recorded as competitors in this team)	Germany (GER); Gustav Butefisch; Hans Herrmann; Eric Jachtmann; Georg Thulke
Men High Jump	Wilhelm Westling; Sweden	Mauri Karp; Finland	Siegfried Illmer; Germany
Women High Jump	Lisa Nagel; Germany	Hildegard Sperling; Germany	Krystyna Lewinska; Poland
Men Pole Vault	Erik Vilhelm Edman; Sweden	Harvie William Vassall; Great Britain	Arvid Rǿstad; Norway
Men Long Jump	Karl Gustav Astrom; Sweden	Paul Reinmund; France	Tage Bernhard Engberg; Sweden
Women Long Jump	Svea Sandström; Sweden	Lisa Nagel; Germany	Gussi Hahne; Germany
Men Shot Put	Valentin Kaurela; Finland	Karl Gustav Astrom; Sweden	Nils Erik Berggren; Sweden
Women Shot Put	Hildegard Sperling; Germany	Aina Kjellin; Sweden	Martta Nieminen; Finland
Men Discus Throw	Wilhelm Westling; Sweden	Evert Aukusti Viitala; Finland	Nils Erik Berggren; Sweden
Men Javelin Throw	Eero Edvard Ojala; Finland	Valentin Kaurela; Finland	Evert Aukusti Viitala; Finland

=== Cycling ===
Event	Gold	Silver	Bronze
Road Men Individual Road Race	Marcel Leterme; France	Polydore Cours; Belgium	Holger Forsblom; Finland

=== Diving ===
Event	Gold	Silver	Bronze
Men Diving 3m springboard	Karl Kaudel; Germany	George Crichton (Note: Only Germany and the USA participated in this event.); United States	

=== Football ===
Event	Gold	Silver	Bronze
Men Football	Great Britain (GBR); John Alfred Aldred; Albert Cole; Arthur Fountain; Robin Alexander Gale; Bernard Gibson; Sydney Wenlock Large; Lawrence McManus; Alfred James Morton; Charles Ogden; Jack Pyrah; Terence Henry Roberts; Herbert Stanley Smith; Walter Frederick Smith	Sweden (SWE); Sven Andersson; Josef Axelsson; Ake Bredstrom; Gustaf Claesson; Gottfrid Edlund; Nils Elion; Herbert Eriksson; Ragnar Fogelstrom; Sven Hansson; Arne Johansson; Gustav Johansson; Rune Johansson; Holger Karlsson; Nils Larsson; Gunnar Lindell; Karl Axel Pettersson; Henry Svensson	Belgium (BEL); Jules Bouillez; Albert Coppens; Robert Joseph Coppens; Nicolas Francois; Louis Albert Govaert; Jean Hamelryckx; Alfons Hellebuyck; Gustave Leonard Rysermans; Robert Schliwa; Albert Teirlinck; Pierre Van Damme; Fernand Van Der Geyten; Gilbert Van Wayenberg; Edward Jacob Verheezen

=== Shooting ===
Event	Gold	Silver	Bronze
Men shooting 300m standard rifle 3 positions (3x20 shots)	Torsten Forstèn; Finland	Bruno Mouton; Finland	Fritz Klemm; Germany
Men Shooting team classification	Finland (FIN); Torsten Forstèn; Lauri Mikkola; Bruno Mouton	Sweden (SWE); Ivar Ernst Larsson; Anders Ohlsson; Arne Valfrid Snitth (Note: Finland and Sweden were the only teams who participated in this event)	

=== Swimming ===
Event	Gold	Silver	Bronze
Men 100m Freestyle	Emile Talmone; France	Herbert Emil Reuschke; Germany	Fridtjof Mangschou Tenden; Norway
Women 100m Freestyle	Hedwig Thamm; Germany	Adele Hannemann; Germany	Katharine Enid Allen; Great Britain
Women 200m Freestyle	Hedwig Thamm; Germany	Adele Hannemann; Germany	Ulla Marie Schultz; Denmark
Men 400m Freestyle	Joachim Peters; Germany	Kurt Weiss; Germany	Jens Ludvig Petersen; Denmark
Men 1500m Freestyle	Kurt Weiss; Germany	Heinz Herkt; Germany	William Sidney Hempstead; Great Britain
Men 100m Backstroke	Wilhelm Bruno Gustav Gehring; Germany	Fridtjof Mangschou Tenden; France	Kurt Güldner; Germany
Women 100m Backstroke	Adele Hannemann; Germany	Maria Otto; Germany	Hedwig Thamm; Germany
Men 200m Breaststroke	Heinz Matthews; Germany	Heinz Herkt; Germany	Erich Hermann Karl Salzmann; Germany
Women 200m Breaststroke	Anna Gerber; Germany	Maria Otto; Germany	Ruth Munthe Iversen; Norway
Men 4 × 100 m freestyle relay	Norway (NOR); Thore Aksel Eek; Reidar Munthe Iversen; Einar Emil Mehlum; Fridtjof Mangschou Tenden (Note: Norway was the only country who participated in this event)		
Men 3x100m freestyle medley	Germany (GER); Wilhelm Bruno Gustav Gehring; Heinz Matthews; Herbert Emil Reuschke	Norway (NOR); Reidar Munthe Iversen; Einar Emil Mehlum; Fridtjof Mangschou Tenden	Sweden (SWE); Stig Hasselrot; John Hill; Rune Birger Pernow

=== Tennis ===
Event	Gold	Silver	Bronze
Men Tennis Singles	William Arthur Smith; Great Britain	Michel Crouan; France	Andre Petry; France
Women Tennis Singles	Antonine Maere; Belgium	Erna Elvira Frederiksen; Great Britain	Germaine Hamy-Maere; Belgium
Men Tennis Doubles	Great Britain (GBR); Max Shrine; William Arthur Smith	France (FRA); Michel Crouan; Andre Petry	France (FRA); Charles Boisselot; Pierre Rincheval
Women Tennis Doubles	Belgium (BEL); Germaine Hamy-Maere; Antonine Maere	Great Britain (GBR); Joan Vernon Connew; Lilian Irene East	France (FRA); Charlotte Helene Dacla; Eliane Boisselot
Mixed Tennis Doubles	Great Britain (GBR); Lilian Irene East; William Arthur Smith	France (FRA); Charlotte Helene Dacla; Andre Petry	Belgium (BEL); Joan Vernon Connew; Max Shrine

== Notes ==
Preceded by 1935 IV; London, Great Britain	1939; V Stockholm, Sweden	Succeeded by 1949 VI; Copenhagen, Denmark
