= John M. Lovett =

John M. Lovett AM

6th president of Comite International des Sports des Sourds
- In office 13 March 1995 – 30 October 2003

Personal details
- Born: 10 July 1943 Melbourne, Australia
- Died: 30 October 2003 (aged 60) Melbourne, Australia
- Spouse: Jill Diana Lovett
- Children: 2

John Michael Lovett AM (10 July 1943 – 30 October 2003) was a former Australian government administrator who made the breakthrough in the development of deaf sports in Australia. He was also the former President of the International Committee of Sports for the Deaf, served as the 7th president from 1995 to 2003 until his death.

John Lovett was appointed a Member of the Order of Australia (AM) by the Australian government in the 1986 Australia Day Honours, "for service to those with impaired hearing." He was married to a former British Deaflympic swimmer, Jill Diana Lovett.

== Death ==
Lovett died in an hospital in Melbourne, Australia on 30 October due to blood cancer. He served as the President of the ICSD prior to his death.

== Awards and honours ==
- Membership of the Order of Australia (AM)
- Edward Miner Gallaudet Award at the Gallaudet University
- CISS medal of honour - gold in 1993
- CISS medal of honour - silver in 1985
