= Eugène Rubens-Alcais =

French deaf activist (1884–1963)

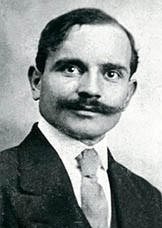

1st President of Comite International des Sports des Sourds
- In office 1924–1953

Personal details
- Born: 7 May 1884 Saint-Jean-du-Gard, France
- Died: 8 March 1963 (aged 78) Ivry-sur-Seine, France
- Resting place: Ivry Cemetery, Ivry-sur-Seine
- Nickname(s): Baron de Coubertin deaf-mute, deaf version of Baron de Coubertin, the deaf Baron de Coubertin

Eugène Rubens-Alcais (7 May 1884 – 8 March 1963) was a French deaf activist in the field of sports. He is known for introducing the Deaflympics in 1924 for deaf sportspeople. He was determined to establish international competitions for the deaf, as they were considered as intellectually disabled people during his lifetime. Alcais believed that deaf athletes should have their own independent international competitions and promoted the idea in his own deaf sports magazine called The Silent Sportsman. In 1924, he was instrumental in hosting the inaugural Summer Deaflympics in his home country, France. Alcais is also the founder of Comité International des Sports des Sourds (now called the International Committee of Sports for the Deaf), the world governing body of deaf sports. He is often called the "father of Deaflympics" or "father of Olympics for the deaf".

== Biography ==
Alcais was born on 7 May 1884 to a poor family in Saint-Jean-du-Gard, France. He was an auto mechanic by profession and a competitive cyclist.

== Contributions to promote deaf sports ==
Eugène Rubens-Alcais is considered a pioneer of the deaf sports movement along with Antoine Dresse of Belgium. He was successful in hosting a multi-sport event for people who have hearing problems, known as the International Games for the Deaf or International Silent Games (now renamed the Deaflympics) in 1924. He himself as a deaf person realised that deaf people were discriminated against and were not allowed to compete in the Olympics, so he wanted to introduce a similar multi-sporting event. He was popular among the deaf community because of his initiatives to conduct competitions like Deaflympics for the goodwill of deaf participants.

Alcais founded the Comité International des Sports des Sourds (CISS) jointly with Antoine in 1918 and served as its first President from 1924 to 1953. He also founded the Paris Sports Club for Deaf Mutes, which is now referred to as the Comité de Coordination des Sportifs Sourds de France (French Deaf Sports Federation), to improve the level of deaf sport in France. It is also the national governing body of France for deaf sports and to send deaf competitors to represent France at the Deaflympics.

Owing to his significant contributions to the deaf community, he has been described as the deaf equivalent of Baron Pierre de Coubertin, the founder of the modern Olympic Games.

In order to respect him, the ICSD introduced Rubens-Alcais award which has been awarded for the development and improvement of deaf sports in various countries.

== Awards ==
- Gold medal of honour of Deaflympics (1949)
- Honorary Life Member of ICDS since 1953
