= Comité International des Sports des Sourds =

Global governing body of sports for the deaf

International Committee of Sports for the Deaf
- Comité International des Sports des Sourds Inc
- Formation: August 10, 1924; 101 years ago
- VAT ID no.: CHE-376.811.133
- Legal status: association registered in the Commercial Register of the Canton of Vaud per art. 60 ff. of the Swiss Civil Code
- Headquarters: Lausanne, Switzerland
- President: Ádám Kósa
- Website: deaflympics.com

The International Committee of Sports for the Deaf is the apex body organizing international sports events for the deaf, particularly the Deaflympics (previously called World Games for the Deaf). It is also called the Comité International des Sports des Sourds (CISS). The organization was founded in Paris by Eugène Rubens-Alcais, who organized the first "International Silent Games" in 1924. Alcais was himself deaf and was the president of the French Deaf Sports Federation.

CISS, now also called ICSD, is headquartered in Lausanne, Switzerland.

== History ==
The early pioneers of the international deaf sports movement were Eugène Rubens-Alcais (France) and Antoine Dresse (Belgium).

The first Summer Games were held in Paris in 1924, and started with 148 athletes from nine countries (France, Belgium, Great Britain, Holland, Hungary, Italy, Poland, Romania and Czechoslovakia). The first Winter Games were instituted in 1949 at Seefeld, Austria. They attracted 33 athletes from five countries.

In 1935, Japan joined CISS as the first Asian member and the United States as the first North American member. Australia and New Zealand joined later in 1955 as the first members from Oceania. The first African member was South Africa, in 1975.

After the 2022 Russian invasion of Ukraine, the CISS banned athletes from Russia and Belarus from that year's Deaflympics in Caxias do Sul, Brazil.

== Events ==
=== Deaflympics ===
The Deaflympics (previously called World Games for the Deaf, and International Games for the Deaf) are an International Olympic Committee (IOC)-sanctioned event at which deaf athletes compete at an elite level.

=== World championships ===
- World Deaf Badminton Championships
- World Deaf Football Championships
- World Deaf Volleyball Championships

== Presidents ==
- 1924-1953: France Eugène Rubens-Alcais
- 1953-1955: Sweden Oscar Ryden
- 1955-1961: Denmark Jens Peter Nielsen
- 1961-1971: France Pierre Bernhard
- 1971-1995: United States Jerald M. Jordan
- 1995-2003: Australia John M. Lovett
- 2003-2009: United States Donalda Ammons Kay
- 2009-2013: United Kingdom Craig A. Crowley
- 2013-2018: Russia Valery Nikititch Rukhledev
- 2019-2020: Chinese Taipei Kang Chen
- 2021-2022: Brazil Gustavo de Araújo Perazzolo
- 2022-present: Hungary Ádám Kósa

== See also ==
- Deaf people in sports
- International Olympic Committee
- International Paralympic Committee
- Special Olympics
