= Windows SideShow =

Former feature by Microsoft

- Windows SideShow running on a simulator, from top left to bottom middle: "Touch", "Landscape", and "Portrait" style.
- Developer: Microsoft
- Release: January 30, 2007; 19 years ago
- Operating system: Windows Vista, Windows 7, Windows 8
- Type: Auxiliary display platform
- Website: (From the archive) web.archive.org/web/20070203010745/http://www.microsoft.com/windows/products/windowsvista/features/details/sideshow.mspx

Windows SideShow (codenamed Auxiliary Display) was a feature by Microsoft introduced in Windows Vista to supply information such as e-mail, instant messages, and RSS feeds from a personal computer to a local or remote peripheral device or display. SideShow was intended to enhance the Windows experience by enabling new mobility scenarios for the Windows platform and by providing power saving benefits as part of Microsoft's broader efforts regarding a mobile initiative.

SideShow was unveiled in 2003 as a feature of Windows Vista ("Longhorn") to provide peripheral awareness of information. Preliminary documentation from Microsoft focused on using it to provide online information in an internal display of a mobile device such as a laptop while supporting desktop computer scenarios; information could also be cached for later use when offline or when in sleep mode. Microsoft planned to include a Control Panel applet and configurable battery, calendar, email, wireless network, and Windows Media Player modules for SideShow.

SideShow was included with the release of Windows Vista in 2006, which included modules for Windows Mail and Windows Media Player, and would ultimately encompass other aspects of the Windows platform and Microsoft ecosystem. Microsoft Office supported SideShow with the release of Microsoft Office 2007. Microsoft introduced SideShow support for Windows CE, Windows Mobile 5.0, and Windows Mobile 6.0 in 2008 and released modules for applications such as Microsoft Office 2003, Microsoft PowerPoint, Windows Media Center, and Windows Sidebar. SideShow was supported with the release of Windows 7 in 2009. With the release of Windows 8.1 in 2013, SideShow was discontinued.

== History ==
=== Windows Vista ===
Auxiliary displays were listed by Microsoft among other forms of information indicators for personal computers during the Windows Hardware Engineering Conference of 2003. An auxiliary display feature was later presented by Microsoft during the WinHEC 2004 where it was scheduled to be included in Windows Vista, then known by its codename, "Longhorn." It was intended for tablet PCs and other mobile devices to provide users with up-to-date information at a glance and to increase the value of the Windows operating system in new mobile scenarios. Auxiliary display support was included among other mobile features scheduled for the operating system, including Windows Mobility Center, speech recognition, and Windows HotStart, and was listed as part of Microsoft's mobile PC strategy. A prototype auxiliary display device was demonstrated by Intel at the Intel Developer Forum conference in fall of 2004.

In February 2005, Microsoft announced that the first beta version of Windows Vista, then codenamed "Longhorn," would include support for the feature; a preliminary software development kit would also be released concurrently with the operating system. At WinHEC 2005, Microsoft released details about the SideShow development platform and discussed new scenarios enabled by the technology. Prototypes were also produced by several original equipment manufacturers (OEMs) and displayed at the conference. Microsoft would release details a year later at WinHEC 2006 where additional hardware was also displayed.

Windows Vista was released to manufacturing on November 8, 2006 and includes two SideShow gadgets, one for Windows Mail and one for Windows Media Player. Microsoft Office 2007, released to manufacturing on the same day as Windows Vista, included an Outlook 2007 calendar gadget for SideShow.

=== Windows 7 ===
With Windows 7 Microsoft introduced multiple user support for gadgets, improved the reliability and resiliency of SideShow APIs for gadgets on multiple devices, improved asynchronous processing throughput, and updated the SideShow control panel experience with changes such as a more prominent link to settings and the introduction of tooltip descriptions for gadgets.

== Overview ==
A mail opened on Windows Sideshow, using the Windows Mail gadget in Windows Vista

Windows SideShow displays can be embedded as part of a device itself or as a separate component. Examples include an electronic visual display integrated as part of a keyboard, or digital photo frames that can receive information Wirelessly; wireless devices are connected to a personal computer through wireless network technologies, including Bluetooth and Wi-Fi; manufacturers may also produce detachable displays. Sideshow devices display various types of information, such as contacts, calendar appointments, e-mail, maps, RSS feeds, and can serve as indicators for system information such as battery life and wireless network strength. Microsoft has published documentation which suggests additional uses for SideShow devices, such as the ability to transmit information and notifications received from a computer across televisions and set-top boxes, and the ability to serve as a second screen for PC games and their content (e.g., character statistics or maps) and to enable new multitasking scenarios during gameplay.

SideShow features integration with the Windows desktop gadget feature of Windows Vista and Windows 7, which enables a single gadget to operate simultaneously on a user's desktop while supplying data across devices.

SideShow uses the Windows Portable Devices infrastructure to communicate with devices; when viewed as a portable device in File Explorer, users can also adjust and interact with the files included as part of auxiliary displays. Auxiliary displays appear in Device Manager and integrate with Windows Vista's Function Discovery technology.

== Development platform ==
A gadget developed for SideShow is written by programming for the Windows SideShow Platform application programming interface—a native code COM-based API introduced in Windows Vista. A managed API for .NET Framework developers was also released by Microsoft, and includes development templates for Visual Studio 2005 and Visual Studio 2008. To aid in the development of gadgets, Microsoft released a SideShow simulator that emulates the functionality of a SideShow-compatible device, thereby allowing developers to test the appearance and functionality of gadgets without requiring physical hardware.

Devices for Windows SideShow have different hardware traits than devices such as mobile phones or PDAs. The former have their own processor; they need not rely solely on a connection to a computer for processing tasks. There are online and offline abilities that allow the device to run larger components on the connected computer. The following list contains typical device display types and technologies.

Auxiliary display types
Device type	Description
Enhanced display	Renders full color content including text and images, e.g. a device running Microsoft's rendering code for the .NET Micro Framework.
Single line display	Can show one or two lines of text, but supports no images.
Attached display, lid top	Located on the body of a PC (notebook, desktop, or server), e.g. on the top of a laptop's lid, or a media center's front panel.
Remote display	Located off of the PC, and talks to the PC through a wired or wireless network protocol.

Hardware-specific, native applications that provide rich-media experiences like audio and video playback that can be accessed through the SideShow user interface require the SDK from the specific platform vendor. For example, Nvidia provides the Preface platform that includes abilities like MP3, AAC, MPEG-4 encode-decode and other digital media formats.

== Market acceptance ==
Few OEMs accepted SideShow.

In 2007, Asus announced the W5Fe, a laptop with a full-color, 2.8-inch SideShow display on the front cover.

In 2006, after being featured at WinHEC, the 7-inch and 10-inch "Momento" digital photo frames were released by their developer, A Living Picture, and provided Sideshow functionality over WiFi. They were subsequently marketed by i-mate along with its Momento Live picture service, before being shut down in 2009.

In October 2007, Dell released the XPS 420, which included a Sideshow device on the top front of the machine. It was not widely promoted, found little use and was quietly dropped when the XPS 430 came out a year later.

Intoware (formerly Ikanos Consulting) provided AccuWeather, Facebook, Flickr, iTunes, Twitter, and Windows Live Messenger.

On February 1, 2010, Ikanos Consulting announced Threemote, a suite of Windows SideShow-compatible products for embedded platforms including Windows Mobile, Google Android, and Kopin Golden-i. Threemote appears unsupported and had been unavailable from the Android Market for some time as of September 2011, nor was it available for Windows Mobile. In a blog posting in April 2010, the technical director of Ikanos consulting said that Sideshow was not dead and Threemote was "bubbling along".

On February 7, 2012, Chris James released "MS Sideshow Device", an implementation of a Windows Sideshow device for Android.

Microsoft discontinued the Sideshow gallery. A duplication of the sideshow gallery content is available at Windows Sidebar Gadget Gallery.

With the introduction of Windows 8.1, Microsoft discontinued the technology and removed support for SideShow devices from the operating system.

== See also ==
- Smart Personal Objects Technology
