= Windows DVD Maker =

Discontinued DVD authoring program

- Screenshot of the Windows DVD Maker start page
- Developer: Microsoft
- Release: November 30, 2006; 19 years ago
- Final release: August 15, 2016; 10 years ago (v16.4.3528.0331) / September 21, 2020; 5 years ago
- Included with: Windows Vista and Windows 7
- Type: DVD authoring
- Website: www.microsoft.com/windows/products/windowsvista/features/details/dvdmaker.mspx

Windows DVD Maker is a discontinued DVD authoring application developed by Microsoft introduced in Windows Vista, available in the Home Premium and Ultimate editions of Windows Vista for users to create slideshows and videos for playback on media devices including DVD players and the Xbox 360 home video game console. It is also available in the Home Premium, Professional, Enterprise, and Ultimate editions of Windows 7, but it is no longer available as of the release of Windows 8.

DVD Maker was officially discontinued by Microsoft on July 26, 2022, and it was replaced by Video Editor (formerly Microsoft Story Remix) which was built in with Microsoft Photos on Windows 10.

DVD Maker features an Aero Wizard-style user interface and includes customizable effects and transitions for slide shows and videos, which are Direct3D hardware accelerated and require the Windows Display Driver Model. Developers can create new effects, styles, and transitions through a software development kit, which include options for project user interface personalization. DVD Maker includes a number of command line options and integrates with other applications in Windows Vista including Windows Media Center, Windows Media Player, Windows Movie Maker, and Windows Photo Gallery. DVD Maker—as well as Windows Media Center and Windows Media Player—can be removed from Windows 7, where Windows Movie Maker is also no longer available in favor of Windows Essentials.

== History ==
DVD Maker was reported by Paul Thurrott during the WinHEC 2003, who said Windows Vista (codenamed "Longhorn") would support DVD movie creation "through an independent application, and not through the shell." This detail was accompanied by reports that Windows Vista would also support all major DVD packet writing formats such as Mount Rainier, and would eliminate the "staging and burning" steps while writing to optical media—files copied to optical media could instead be written immediately, or managed later—making DVDs equivalent to flash storage. The Live File System enables this latter feature.

DVD Maker is available in Windows 7 as an optional application installed by default; it is no longer available as of the release of Windows 8.

=== 2016.5 ===
With the discontinuation of the Windows Live brand (and the re-branding of the Windows Live suite as Windows Essentials), Windows DVD Maker 2016 was released in August 2016. Support for recording voice-overs was restored, along with an audio mixer and integration with several free stock music services. H.264/MP4 became the default export format (replacing Windows Media Video, but still can be used), support for uploading to Vimeo was introduced (other sites were added to the list in the Windows 8.1 release of the suite), and hardware accelerated video pila stabilisation was also added as an exclusive feature for Windows 8 users.

=== Discontinuation and replacements ===
DVD Maker was officially removed for download on July 26, 2022. Like Windows Photo Gallery from Windows Essentials, Movie Maker was replaced by the Video Editor built into the Microsoft Photos App included in Windows 11.

On May 10, 2023, Microsoft acquired Clipchamp, a web-based video editing app for an undisclosed amount, and integrated it as part of Windows 11 on January 25, 2024. This newly acquired video editing app reintroduces the timeline editing layout that had been previously removed in Windows Live Movie Maker, along with additional features including a text-to-speech generator powered by Microsoft Azure, and Microsoft OneDrive integration.

The 2026 update for Windows 11 removed Video Editor from the Photos app, replacing it with Clipchamp

== Features ==
Windows DVD Maker is available on Home Premium, Enterprise and Ultimate editions of Windows Vista, as well as Home Premium, Professional, Enterprise and Ultimate editions of Windows 7. It has a simple user interface, which takes the user through the process of creating DVD-Video. The first step involves importing video files, arranging them to play in proper order. Windows DVD Maker automatically splits the videos into scenes that can be accessed from a special scene selection page in the DVD menu. In the next step, animated DVD menus can be added to the compilation. Windows DVD Maker can also add a slide show of pictures with a musical accompaniment and transition effects. Many of these are similar to the transition effects available in Windows Movie Maker. Users can also customize the font and button styles. The application can show an interactive preview of what the DVD will look and act like when it has been burned. For example, users can navigate the DVD menus, testing them.

Windows DVD Maker is designed to encode video as background process with reduced scheduling priority to ensure the computer remains responsive during the compilation process.

== See also ==
- Features new to Windows Vista
- List of features removed in Windows 8
- List of DVD authoring applications
