= Smart Personal Objects Technology =

Discontinued intelligent technology standard

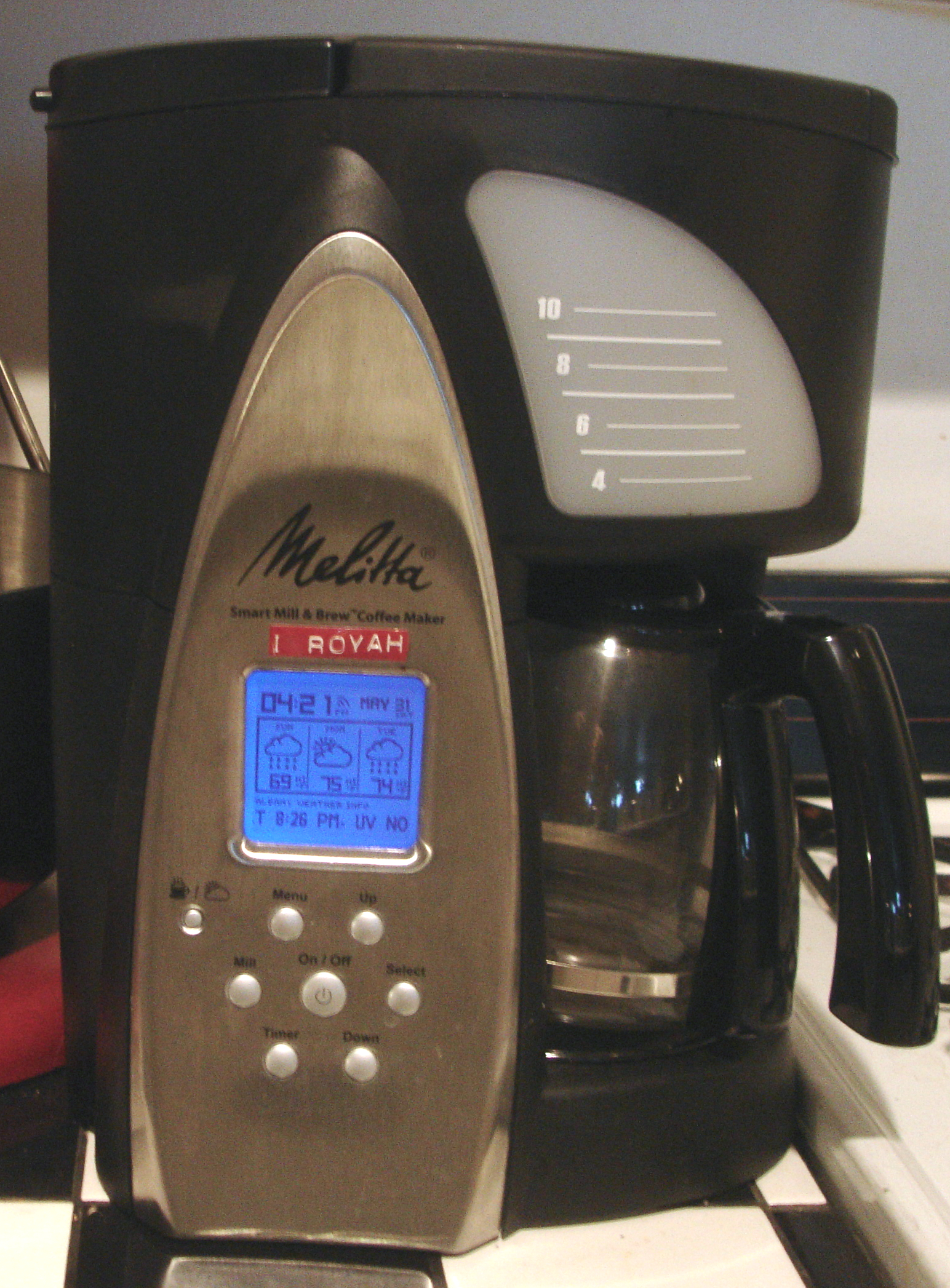
A Melitta drip coffeemaker displaying a weather forecast on an electronic visual display powered by SPOT

The Smart Personal Objects Technology (SPOT) is a discontinued initiative by Microsoft to create intelligent and personal home appliances, consumer electronics, and other objects through new hardware capabilities and software features.

Development of SPOT began as an incubation project initiated by the Microsoft Research division. SPOT was first announced by Bill Gates at the COMDEX computer exposition event in 2002, and additional details were revealed by Microsoft at the 2003 Consumer Electronics Show where Gates demonstrated a set of prototype smartwatches—the first type of device that would support the technology. Unlike more recent technologies, SPOT did not use more traditional forms of connectivity, such as 3G or Wi-Fi, but relied on FM broadcasting subcarrier transmission as a method of data distribution.

While several types of electronics would eventually support the technology throughout its lifecycle, SPOT was considered a commercial failure. Reasons that have been cited for its failure include its subscription-based business model, support limited to North America, the emergence of more efficient and popular forms of data distribution, and mobile feature availability that surpasses the features that SPOT offered.

== History ==
=== Development ===
Development of SPOT began as an incubation project led by Microsoft engineer, Bill Mitchell, and initiated by the Microsoft Research division. Mitchell would enlist the help of Larry Karr, president of SCA Data Systems, to develop the project. Karr had previously worked in the 1980s to develop technology for Atari that would distribute games in a manner distinct from the company's competitors; Karr proposed FM broadcasting subcarrier transmission as a method of distribution, technology which would also be used by Microsoft's SPOT. Microsoft Research and SCA Data Systems would ultimately develop the DirectBand subcarrier technology for SPOT. National Semiconductor would aid in the development of device chipsets, which would feature an ARM7 CPU and ROM, SRAM, and a 100 MHz RF receiver chip.

SPOT was unveiled by Bill Gates at the annual COMDEX computer exposition event in fall of 2002. Gates stated that "new devices and technologies will help bring about the next computing revolution" and demonstrated refrigerator magnets that displayed the current time and sports scores, and an alarm clock that could display a list of upcoming appointments, traffic updates, and weather forecasts.

Microsoft's "XEEL" remote concept aimed to provide a consistent navigation experience across various device types including SPOT devices.

At the Consumer Electronics Show of 2003, Microsoft announced that wristwatches would be the first type of device to utilize the technology in a partnership with watch manufacturers Citizen Watch Co., Fossil, and Suunto. Bill Gates also demonstrated a set of prototype smart watches. SPOT was not Microsoft's first foray into the smartwatch business—the company previously co-developed the Timex Datalink with Timex in 1994. During CES, Microsoft claimed that the first SPOT-based smartwatches would be released in the fall of that year; the company would also release a promotional video that displayed an estimated delivery time of fall 2003, but the first devices would be delayed until the beginning of 2004.

At the Windows Hardware Engineering Conference of 2003, Gates unveiled a new set of hardware-based navigational controls codenamed XEEL, designed to create a consistent navigation experience across Windows-based devices, such as smart phones, tablet PCs, and those powered by SPOT. Microsoft intended for XEEL to create a consistent navigation experience across hardware devices that equaled the software interface navigation consistency introduced by the mouse scroll wheel.

In June 2003, Microsoft unveiled its MSN Direct wireless service developed specifically for SPOT, which would be made available across North America. The company stated that the service would enable the delivery of personalized information on devices and, as an example of this functionality, would allow users to receive messages sent from MSN Messenger or calendar appointment reminders from Microsoft Outlook. MSN Direct would use a subscription-based business model, available through monthly or yearly service plans. MSN Direct relied on the DirectBand subcarrier technology developed by Microsoft in conjunction with SCA Data Systems.

=== Release ===
The first devices to make use of SPOT were released in 2004 by Fossil and Suunto. Tissot would later introduce the first compatible watch to feature a touchscreen, and Swatch would release the first compatible watch, largely tailored towards younger consumers. As smartwatches were the first type of devices to make use of the technology, they became the de facto type of device that represented it.

In 2006, Oregon Scientific released the second type of SPOT device, a weather station that displayed regional weather forecasts and other various types of information. A second generation of smartwatches was also released, and were designed to address the shortcomings observed in first generation models. Later that year, Melitta released the third type of device to utilize the technology: a coffee maker that displayed weather forecasts on an electronic visual display. Garmin released the first SPOT-compatible GPS navigation units in 2007.

In early 2008, Microsoft announced that MSN Direct would be available for Windows Mobile, and in early 2009, the service would receive additional location-based enhancements.

=== Discontinuation ===
Production of SPOT watches ceased in 2008. In 2009, Microsoft announced that it would discontinue the MSN Direct service at the beginning of 2012. The company stated that this decision was due to decreased demand for the service and because of the emergence of more efficient and popular forms of data distribution, such as Wi-Fi. The MSN Direct service continued to support existing SPOT devices until transmissions ceased on January 1, 2012.

== Overview ==
SPOT extended functionality of traditional devices to include features not originally envisaged for them; a SPOT-powered coffeemaker, for example, would be able to display information such as weather forecasts on an electronic visual display. Smartwatches featured digital watch displays, referred to as Channels, that presented information in a manner that could be customized by a user—a user could also specify the default channel to be displayed; this feature was functionally analogous with a home screen commonly seen in mobile operating systems. Additional channels could be downloaded from a specialized website, and a Glance feature would allow a user to cycle through downloaded information.

Manufacturers could also add their own features to SPOT-based devices; as an example, a manufacturer could create its own smartwatch channel in order to distinguish its product from a competitor's product. Each SPOT-based device included a unique identification number used to enable secure authentication and encryption of DirectBand signals. Microsoft also reportedly considered an alarm function for SPOT-based smartwatches that would activate in the event of theft.

SPOT relied on the .NET Micro Framework for the creation and management of embedded device firmware. This technology would later be used for the Windows SideShow feature introduced in Windows Vista, which shares design similarities with SPOT. In 2007, five years after SPOT was announced, Microsoft released the first software development kit for the .NET Micro Framework.

== See also ==
- Internet of things
- .NET Framework
- .NET Compact Framework
- Microsoft Band
- Smart Display
- Windows CE
- Windows SideShow
