= Windows Vista editions =

Windows Vista—a major release of the Microsoft Windows operating system—was available in six different product editions: Starter, Home Basic, Home Premium, Business, Enterprise, and Ultimate. On September 5, 2006, Microsoft announced the USD pricing for editions available through retail channels; the operating system was later made available to retail on January 30, 2007. Microsoft also made Windows Vista available for purchase and download from Windows Marketplace; it is the first version of Windows to be distributed through a digital distribution platform. Editions sold at retail were available in both Full and Upgrade versions and later included Service Pack 1 (SP1).

Microsoft characterized the retail packaging for Windows Vista as "designed to be user-friendly, a small, hard, plastic container designed to protect the software inside for life-long use"; it opens sideways to reveal the Windows Vista DVD suspended in a clear plastic case. Windows Vista optical media use a holographic design with vibrant colors.

With the exception of Windows Vista Starter, all editions support both IA-32 (32-bit) and x64 (64-bit) processor architectures. Microsoft ceased distribution of retail copies of Windows Vista in October 2010; OEM distribution of Windows Vista ended in October 2011.

== Editions for personal computers ==
Windows Vista Starter desktop, as denoted by the watermark on the bottom right corner

Windows Vista Starter
Much like its predecessor, Windows XP Starter Edition, Windows Vista Starter was available in emerging markets; it was sold across 139 developing countries in 70 different languages. Microsoft did not make it available in developed technology markets such as the United States, Canada, the European Union, Australia, New Zealand, or other high income markets as defined by the World Bank. Windows Vista Starter has significant limitations; it disallows the concurrent operation of more than three programs (although an unlimited number of windows can be opened for each program unlike in Windows XP Starter); disallows users from sharing files or printers over a home network (or sharing a connection with other computers); does not support Windows Media Player media streaming or sharing; displays a permanent watermark in the bottom right corner of the screen, does not support Windows Aero, and imposes a maximum amount of 120 GB hard disk space and a physical memory limit of 1 GB. However, the memory limit is not actually enforced. Peer-to-peer networking is also disabled, and there is no support for simultaneous SMB connections.
Consumer-oriented features such as Games Explorer, Parental Controls, Windows Calendar, Windows Mail, Windows Movie Maker (without support for high-definition video), Windows Photo Gallery (without support for sharing photos or themed slideshows), Windows Speech Recognition, and Windows Sidebar are included.
Windows Vista Starter is licensed to run only on PCs with AMD's Athlon XP, Duron, Sempron and Geode processors, Intel's Celeron, Pentium III processors, and certain models of Pentium 4. Windows Vista Starter can be installed from optical media including those belonging to other editions of the operating system.
Windows Vista Starter includes a different set of desktop wallpapers not found in other editions.
Windows Vista Home Basic
Similar to Windows XP Home Edition, the Home Basic edition targets budget-conscious users not requiring advanced multimedia support for home use. The Windows Aero graphical user interface with translucent glass and lighting effects is absent from this edition; however, desktop composition—albeit without Flip 3D or Live Thumbnails—is supported. Home Basic does not include Windows DVD Maker or Windows Media Center (or support for Extenders). Premium games including Chess Titans, Inkball, Mahjong Titans are not included. Windows HotStart is also available.
Home Basic supports one physical CPU, but with multiple cores, and the 64-bit version supports up to 8 GB of RAM.
Windows Vista Home Premium
Containing all features from Home Basic and similar to Windows XP Media Center Edition, Windows Vista Home Premium includes additional features dedicated to the home market segment. Full Windows Aero and desktop composition is available. Multimedia features include DVD burning with Windows DVD Maker, and HDTV and Xbox 360 support with Windows Media Center. Premium games (Chess Titans, InkBall, and Mahjong Titans) are available. Enhanced networking features include ad hoc support, projectors, and up to 10 simultaneous SMB connections (compared to 5 in Home Basic); Windows Meeting Space, while included in Home Basic, only allowed users to join meetings—in Home Premium, users may either create new meetings or join existing ones. Home Premium also introduces Windows Mobility Center, Windows SideShow, and Windows Tablet PC and Touch features such as support for capacitive touchscreens, flick gestures, Snipping Tool, and Tablet PC Input Panel (which has been updated since Windows XP to include AutoComplete, as well as handwriting personalization and training features). Backup and Restore additionally supports backup schedules, backup to network devices, and incremental backups.
Windows Vista Home Premium—like Home Basic—supports only one physical CPU, but it additionally supports multiple cores. The 64-bit version supports up to 16 GB of RAM.
Windows Vista Business
Comparable to Windows XP Professional, Windows Vista Business Edition targets the business market. It includes all the features of Home Basic with the exception of Parental Controls and can join a Windows Server domain. It includes Encrypting File System, Internet Information Services, Offline Files, Remote Desktop, Rights Management Services, Shadow Copy, and Windows Fax and Scan. Backup and Restore also allows users to create disk images of operating system installations.
Windows Vista Business supports up to two physical CPUs, and the 64-bit version supports 128 GB of RAM.
Windows Vista Enterprise
This edition targets the enterprise segment of the market: it comprises a superset of the Vista Business edition. Additional features include BitLocker, Multilingual User Interface (MUI), and UNIX application support. Windows Vista Enterprise was not available through retail or OEM channels, but was instead distributed through Microsoft Software Assurance (SA), with license terms that conferred the right to operate up to four virtual machines with various Windows Vista editions installed, access to Virtual PC Express, and activation via volume licensing.
Windows Vista Enterprise supports up to two physical CPUs, and the 64-bit version supports up to 128 GB of RAM.
Windows Vista Ultimate

"Windows Vista Product Red" gadgets

Windows Vista Ultimate includes all features of the Home Premium and Business editions, as well as BitLocker and MUI; it also provides access to optional "Ultimate Extras." Windows Vista Ultimate supports up to two physical CPUs, and the 64-bit version supports up to 128 GB of RAM.
Microsoft released two special edition variants of Windows Vista Ultimate: Windows Vista Ultimate Signature Edition featured a unique production number alongside the signature of Bill Gates on the front of the packaging; the edition was limited to 25,000 copies. Windows Vista Product Red was produced as part of the Product Red program, with a portion of sales supporting The Global Fund to Fight AIDS, Tuberculosis and Malaria. The edition was originally distributed as pre-loaded software on a line of Product Red-branded Dell PCs, but was later released at retail. Besides including an additional desktop theme with wallpapers and other content, it is otherwise identical to the main Windows Vista Ultimate SKU.
Internally, Microsoft released a Windows Vista Handcrafted variant of the Windows Vista Ultimate SKU for employees involved with the development of Windows Vista; it features a custom box alongside a note to employees, but is otherwise identical to the Ultimate SKU.

== Distribution ==
Users could purchase and download Windows Vista directly from Microsoft through the Windows Marketplace before the service's discontinuation.

Optical media distributed through retail or through OEMs for Windows Vista are identical; Microsoft refers to this as "CD unification." Before Windows Vista, versions of Windows for OEMs and retail were maintained separately. All editions of Windows Vista—excluding Enterprise—are stored on the same optical media; a license key for the edition purchased determines which version on the disc is eligible for installation. To upgrade to a higher edition from a lower edition (such as from Home Basic to Ultimate) Windows Vista includes Windows Anytime Upgrade to facilitate an upgrade. For computers with optical disc drives that supported CDs but not DVDs, Microsoft offered CDs for Windows Vista that could be purchased from its website. The company would later release alternative media for Windows Vista SP1.

A Windows Vista Family Discount program enabled United States and Canada customers who purchased the Ultimate edition before June 30, 2007 to purchase additional licenses for Windows Vista Home Premium at a cost of $49.99 each. Microsoft sold these licenses online through its website. In addition, eligible students in qualifying regions had the option to purchase the upgrade version of the Home Premium edition at a reduced price. A similar offer was later available for Windows Vista Ultimate.

=== 64-bit versions ===
To support x64 platforms such as Intel Xeon, Intel Core 2, AMD Opteron and AMD Athlon 64, Microsoft released x64 versions of every edition of Windows Vista except for the Starter edition. These editions can run 32-bit programs within the WOW64 subsystem. Most 32-bit programs can run natively, though applications that rely on device drivers will not run unless those device drivers have been written for x64 platforms. Reviewers have reported that the x64 editions of Windows Vista outperform their IA-32 counterparts in benchmarks such as PassMark.

All 32-bit editions of Windows Vista, excluding Starter, support up to 4 GB of RAM. The 64-bit edition of Home Basic supports 8 GB of RAM, Home Premium supports 16 GB, and Business, Enterprise, and Ultimate support 128 GB of RAM.

All 64-bit versions of Microsoft operating systems impose a 16 TB limit on address space. Processes created on the 64-bit editions of Windows Vista can have 8 TB in virtual memory for user processes and 8 TB for kernel processes to create a virtual memory of 16 TB.

=== Editions for specific markets ===
In March 2004, the European Commission fined Microsoft for €497 million (about US$603 million) and ordered the company to provide a version of Windows without Windows Media Player. The Commission concluded that Microsoft "broke European Union competition law by leveraging its near monopoly in the market for PC operating systems onto the markets for work group server operating systems and for media players." Microsoft reached an agreement with the Commission where it would release a court-compliant version, Windows XP Edition N, that does not include the company's Windows Media Player but instead encourages users to download and install their preferred media player.

Similarly, in December 2005, the Korean Fair Trade Commission ordered Microsoft to make available editions of Windows XP and Windows Server 2003 that do not contain Windows Media Player or Windows Messenger. Similar to the European Commission, this decision was based on the grounds that Microsoft had abused its dominant position in the market to push other products onto consumers. Unlike that decision, however, Microsoft was also forced to withdraw the non-compliant versions of Windows from the South Korean market. This decision resulted in Microsoft's releasing "K" and "KN" variants of the Home and Professional editions of Windows XP in August 2006.

As a continuance of these requirements, Microsoft released "N" variants of some editions of Windows Vista that exclude Windows Media Player, as well as "K" and "KN" editions that include links to third-party media player and instant messaging software. "N" editions of Windows Vista require third-party software (or a separate installation of Windows Media Player) to play audio CDs and other media formats such as MPEG-4.

== Editions for embedded systems ==
Two additional editions of Windows Vista have been released for use by developers of embedded devices. These are binary identical editions to those available in retail, but licensed exclusively for use in embedded devices.

Windows Vista Business for Embedded Systems
This edition mirrors the feature set of the Business edition of Windows Vista.
Windows Vista Ultimate for Embedded Systems
This edition mirrors the feature set of the Ultimate edition of Windows Vista. Accordingly, it includes capabilities not found in Vista Business for Embedded Systems such as BitLocker Drive Encryption, the Subsystem for UNIX-based Applications, and Virtual PC Express.

== Upgrading ==
Upgrade paths from Windows XP and between different Vista editions. Dotted lines indicate the need for a "clean install".

Unlike previous versions of Windows, Windows Vista does not support compliance checking during installation; compliance checking previously allowed users to insert a disc as evidence that the operating system was being upgraded over a previous version, which would allow users to enter an upgrade license to perform a clean install. As a result, Upgrade versions of Windows Vista will not install unless a previous version of Windows is already installed on the machine to be upgraded. A workaround for this limitation was reported by Paul Thurrott, who stated that users should be able to perform a full installation of Windows Vista through Upgrade media by bypassing the prompt to enter a license during setup, and then, once installed, reinstall the operating system over the previous installation—this essentially allows users who purchased the Upgrade version to perform a full retail installation. While the workaround is indeed possible, Microsoft has cautioned that users who perform a full installation of the operating system through this method without a genuine license for a previous version would be in violation of the Windows Vista end-user license agreement.

Users can upgrade from Windows XP to Windows Vista, or upgrade from one edition of Windows Vista to another. However, upgrading from a 32-bit edition to a 64-bit edition or downgrading from 64-bit edition to a 32-bit edition requires a clean install. In addition, not all potential upgrade combinations are supported. The following chart indicates the possible upgrade paths:

| Version and its specific edition of Windows to upgrade from | Edition of Windows Vista to upgrade to | | | | | |
| Version and its specific edition of Windows to upgrade from | Starter | Home Basic | Home Premium | Business | Ultimate | Enterprise |
|---|---|---|---|---|---|---|
| XP Starter | Yes | Yes | Yes | Yes | Yes | No |
| XP Home | No | Yes | Yes | Yes | Yes | No |
| XP Professional | No | No | No | Yes | Yes | No |
| XP Media Center 2005 | No | No | Yes | No | Yes | No |
| XP Media Center 2004 | No | No | Yes | No | Yes | No |
| XP Media Center 2002 | No | No | No | No | No | No |
| XP Tablet PC | No | No | No | Yes | Yes | No |
| XP Professional x64 | No | No | No | No | No | No |
| XP Embedded | No | No | No | No | No | No |
| Vista Starter | —N/a | No | No | No | Yes | No |
| Vista Home Basic | No | —N/a | Yes | No | Yes | No |
| Vista Home Premium | No | No | —N/a | No | Yes | No |
| Vista Business | No | No | No | —N/a | Yes | Yes |
| Vista Ultimate | No | No | No | No | —N/a | No |
| Vista Enterprise | No | No | No | No | Yes | —N/a |

Notes:

- Only Windows XP can be upgraded to Windows Vista; a clean install is required for PCs running Windows 2000 or earlier versions.
- Service Pack 2 is required to upgrade to Windows Vista.
- Windows XP Media Center 2002 can be upgraded to Media Center 2004, allowing an upgrade to Vista, by installing Service Pack 2.
- While it is possible to upgrade from Windows XP Media Center Edition to Windows Vista Home Premium if the computer was joined to an Active Directory Domain at the time of upgrade, the computer will remain joined to the domain but no users will be able to log into the computer through the domain controller. Windows Vista Home Premium does not support joining an Active Directory Domain.

== Comparison chart ==
Windows Vista edition comparison chart
| Features | Starter | Home Basic^{1,2} | Home Premium^{2} | Business^{1,2,3} | Enterprise^{1,2} | Ultimate^{2} |
|---|---|---|---|---|---|---|
| Licensing scheme | OEM licensing in emerging markets | Retail, DSP and OEM | | Retail, DSP, OEM and volume | Volume | Retail, DSP and OEM |
| Maximum RAM on IA-32 | 4 GB, license allows for 1 GB | 4 GB | | | | |
| Maximum RAM on x64 | —N/a | 8 GB | 16 GB | 128 GB | | |
| Maximum physical CPUs | 1 | | | 2 | | |
| Simultaneous SMB peer network connections | —N/a | 5 | 10 | | | |
| Number of running applications | 3 | Unlimited | Unlimited | Unlimited | Unlimited | Unlimited |
| Windows Movie Maker | Partial (no support for HD content creation) | Partial (no support for HD content creation) | Yes | Partial (no support for HD content creation)^{4} | Partial (no support for HD content creation) | Yes |
| Windows Mobility Center^{5} | Partial | Partial^{6} | Yes | Yes | Yes | Yes |
| Games Explorer | Yes | Yes | Yes | Yes | Yes | Yes |
| Accessibility Settings and Ease of Access Center | Yes | Yes | Yes | Yes | Yes | Yes |
| Instant Search | Yes | Yes | Yes | Yes | Yes | Yes |
| Windows ReadyDrive | Yes | Yes | Yes | Yes | Yes | Yes |
| Windows Speech Recognition | Yes | Yes | Yes | Yes | Yes | Yes |
| Application Compatibility features | Yes | Yes | Yes | Yes | Yes | Yes |
| Improved VPN support | No | Yes | Yes | Yes | Yes | Yes |
| Improved power management | Yes | Yes | Yes | Yes | Yes | Yes |
| Windows HotStart | No | Yes | Yes | Yes | Yes | Yes |
| Network Diagnostics and troubleshooting | Yes | Yes | Yes | Yes | Yes | Yes |
| Improved wireless networking | Yes | Yes | Yes | Yes | Yes | Yes |
| Parental Controls | Yes | Yes | Yes | No | No | Yes |
| Universal game controller support | Yes | Yes | Yes | Disabled by default | Disabled by default | Yes |
| Sync Center | Partial | Yes | Yes | Yes | Yes | Yes |
| Network and Sharing Center | No Share center | Yes | Yes | Yes | Yes | Yes |
| Improved peer networking | No P2P | Yes | Yes | Yes | Yes | Yes |
| Network Access Protection Client Agent | No | Yes | Yes | Yes | Yes | Yes |
| Desktop Window Manager | No | Yes | Yes | Yes | Yes | Yes |
| Ad hoc backup and recovery of user files and folders | No | Yes | Yes | Yes | Yes | Yes |
| Pluggable logon authentication architecture | No | Yes | Yes | Yes | Yes | Yes |
| Windows Aero | No | Partial (desktop composition only) | Yes | Yes | Yes | Yes |
| Windows Meeting Space | No P2P meeting | View only | Yes | Yes | Yes | Yes |
| Windows Mobility Center | Not available | No Presentation Settings | Yes | Yes | Yes | Yes |
| Scheduled backup of user files | No | No | Yes | Yes | Yes | Yes |
| Windows Tablet PC with integrated pen and digital ink input | No | No | Yes | Yes | Yes | Yes |
| Windows Tablet PC touch screen support | No | No | Yes | Yes | Yes | Yes |
| Windows Tablet PC handwriting recognition improvements | No | No | Yes | Yes | Yes | Yes |
| Windows Tablet PC usability and navigation improvements | No | No | Yes | Yes | Yes | Yes |
| Windows SideShow | No | No | Yes | Yes | Yes | Yes |
| Premium games^{7} | No | No | Yes | Disabled by default | Disabled by default | Yes |
| Windows Media Center | No | No | Yes | No | No | Yes |
| Windows DVD Maker | No | No | Yes | No | No | Yes |
| Themed slide shows | No | No | Yes | No | No | Yes |
| Native DVD playback | No | No | Yes | No | No | Yes |
| Complete PC Backup | No | No | No | Yes | Yes | Yes |
| Small Business Resources | No | No | No | Yes | Yes (optional) | Yes |
| Joining Windows Server domains | No | No | No | Yes | Yes | Yes |
| Windows Fax and Scan | No | No | No | Yes | Yes (optional) | Yes |
| Remote Desktop Services | No | No | No | Yes | Yes | Yes |
| Group Policy | No | No | No | Yes | Yes | Yes |
| Encrypting File System | No | No | No | Yes | Yes | Yes (Enhancements available in Windows Ultimate Extras) |
| Wireless network provisioning | No | No | No | Yes | Yes | Yes |
| Desktop deployment tools for managed networks | No | No | No | Yes | Yes | Yes |
| Policy-based quality of service for networking | No | No | No | Yes | Yes | Yes |
| Windows Rights Management Services (RMS) Client | No | No | No | Yes | Yes | Yes |
| Control over installation of device | No | No | No | Yes | Yes | Yes |
| Remote Server Administration Tools support (requires Service Pack 1) | No | No | No | With update (KB941314) | With update (KB941314) | With update (KB941314) |
| BitLocker | No | No | No | No | Requires TPM 1.2 or USB Flash drive | Requires TPM 1.2 or USB Flash drive |
| Multilingual User Interface | No | No | No | No | Yes | Yes |
| Subsystem for UNIX-based applications | No | No | No | No | Yes | Yes |
| DirectAccess | No | No | No | No | Yes | Yes |
| Windows Ultimate Extras | No | No | No | No | No^{8,9} | Yes |
| Features | Starter | Home Basic^{1,2} | Home Premium^{2} | Business^{1,2,3} | Enterprise^{1,2} | Ultimate^{2} |

Notes:

1. Home Basic, Business and Enterprise editions are available in the South Korean and European markets as "KN" and "N" editions, respectively, which exclude Windows Media Player and HD components of Windows Movie Maker.
2. All editions except Starter are available in the Korean market as "K" editions, which are sold in place of the standard editions of Windows Vista. Unlike the "KN" editions, the "K" editions do include Windows Media Player and its related components, and also include links to web sites which list third-party media player and instant messaging software.
3. Windows Vista Business N is available in the European market. By default, it does not include Windows Media Player and its related components, or Windows Movie Maker.
4. Windows Movie Maker is not available in Windows Vista Business KN.
5. Windows Mobility Center is available on mobile PCs (notebook PCs, Tablet PCs, and Ultra-mobile PCs) but not on desktop PCs. The rotate screen functionality is offered only on Tablet PCs with an appropriate driver.
6. Presentation settings on Windows Mobility Center are not available on Home Basic.
7. Premium Windows Vista games, including Chess Titans, InkBall, and Mahjong Titans, are available in Windows Vista Home Premium and Windows Vista Ultimate. Windows Vista games are also available as optional components in the Business and Enterprise editions, but are not installed by default.
8. BitLocker Drive Preparation Tool, part of the BitLocker and EFS enhancements Ultimate extra, was available separately on Microsoft's website for Enterprise editions.
9. Language packs, while not listed on Windows Update for Enterprise editions, could be downloaded from Microsoft and installed manually.

== See also ==
- Windows Anytime Upgrade
- Windows Ultimate Extras
- Windows 2000 editions
- Windows 7 editions
