= Microsoft XP =

Microsoft XP may refer to:

- Windows XP editions, especially:
  - Windows XP Home and Professional Editions
  - Windows XP 64-Bit Edition (For Itanium processors)
  - Windows XP x64 Edition (For x86-64 processors)
  - Windows Server 2003, a product from the Windows XP era for server applications
  - Windows Fundamentals for Legacy PCs, a stripped-down version of Windows XP
- Microsoft Office XP, released prior to Windows XP, even though XP is better known to refer to the Windows OS

== See also ==
- AMD Athlon XP, a microprocessor marketed for Windows XP to run on, hence the name.
