= Windows Fax and Scan =

Windows system application

- Windows Fax and Scan running on Windows 10
- Developer: Microsoft
- Stable release: 10.0.26100.8328 / April 30, 2026; 22 days ago
- Operating system: Windows 10, 11; Discontinued: Windows 7, 8, 8.1 (2024); Windows Vista (2020)
- Predecessor: Fax Services of Windows XP
- Type: Fax and scan application

Windows Fax and Scan is an integrated faxing and scanning application introduced in Windows Vista and included in the Business, Enterprise, and Ultimate Windows Vista editions as the replacement for the Fax Console of Windows XP; it is available in all versions of Windows 7, Windows 8, Windows 10 (x86/x64) and Windows 11 (x64), but not on ARM64 versions of Windows 10 and Windows 11.

Windows Fax and Scan supports sending and receiving faxes, faxing or emailing scanned documents, and forwarding faxes as email attachments.

== Features ==
With Windows Fax and Scan users with computers that have fax modems can send and receive faxes, and fax scanned documents. Without a fax modem, users can email scanned documents and forward faxes as email attachments from their computer. WFS supports one-click scanning of documents from locally connected scanners, network-connected scanners and multifunction devices. Even though this can be used for most types of documents, WFS is optimized for scanning, viewing and storing text documents.

WFS is available in Windows Vista Ultimate and as an optional component in Windows Vista Enterprise. WFS is not available on Vista Home Basic or Vista Home Premium. It is also available in all x86 and x64 versions of Windows 7, Windows 8, Windows Server 2008 and Windows Server 2012.

== Faxing ==
The Fax View of WFS is an enhancement of the Fax Services component which was an installable option in the Windows XP operating system. New features include a fax account model, improved composition features, the ability to save faxes in composition as drafts, and a preview pane. It is also possible to right click on a file and send it as a fax. To send and receive faxes users can create either a local fax modem account to use a locally attached fax-capable modem or a shared fax server account to use a network fax server. The Windows Fax and Scan software is not an internet fax application. Therefore, it must be used with an analog phone line.

== Scanning ==
The Scan View of WFS has a user interface to manage scanned documents. It allows the creation, renaming and moving of folders from a single view. The preview pane shows documents scanned. Users can create profiles for particular scanners and save them for future scanning, and can directly route the scanned documents to their mailboxes after configuring the mail settings. The 'Fax from Scanner' feature allows directly faxing the document from the scanner.

== See also ==
- Microsoft Fax
