= Windows Meeting Space =

Discontinued peer-to-peer collaboration program

- The default view of Windows Meeting Space
- Developer(s): Microsoft
- Operating system: Microsoft Windows
- Predecessor: NetMeeting
- Successor: Microsoft Office Live Meeting
- License: Microsoft EULA

Windows Meeting Space (codenamed Windows Shared View and formerly Windows Collaboration) was a peer-to-peer collaboration program developed by Microsoft for Windows Vista as a replacement for Windows NetMeeting and it enables application sharing, collaborative editing, desktop sharing, file sharing, projecting, and simple text-based or ink-based instant messaging across up to 10 users connected to the same network or across the Internet. Meeting Space has the ability to automatically set up an ad hoc wireless network if a connection to a network or the Internet is not available; it also enables participants to invite other people to meeting sessions. It is the first application for the new peer-to-peer framework in Windows Vista and hence requires IPv6.

NetMeeting features such as microphone support and the ability to set up audio or video conferences are not available. Meeting Space is included in all editions of Windows Vista, but its functionality is unavailable in the Starter edition; in the Home Basic edition, it only allows users to join—but not create—sessions. With the release of Windows 7, Microsoft discontinued Meeting Space and recommended Microsoft Office Live Meeting as a replacement.

== History ==
Meeting Space is a result of Microsoft's peer-to-peer collaboration efforts—with an emphasis on mobile computing—discussed during WinHEC 2004 when Windows Vista was codenamed "Longhorn." At that time, it was reported that Windows Vista would enable users to create "ad hoc wireless networks for file sharing and to discover people who are connected nearby." Meeting Space relies on this functionality for its services.

Meeting Space was later demonstrated by Jim Allchin and Darryn Dieken at PDC 2005 where it projected a shared PowerPoint presentation. Allchin said this demonstration was not to illustrate functions of the application itself—development of which was not complete—but to illustrate select capabilities of the peer-to-peer framework in Windows Vista. In a later interview with Paul Thurrott, Allchin expressed desire for developers to create applications supporting peer-to-peer capabilities.

With the release of Windows 7, Microsoft discontinued Windows Meeting Space and recommended Microsoft Office Live Meeting as a replacement.

== Overview and features ==
On starting a session, a workspace, which contains a presentation area, is displayed. A list of notes are also shown. A list of users in the local subnet, with whom a collaboration session can be started, are automatically detected by using the People Near Me functionality, based on WS-Discovery in the peer-to-peer networking implementation in Windows Vista. Users outside the local subnet must be sent an e-mail or file invitation to participate. Applications can be shared in the session, which will be local to that session only. When an application is shared, Windows Meeting Space switches into presentation mode so that participants can see what the presenter is working on and collaboratively edit or review the shared application instance.

== See also ==
- Microsoft SharePoint Workspace
- MSN Messenger
- Windows Live Messenger
- Windows Vista networking technologies
