= Windows 7 editions =

Windows 7, a major release of the Microsoft Windows operating system, has been released in several editions since its original release in 2009. Only Home Premium, Professional, and Ultimate were widely available at retailers (with Enterprise being available for big businesses, companies etc.). The other editions focus on other markets such as the software development world. All editions support 32-bit IA-32 CPUs and all editions except Starter support 64-bit x64 CPUs. 64-bit installation media are not included in Home-Basic edition packages, but can be obtained separately from Microsoft.

According to Microsoft, the features for all editions of Windows 7 are stored on the machine, regardless of which edition is in use. Users who wish to upgrade to an edition of Windows 7 with more features were able to use Windows Anytime Upgrade to purchase the upgrade and to unlock the features of those editions, until it was discontinued in 2015. Microsoft announced Windows 7 pricing information for some editions on June 25, 2009, and Windows Anytime Upgrade and Family Pack pricing on July 31, 2009.

Mainstream support for all Windows 7 editions ended on January 13, 2015, and extended support ended on January 14, 2020. After that, the operating system ceased receiving further support. Professional and Enterprise volume licensed editions had paid Extended Security Updates (ESU) available until at most January 10, 2023. Since October 31, 2013, Windows 7 is no longer available in retail, except for remaining stocks of the preinstalled Professional edition, which was officially discontinued on October 31, 2016.

== Main editions ==
Windows 7 Starter Desktop

Windows 7 Starter
Windows 7 Starter is the edition of Windows 7 that contains the fewest features. It was only available in a 32-bit version, does not include the Windows Aero theme, and the desktop wallpaper cannot be changed. It was initially intended to be restricted to running up to three simultaneous programs like previous Starter releases of Windows, however this was dropped in the final release. It only supports up to 2 GB of RAM.
This edition was available pre-installed on computers, especially netbooks or Windows Tablets, through system integrators or computer manufacturers using OEM licenses.
Windows 7 Home Basic
Windows 7 Home Basic was available in "emerging markets", in 141 countries. Some Windows Aero options are excluded along with several new features. This edition was available in both 32-bit and 64-bit versions and supports up to 8 GB of RAM. Home Basic, along with other editions sold in emerging markets, includes geographical activation restriction, which requires users to activate Windows within a certain region or country.
Windows 7 Home Premium
This edition contains features aimed at the home market segment, such as Windows Media Center, Windows Aero and multi-touch support. It supports up to 16 GB of RAM and was available in both 32-bit and 64-bit versions.
Windows 7 Professional
This edition is targeted towards enthusiasts, small-business users, and schools. It includes all the features of Windows 7 Home Premium, and adds the ability to participate in a Windows Server domain. Additional features include support for up to 192 GB of RAM (increased from 16 GB), up to two physical CPUs, operating as a Remote Desktop server, location aware printing, backup to a network location, Encrypting File System, Presentation Mode, Software Restriction Policies (but not the extra management features of AppLocker) and Windows XP Mode. It was available in both 32-bit and 64-bit versions.
Windows 7 Enterprise
This edition targeted the enterprise segment of the market and was sold through volume licensing to companies which have a Software Assurance (SA) contract with Microsoft. Additional features include support for Multilingual User Interface (MUI) packages, BitLocker Drive Encryption, and UNIX application support. Not available through retail or OEM channels, this edition is distributed through SA. As a result, it includes several SA-only benefits, including a license allowing the operating of diskless nodes (diskless PCs) and activation via Volume License Key (VLK).
Windows 7 Ultimate
Windows 7 Ultimate is the edition of Windows 7 that contains the most features. It includes all the features of Windows 7 Home Premium and Professional while also adding some additional enterprise-oriented features that were available on the SA-exclusive Windows 7 Enterprise, making it feature-complete with the latter; this edition was also available to home users on an individual license basis. If a Windows 7 Home Premium or Professional user wished to upgrade to Windows 7 Ultimate, they would be able to do so by using Windows Anytime Upgrade, for an additional fee. This service was still available for any users who wish to upgrade. Like Windows 7 Professional, it supports up to 192 GB of RAM and up to two physical CPUs, and was available in both 32-bit and 64-bit versions. Unlike Windows Vista Ultimate, it does not include the Windows Ultimate Extras feature or any other exclusive features that Microsoft has stated.

== Special-purpose editions ==
The main editions also can take the form of one of the following special editions:

N and KN editions
The features in the N and KN Editions are the same as their equivalent full versions, but do not include Windows Media Player or other Windows Media-related technologies, such as Windows Media Center and Windows DVD Maker due to limitations set by the European Union and South Korea, respectively. The cost of the N and KN Editions are the same as the full versions, as the Media Feature Pack for Windows 7 N or Windows 7 KN can be downloaded without charge from Microsoft.

E edition
The features in the E edition are the same as their equivalent full versions, but does not include Internet Explorer due to limitations set by the European Union. The cost of the E edition was intended to be cheaper than the full version, but it was never officially released due to concerns of confusion and replaced by the ballot system, BrowserChoice.eu. Official RTM builds of the E edition do exist, but copies were never sold to consumers through any channel.

Signature Edition
The Signature Edition of Windows 7 is a commemorative edition of Windows 7 Ultimate for those throwing a Windows 7 launch party. It is functionally the same as Windows 7 Ultimate.

== Embedded editions ==
These are the special editions of Windows 7 specially made for embedded systems that has less hardware requirements:

=== Windows Embedded 7 ===
==== Entry ====
The most restricted version, lacking Aero, Windows Media Center, and several "luxury" features.

==== Standard ====
The simple version for embedded systems

===== Professional =====
Includes almost everything, including multi-touch and advanced networking.

===== Compact =====
A mid-tier version often used for digital signage and kiosks.

==== POSReady ====
This version is made specially for Point of Services purpose

=== Windows 7 Professional for Embedded Systems ===
A specialized version of the original Windows 7 Professional for ATMs, kiosks, industrial controllers, etc...

=== Windows 7 Ultimate for Embedded Systems ===
The big brother to its Professional counterpart. It includes every feature found in the retail Ultimate edition, such as BitLocker, AppLocker, and Multilingual User Interface (MUI) support, but is licensed specifically for fixed-function devices (like medical imaging or high-end industrial controllers).

== Upgrade editions ==
In-place upgrade from Windows Vista with Service Pack 1 to Windows 7 is supported if the processor architecture and the language are the same and their editions match (see below). In-place upgrade is not supported for earlier versions of Windows; moving to Windows 7 on these machines requires a clean installation, i.e. removal of the old operating system, installing Windows 7 and reinstalling all previously installed programs. Windows Easy Transfer can assist in this process. Microsoft made upgrade SKUs of Windows 7 for selected editions of Windows XP and Windows Vista. The difference between these SKUs and full SKUs of Windows 7 is their lower price and proof of license ownership of a qualifying previous version of Windows. Same restrictions on in-place upgrading applies to these SKUs as well. In addition, Windows 7 is available as a Family Pack upgrade edition in certain markets, to upgrade to Windows 7 Home Premium only. It gives licenses to upgrade three machines from Vista or Windows XP to the Windows 7 Home Premium edition. These are not full versions, so each machine to be upgraded must have one of these qualifying previous versions of Windows for them to work. In the United States, this offer expired in early December 2009. In October 2010, to commemorate the anniversary of Windows 7, Microsoft once again made Windows 7 Home Premium Family Pack available for a limited time, while supplies lasted.

=== Upgrade compatibility ===
There are two possible ways to upgrade to Windows 7 from an earlier version of Windows:

- In-place install (labeled "Upgrade" in the installer): Constitutes an in-place upgrade from an older version of Windows, where settings and programs are preserved from the existing installation. This option is only sometimes available depending on the editions of Windows being used, and is not available at all unless upgrading from Windows Vista.
- Clean install (labeled "Custom" in the installer): Constitutes replacing a previous installation of Windows with a new one, where the current operating system is erased entirely and is replaced with Windows 7. All settings, including but not limited to user accounts, applications, user settings, music, photos and programs, are moved to the Windows.old and Users.old folders, and previously installed programs will need to be reinstalled. This option is always available and is required for all versions of Windows XP as well as previous versions of Windows prior to XP, which are not eligible for upgrading to Windows 7.

The table below lists which upgrade paths allow for an in-place install. Note that in-place upgrades can only be performed when the previous version of Windows is of the same architecture. If upgrading from a 32-bit installation to a 64-bit installation or downgrading from 64-bit installation to 32-bit installation, a clean install is mandatory regardless of the editions being used.

Version and its specific edition of Windows to upgrade from	Edition of Windows 7 to upgrade to				
Version and its specific edition of Windows to upgrade from	Home Basic	Home Premium	Professional	Enterprise	Ultimate
Vista Home Basic	In-place	In-place	Clean	Clean	In-place
Vista Home Premium	Clean	In-place	Clean	Clean	In-place
Vista Business	Clean	Clean	In-place	In-place	In-place
Vista Enterprise	Clean	Clean	Clean	In-place	Clean
Vista Ultimate	Clean	Clean	Clean	Clean	In-place
XP	Clean	Clean	Clean	Clean	Clean
2000/Me and earlier	Ineligible	Ineligible	Ineligible	Ineligible	Ineligible

In-place installation option available.
Requires clean install.
Ineligible for upgrade pricing; requires full version of Windows and a clean install.

=== Anytime Upgrade editions ===
Microsoft supports in-place upgrades from a lower edition of Windows 7 to a higher one, using the Windows Anytime Upgrade tool. There are currently three retail options available (though it is currently unclear whether they can be used with previous installations of the N versions), however there are no family pack versions of the Anytime Upgrade editions. It was possible to use the Product Key from a Standard upgrade edition to accomplish an in-place upgrade (e.g. Home Premium to Ultimate).

- Starter to Home Premium
- Starter to Professional^{1}
- Starter to Ultimate^{1}
- Home Premium to Professional
- Home Premium to Ultimate
- Professional to Ultimate^{1}

^{1} Available in retail, and at the Microsoft Store

== Derivatives ==
Windows Thin PC
On February 9, 2011, Microsoft announced Windows Thin PC, a branded derivative of Windows Embedded Standard 7 with Service Pack 1, designed as a lightweight version of Windows 7 for installation on low performance PCs as an alternative to using a dedicated thin client device. It succeeded Windows Fundamentals for Legacy PCs, which is based upon Windows XP Embedded, wihch is itself based upon Windows 2000. Windows Thin PC was released on June 6, 2011.
Mainstream support for Windows Thin PC ended on October 11, 2016, and extended support ended on October 12, 2021.

Embedded versions
Windows 7 is also available in two distinct forms of Windows Embedded, named as Windows Embedded Standard 7 (known as Windows Embedded Standard 2011 prior to release, the newest being Windows Embedded Standard 7 with Service Pack 1) and Windows Embedded POSReady 7. Both versions are eligible for Extended Security Updates (ESU) for up to 3 years after their end of extended support dates. In addition, binary identical for Embedded Systems (FES) variants of Professional and Ultimate editions are also available, differing only in licensing, and with their support periods also matching their non-FES variants.
Mainstream support for Windows Embedded 7 Standard ended on October 13, 2015, and extended support ended on October 13, 2020. Mainstream support for Windows Embedded POSReady 7 ended on October 11, 2016, and extended support ended on October 12, 2021. Extended Security Updates (ESU) ended for Windows Embedded 7 Standard on October 10, 2023 and for Windows Embedded POSReady 7 on October 8, 2024.

== Comparison chart ==
Windows 7 edition comparison chart
Features	Starter	Home Basic	Home Premium	Professional	Enterprise	Ultimate
Licensing scheme	OEM licensing	Retail, DSP and OEM licensing in emerging markets	Retail, DSP and OEM licensing	Retail, DSP, OEM and volume licensing	Volume licensing	Retail, DSP and OEM licensing
Maximum physical memory (RAM) (32-Bit)	2 GB	4 GB				
Maximum physical memory (RAM) (64-Bit)	—N/a	8 GB	16 GB	192 GB		
Maximum physical CPUs supported (Note: Not the same as logical processor limits: all editions are limited to 32 logical processors for IA-32 and 256 for x64)	1			2		
Desktop Gadgets	Yes	Yes	Yes	Yes	Yes	Yes
Windows Parental Controls	Yes	Yes	Yes	Yes	Yes	Yes
64-bit edition available?	No	Yes	Yes	Yes	Yes	Yes
Built-in AVCHD support	No	Yes	Yes	Yes	Yes	Yes
Multiple monitors	No	Yes	Yes	Yes	Yes	Yes
Fast user switching	No	Yes	Yes	Yes	Yes	Yes
Desktop Window Manager	No	Yes	Yes	Yes	Yes	Yes
Windows Mobility Center	No	Yes	Yes	Yes	Yes	Yes
Printing via the Internet	No	Yes	Yes	Yes	Yes	Yes
Windows Aero	No	Partial (desktop composition only)	Yes	Yes	Yes	Yes
Built-in DVD (MPEG-2 and Dolby Digital) decoder	No	No	Yes	Yes	Yes	Yes
Multi-touch	No	No	Yes	Yes	Yes	Yes
Windows Media Center	No	No	Yes	Yes	Yes	Yes
Windows Media Player remote media experience (Note: Feature of Windows Media Player which enables the use and control of media libraries on other computers)	No	No	Yes	Yes	Yes	Yes
Premium games included	No	No	Yes	Yes (Note: Disabled by default.)	Yes	Yes
HomeGroup support	Join only	Join only	Create or join	Create or join	Create or join	Create or join
Back up to network with Backup and Restore Center	No	No	No	Yes	Yes	Yes
Act as host for Remote Desktop Services	No	No	No	Yes	Yes	Yes
Dynamic disks	No	No	No	Yes	Yes	Yes
Encrypting File System	No	No	No	Yes	Yes	Yes
Location-aware printing	No	No	No	Yes	Yes	Yes
Presentation mode	No	No	No	Yes	Yes	Yes
Group Policy	No	No	No	Yes	Yes	Yes
Offline files and folder redirection	No	No	No	Yes	Yes	Yes
Windows Server domain joining	No	No	No	Yes	Yes	Yes
Windows XP Mode (Note: Windows Virtual PC including a complete copy of Windows XP with Service Pack 3 using Remote Desktop Protocol to display individual applications integrated with the host OS (Windows 7). Windows XP Mode is available as a free download from Microsoft.)	No	VPC only	VPC only	Yes	Yes	Yes
Software restriction policies	No	No	No	Yes	Yes	Yes
Remote administration tools	No	No	No	Yes	Yes	Yes
Active Directory Lightweight Directory Services (AD LDS) (Note: formerly Active Directory Application Mode (ADAM))	No	No	No	Yes	Yes	Yes
AppLocker	No	No	No	Create policies, but cannot enforce	Create and enforce policies	Create and enforce policies
Aero glass remoting	No	No	No	No	Yes	Yes
Windows Media Player multimedia redirection	No	No	No	No	Yes	Yes
Enterprise search scopes	No	No	No	No	Yes	Yes
Federated search	No	No	No	No	Yes	Yes
BitLocker Drive Encryption	No	No	No	No	Yes	Yes
BranchCache Distributed Cache	No	No	No	No	Yes	Yes
Subsystem for Unix-based Applications	No	No	No	No	Yes	Yes
Supports Multilingual User Interface packages	No	No	No	No	Yes	Yes
Virtual desktop infrastructure (VDI) enhancements	No	No	No	No	Yes	Yes
Virtual desktop infrastructure (VDI) licensed	No	No	No	No	Yes	Yes
VHD booting (Note: Any edition of Windows 7 can be installed onto a VHD volume; these installations even appear in the boot menu. However, only Enterprise or Ultimate editions start. Other editions return an error message.)	No	No	No	No	Yes	Yes
Switching between any of the 37 available languages	No	No	No	No	Yes	Yes
Features	Starter	Home Basic	Home Premium	Professional	Enterprise	Ultimate

== See also ==
- Windows 2000 editions
- Windows XP editions
- Windows Vista editions
- Windows 8 editions
- Windows 10 editions
- Windows 11 editions
