= Windows Anytime Upgrade =

Discontinued service by Microsoft

- Developer: Microsoft
- Release: November 30, 2006; 19 years ago
- Operating system: Microsoft Windows
- Successor: Settings in Windows 10
- Type: Utility software

Windows Anytime Upgrade (Add Features to Windows) was a service by Microsoft introduced in Windows Vista that facilitated upgrades across successive editions of Windows Vista. Prices for upgrades purchased through Windows Anytime Upgrade were lower than prices for upgrades purchased at retail. Windows Anytime Upgrade is included in Windows 7 to allow users to upgrade to Windows 7 editions. In Windows 8 and Windows 8.1 it was rebranded as Add Features to Windows and was used to purchase an upgrade license for the Pro edition or to add Windows Media Center to an existing Pro installation. Support for this feature was discontinued on October 31, 2015.

== History ==
A preliminary version of Anytime Upgrade in Windows Vista build 4093

Windows Anytime Upgrade was in development prior to the development reset of Windows Vista, then known by its codename "Longhorn." A preliminary version of the feature can be seen in build 4093.

On February 26, 2006, Microsoft announced the editions of Windows Vista to be released to retail and original equipment manufacturers (OEMs). After this announcement, various technology-related outlets reported that Anytime Upgrade would enable users to upgrade to successive editions.

== Overview ==
=== Windows Vista ===
The Windows Anytime Upgrade in Vista

All editions of Windows Vista (excluding Enterprise) are stored on the same retail and OEM optical media—a license key for the edition purchased determines which edition is eligible for installation. When first announced, Anytime Upgrade enabled users to purchase a digital license from an online merchant to upgrade their edition of Windows Vista. Once a license had been purchased, a user's product license, billing and other information would be stored within a user's digital locker at the Windows Marketplace digital distribution platform; this would allow a user to retain this information at an off-site location for reference purposes and to reinstall the operating system, if necessary. A user could then initiate an upgrade to the edition for which the license was purchased either through components stored on the hard drive by the OEM of the personal computer, through an Anytime Upgrade DVD supplied by the OEM, or through retail installation media compatible with Anytime Upgrade. If none of these options were available, Anytime Upgrade provided an option for a user to purchase a DVD online and have it delivered by mail.

Microsoft also released retail packaging for Anytime Upgrade. The retail products were made available during the consumer launch of Windows Vista on January 30, 2007. The initial version of these products included only an upgrade license, but this was later modified in May 2007 to include both a DVD and a product license. In an effort to streamline the upgrade process, Microsoft announced that digital license distribution would cease on February 20, 2008; licenses purchased prior to this date would not be affected. As a result of this change, users would be required to purchase the aforementioned retail packaging in order to use Anytime Upgrade functionality and Windows Vista Service Pack 1 omitted the option to purchase a license online. DVDs for Anytime Upgrade were only produced for Windows Vista.

Anytime Upgrade in Windows Vista performs a full reinstallation of the new product edition while retaining the user's data, programs, and settings. This process can take a considerable amount of time, up to a few hours.

=== Windows 7 ===
The Windows Anytime Upgrade in Windows 7

Anytime Upgrade in Windows 7 no longer performs a full reinstallation of Windows. Components for the upgraded editions are instead pre-installed directly in the operating system; a notable result of this change is that the speed of the upgrade process has been significantly increased. Microsoft stated that an upgrade should take approximately 10 minutes. Anytime Upgrade also does not require physical media or additional software. Instead, Windows 7 requires a user to purchase a license online, in a manner similar to the initial functionality that was later removed from Windows Vista starting with Service Pack 1. Microsoft would also release Anytime Upgrade packaging for Windows 7 at retail. The packaging, however, would only include a license for the edition to be upgraded, as Anytime Upgrade in the operating system does not require physical media.

=== Windows 8 and later ===
In Windows 8, the process has changed. Users will need to go to the Control Panel and search for Add Features to Windows. In Windows 10, this is located in Settings > System > About > Change Product Key or Upgrade Your Version of Windows.

==== Results after upgrading ====
This process works the same way as in Windows 7, with a few exceptions:

- If a user purchases a new PC with Windows 8 or later preinstalled, and then the user upgrades that PC with a Windows 8 Pro Pack, Windows 8 Media Center Pack, a volume license edition, or a retail edition, the user will no longer be able to install apps that are provided exclusively from the OEM through the Microsoft Store.
- On Windows 10, when upgrading from Windows 10 Home to Pro or from Home to Pro for Workstations, in addition to the above consequence, the upgraded PC will no longer be supported and is no longer entitled to receive firmware updates from the OEM, even though it will still get Windows operating system updates. Damages that occur due to Windows edition upgrades are not covered under the manufacturer's warranty. However, if the user buys a PC with Windows 10 Pro installed and later upgrades that PC to Pro for Workstations, these consequences do not apply.
- On Samsung Galaxy Book devices starting with the Galaxy Book 4, there is an exception. Like with many other Samsung Galaxy devices, Samsung runs a Knox verification scan to check for a signature match on all operating system elements before booting in the main operating system. If an unauthorized change is detected, even in a Windows edition upgrade (Home to Pro), the eFuse is tripped and the device status changes from Official to Custom. This is because newer Galaxy Books run the custom One UI Book skin instead of stock Windows. When this happens, any warranties and Samsung Care plans associated with the device are void, and some Samsung apps may not work as expected. Re-imaging the device using recovery tools will not revert the eFuse state.

== Region availability ==
When first announced, Anytime Upgrade was available in the United States, Canada, EMEA, European Union, Norway, Switzerland, and Japan, with Microsoft stating that availability of the program would expand after launch of Windows Vista. English version retail packaging for Anytime Upgrade was made available at the consumer launch of Windows Vista for North America and Asia-Pacific regions.

In 2009, Ars Technica reported that Anytime Upgrade retail packaging for Windows 7 may only have been available in regions without broadband Internet access or where retail packaging was ineligible to be offered. Anytime Upgrade was available for Windows 7 in select regions.

== See also ==
- Windows Easy Transfer
- Windows Vista editions
- Windows Ultimate Extras
- Windows 7 editions
