= InkBall =

2004 video game

- Screenshot on Windows Vista
- Developer: Microsoft
- Publisher: Microsoft
- Platform: Windows
- Release: August 2004; 21 years ago
- Genre: Puzzle
- Mode: Single-player

InkBall is a computer game that is included with Windows XP Tablet PC Edition 2005 and Windows Vista. (Note: (except the Starter and Home Basic editions)) It employs the use of a stylus or mouse to draw lines to direct balls into holes of corresponding colors.

== Gameplay ==
Points are awarded for putting colored balls in the correct hole, time left at the end of the round, and for breaking blocks. The game is over when time runs out, or when a ball enters a hole of the wrong color. However, gray is a neutral color and therefore if a gray ball goes into the hole of a different color or if any ball goes into a gray hole nothing will happen. Some blocks have special properties, such as breaking when hit, opening and closing at intervals, changing the ball's color or making the ball accelerate. InkBall has a variety of difficulty levels, ranging from Beginner, to Novice, to Intermediate, to Advanced and finally to Expert. As the difficulty increases, the time to move the balls into their correct hole(s) is dramatically lowered, and the overall complexity of the task increases substantially.

=== Scoring ===
There are two primary ways to score points:

1: When a ball falls in the correct hole, you gain the amount of points based on its color:

Ball color	Points
Gray	0
Red	200
Blue	400
Green	800
Gold	1,600

2: When you complete a level (there are no more balls left), you gain a point for each second left on the timer.

=== Game Elements ===
Game Element	Behavior
Solid wall	Deflects all balls. Is always gray.
Disappearing wall	Disappears when struck by a ball of the same color.
Color wall	Changes a ball into the same color as the wall.
One-way wall	Deflects all balls that approach it from the opposite direction of the arrow, but does not deflect balls that approach it from the same direction as the arrow. Is always gray.
Color-filter wall	Deflects all balls of a different color, but does not deflect balls of the same color.
One-way color-filter wall	Deflects all balls of a different color that approach it from any direction and any balls of the same color that approach it from the opposite direction of the arrow. Does not deflect balls of the same color that approach it in the same direction as the arrow.
Clock wall	Alternates between appearing as a solid wall and disappearing.
Keyhole wall	Disappears temporarily when a ball enters a hole of the same color.
Ramp	Accelerates balls that are moving in the same direction as the arrows, and slows and then reverses the direction of balls that are moving in the opposite direction. Does not affect balls that approach it diagonally or sideways.

== Controls and compatibility ==
On Windows XP Tablet PC Edition, a pen tablet was required to play the game properly, as the mouse cursor was not visible inside the game window. However, pressing Alt twice while playing the game will cause the mouse cursor to show up. In Windows Vista, it can also be played using the mouse without any issues.

InkBall is not available for later versions of Windows, and is removed when users upgrade from Windows XP or Vista to Windows 7.

== Reception ==
Benj Edwards of the website HowToGeek.com ranked it as the 14th best game ever included in Windows, commenting that it is "surprisingly hard to do" but is a "fun challenge". In a preview of the game on prerelease Windows Vista, GameSpot's James Yu thought that InkBall is difficult to play with the mouse as a controller.

== See also ==
- List of games included with Windows
