= Smart Display =

Touchscreen computer project by Microsoft

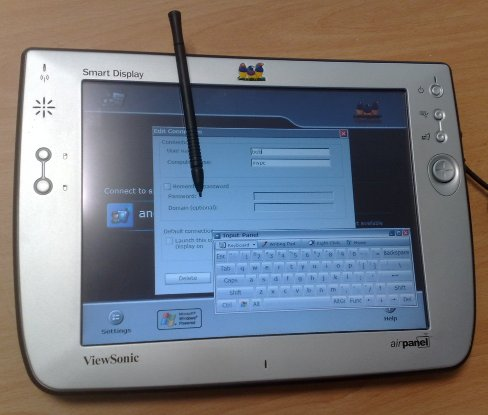
A ViewSonic V150 tablet device

In computing, Smart Display (originally codenamed Mira) was a Microsoft initiative to use a portable touchscreen LCD monitor as a thin client for PCs, connecting via Wi-Fi.

Smart Display was announced in early 2002, released in early 2003 and discontinued in December 2003, having never achieved more than negligible market penetration.

== Technology ==
The Smart Display was a battery-powered 10" or 15" LCD monitor with a touchscreen (similar in size and shape to a Tablet PC), connecting to a PC over an 802.11b WiFi network, with input via Transcriber (similar to Graffiti) or a pop-up soft-keyboard for text entry, and built-in speakers. Some models had a docking unit with wired PC, keyboard and mouse connectors.

The display ran Smart Display OS or Microsoft Windows CE for Smart Displays, based on Windows CE and .NET. The remote technology was based on Windows Terminal Server. Smart Display OS 1.0 would only connect to a Windows XP Professional host system, although some reported that any version of Windows could be remote-controlled using NetMeeting.

ViewSonic was the first manufacturer to bring Smart Display to the market, with the airpanel V150 in early 2003. This included a 15" 1024×768 LCD, a 400 MHz Intel XScale processor, 32MB ROM, 64MB RAM and 802.11b wireless, and a USB wireless hub for the host PC.

== Problems ==
Analysts flagged the problems with the Mira initiative very early on, as soon as it reached their notice in early 2002.

- In Smart Display OS 1.0, the display would lock the host PC to it while in use. Microsoft variously attributed this to licensing issues (that Windows XP Professional was licensed for one user per running copy) and resource management problems. The requirements of licensing – not to allow the devices to work standalone, not to allow the device to connect to the host PC while the PC's main screen was active and not to allow multiple Smart Displays to control one PC – were widely derided in the press.
- Only one Smart Display could connect to a host PC at a time, preventing multiple devices being used in households with access to only one PC.
- Although the devices had similar CPU and memory specifications and operating system to a large Pocket PC, weighed as much as a notebook and had similar battery life, they provided no standalone functionality and were not usable without a host PC. Analyst speculation was that Smart Display was crippled so as not to risk cannibalising the Tablet PC market.
- Video streaming was not possible – the connection was not fast enough and Remote Desktop Protocol contained no enhancements to facilitate video.
- Microsoft had intended the smart displays to sell at around US$500, but the devices eventually reached the market at $1000–1500, whereas comparable notebooks were around $600.

== History ==
Mira was announced by Bill Gates at the 2002 Consumer Electronics Show:

A new set of Windows CE .NET-based technologies, code-named 'Mira', will enable a new generation of smart displays that give people the freedom to experience the power of Windows XP from anywhere in their home. Harnessing the remote desktop and wireless networking features of Windows XP and Windows CE .NET, 'Mira'-enabled smart displays will deliver to consumers the freedom of the complete experiences in Windows, including browsing the Web, sending or receiving e-mail messages, listening to music, and editing and displaying digital images, from any room in the home.

— Bill Gates

The initial announcement mentioned technology partnerships with AboCom, Fujitsu, Intel, LG Electronics, National Semiconductor, NEC, Philips Consumer Electronics, Tatung, TriGem, ViewSonic, Wistron and Wyse.

Smart Display OS 1.0 was supported by several monitor manufacturers, including Samsung, LG, TriGem, Philips, ViewSonic, Fujitsu and NEC. Products included the Fujitsu FMSDP-101, the NEC PK-SD10, the Philips DesXcape, the Trigem Play@PAD and the ViewSonic airpanel.

Smart Display OS 1.5, scheduled for the end of 2003, was intended to allow a PC to connect simultaneously to a monitor and a smart display. Microsoft later changed its timetable to include a release of Smart Display OS 2.0 in late 2004 with additional functions such as mobile image processing.

== Cancellation ==
After having signed up several LCD manufacturers to work on the initiative, some of whom (such as LG) had Smart Display 1.5 products ready for early 2004 release, Microsoft finally announced the cancellation of the initiative on Monday 22 December 2003.

LG stated it would persist with Smart Displays even without Microsoft's assistance, although no products eventuated.

It has been suggested that the Ultra-Mobile PC (UMPC), code-named Origami, is the evolution of the Smart Display.

== See also ==
- Smart Personal Objects Technology
- Miracast

== Sources ==
=== Further reading ===
- Microsoft Unveils Windows CE for Smart Displays Naming (Microsoft press release, 26 June 2002)
- Microsoft Mira hung up on licensing (Matthew Broersma, ZDNet UK, 28 November 2002)
- Meet 'Mira', a .NET-based smart display device technology (WindowsForDevices, 26 June 2002)
- Pogue, David (2 January 2003). "And Now, the Portable Desktop PC, Up to a Point". The New York Times.
- ViewSonic airpanel V150 (Rupert Goodwins, ZDNet UK, 15 April 2003)
- Microsoft Abandons Smart Display Project, Stranding Domestic Monitor Makers (Yoo Hyung-jun, ETNEWS [Korea], Tue 23 December 2003)
- Smart Display Gripes (Computer Gripes, 6 January 2004)
- Microsoft dumps Smart Display (Matt Loney, ZDNet UK, 6 January 2004)
- Smart Displays – good riddance to dumb technology (Matt Loney, ZDNet UK, Tuesday 6 January 2004)
- NEWS FLASH: R.I.P. Smart Displays? (WindowsForDevices, 6 January 2004)
