= Microsoft Software Assurance =

Subscription software licensing and maintenance program

Microsoft Software Assurance (SA) is a Microsoft maintenance program aimed at business users who use Microsoft Windows, Microsoft Office, and other server and desktop applications. The core premise behind SA is to give users the ability to spread payments over several years, while offering "free" upgrades to newer versions during that time period.

== Overview ==
Microsoft differentiates License and Software Assurance. Customers may purchase (depending on the program), a license without Software Assurance, Software Assurance only (but only to be used in combination with an existing license), both a License and Software Assurance together. The three possibilities are not always available, depending on the program (single license or volume license).

== Features ==
The full list of benefits, effective March 2006, are as follows:

- Free upgrades: Subscribers may upgrade to newer versions of their Microsoft software
- Access to exclusive software products: Windows Fundamentals for Legacy PCs, Windows Vista Enterprise Edition, Windows 7 Enterprise Edition, Windows 8 Enterprise Edition and Microsoft Desktop Optimization Pack are only available to Software Assurance customers
- Training: Free training from Microsoft and access to Microsoft E-Learning, a series of interactive online training tools for users. This training can only be taken at a Microsoft Certified Partner for Learning Solutions and can only be redeemed for training that is categorized as Microsoft Official Curriculum.
- Home use: Employees of a company with SA can use an additional copy of Microsoft software
- Access to source code for larger companies (1,500+ desktops)
- 24x7 telephone and web support
- Additional error reporting tools
- Free licenses for additional servers provisioned as "Cold backups" of live servers
- Access to Microsoft TechNet managed newsgroups
- Access to Microsoft TechNet downloads for 1 user
- Extended Hotfix support: Typically Microsoft charges for non-security hotfixes after mainstream support for the product has ended (e.g. 5 years for Windows); this charge is waived for SA customers whose contracts started before 1 July 2017. As of 1 July 2017, Extended Hotfix support is no longer available through Software Assurance.

All benefits are generated by a Benefits Administrator at the customer organization and can be managed on the Microsoft Volume Licensing Service Center.

== Criticism ==
Software Assurance is often criticized for its expense and the lack of "free" software upgrades within the contract period. The development period between major operating system versions often exceeds three years, requiring customers to renew their software assurance for another contract period, in order to get the next upgrade for "free".

== History ==
Software Assurance was part of Licensing 6.0 and initially only provided upgrades, but around the time of the Microsoft Office 2003 release, more benefits were added. In March 2006, Microsoft added Windows Vista Enterprise Edition and Windows Fundamentals for Legacy PCs. In June 2011 Microsoft added Windows Thin PC, a desktop virtualization application that allows locked down versions of Windows 7 to run on older hardware.
