= Windows Mobility Center =

Component of Microsoft Windows

- The Windows Mobility Center application in Windows 11
- Developer: Microsoft
- Initial release: November 30, 2006; 19 years ago
- Operating system: Windows Vista, Windows 7, Windows 8, Windows 8.1, Windows 10, Windows 11

Windows Mobility Center is a component of Microsoft Windows, introduced in Windows Vista, that centralizes information and settings most relevant to mobile computing.

== History ==
A mobility center that displayed device settings pertinent to mobile devices was first shown during the Windows Hardware Engineering Conference of 2004. It was based on the Activity Center user interface design that originated with Microsoft's abandoned Windows "Neptune" project, and was slated for inclusion in Windows Vista, then known by its codename Longhorn.

== Overview ==
The Windows Mobility Center user interface consists of square tiles that each contain information and settings related to a component, such as audio settings, battery life and power schemes, display brightness, and wireless network strength and status. The tiles that appear within the interface depend on the hardware of the system and device drivers.

Windows Mobility Center is located in the Windows Control Panel and also be launched by pressing the ⊞ Win+X keys in Windows Vista and 7. By default, WMC is inaccessible on desktop computers, but this limitation can be bypassed if one modifies the Windows Registry.

Windows Mobility Center is extensible; original equipment manufacturers can customize the interface with additional tiles and company branding. Though not supported by Microsoft, it is possible for individual developers to create tiles for the interface as well.

== See also ==
- Features new to Windows Vista
