= Windows 7 =

2009 Microsoft operating system version

- Version of the Windows NT operating system

- Screenshot of Windows 7, showing its Start Menu, desktop, taskbar, and the glass effect of Windows Aero
- Developer: Microsoft
- Working state: No longer supported
- Source model: Closed-source; Source-available (through Shared Source Initiative)
- Released to manufacturing: July 22, 2009; 17 years ago
- General availability: October 22, 2009; 17 years ago
- Final release: Service Pack 1 with January 2023 monthly update rollup (6.1.7601.26321) / February 8, 2023; 3 years ago
- Marketing target: Consumer and business
- Update method: Windows Update
- Supported platforms: IA-32, x86-64
- Kernel type: Hybrid
- Userland: Windows API, .NET Framework, NTVDM, SUA
- License: Proprietary commercial software
- Preceded by: Windows Vista (2006)
- Succeeded by: Windows 8 (2012)
- Official website: Windows 7 (archived at Wayback Machine)
- Tagline: Your PC, simplified

Support status
- All versions (except Windows Thin PC and some embedded editions as well as Paid Extended Security Updates (ESU) for volume-licensed Professional and Enterprise editions); Mainstream support ended on January 13, 2015. Extended support ended on January 14, 2020. Paid Extended Security Updates (ESU), only for volume-licensed Professional and Enterprise editions: Support ended on January 10, 2023. See § Extended Security Updates for details. Exceptions existed until October 8, 2024. See § Support lifecycle for details.

Windows 7 is a major release of the Windows NT operating system developed by Microsoft. It was released to manufacturing on July 22, 2009, and became generally available on October 22, 2009. It is the successor to Windows Vista, released nearly three years earlier. Windows 7's server counterpart, Windows Server 2008 R2, was released at the same time. It sold over 630 million copies before it was succeeded by Windows 8 in October 2012.

Windows 7 was intended to be an incremental upgrade to Windows Vista, addressing the previous OS's issues while maintaining hardware and software compatibility as well as fixing some of Vista's inconsistencies (such as Vista's aggressive User Account Control). Windows 7 continued improvements on the Windows Aero user interface with the addition of a redesigned taskbar that allows pinned applications, and new window management features. Other new features were added to the operating system, including libraries, the new file-sharing system HomeGroup, and support for multitouch input. A new "Action Center" was also added to provide an overview of system security and maintenance information, and tweaks were made to the User Account Control system to make it less intrusive. Windows 7 also shipped with updated versions of several stock applications, including Internet Explorer 8, Windows Media Player 12, and Windows Media Center.

Unlike Windows Vista, which received a mixed reception at launch, Windows 7 received significant positive reviews from reviewers and consumers, with critics considering the operating system to be a major improvement over its predecessor for its improved performance, intuitive interface, fewer User Account Control pop-ups, and other improvements made across the platform. Windows 7 was a major success for Microsoft; even before its official release, pre-order sales for the operating system on the online retailer Amazon.com had surpassed previous records. In just six months, over 100 million copies were sold worldwide until July 2012. By January 2018, Windows 10 surpassed Windows 7 as the most popular version of Windows worldwide. Windows 11 overtook Windows 7 as the second most popular Windows version on all continents in August 2022.

It is the final version of Microsoft Windows that supports processors without SSE2 or NX (although an update released in 2018, KB4103718, dropped support for non-SSE2 processors).

Extended support ended on January 14, 2020, over 10 years after the release of Windows 7; the operating system ceased receiving further updates after that date. A paid support program was available for enterprises, providing security updates for Windows 7 for up to three years since the official end of life.

== Naming ==
Windows 7 is the successor to Windows Vista, and its version name is Windows NT 6.1, compared to Vista's NT 6.0; its naming caused some confusion when it was announced in 2008. Windows president Steven Sinofsky commented that Windows 95 was the fourth version of Windows, but Windows 7 counts up from Windows NT 4.0 as it is a descendant of NT.

== Development history ==
=== Background ===
Originally, a version of Windows codenamed "Blackcomb" was planned as the successor to Windows XP and Windows Server 2003 in 2000. Major features were planned for Blackcomb, including an emphasis on searching and querying data and an advanced storage system named WinFS to enable such scenarios. However, an interim, minor release, codenamed "Longhorn," was announced for 2003, delaying the development of Blackcomb. By the middle of 2003, however, Longhorn had acquired some of the features originally intended for Blackcomb. After three major malware outbreaks, the Blaster, Nachi, and Sobig worms exploited flaws in Windows operating systems within a short time period in August 2003, Microsoft changed its development priorities, putting some of Longhorn's major development work on hold while developing new service packs for Windows XP and Windows Server 2003. Development of Longhorn (Windows Vista) was also reset, and thus delayed, in August 2004 due to feature creep, and a number of features were cut from Longhorn after the reset. Blackcomb was renamed to Vienna in early 2006, and was later canceled in 2007 due to the scope of the project.

=== Launch of Windows Vista and the Windows 7 Project ===
When released, Windows Vista was criticized for its long development time, performance issues, spotty compatibility with existing hardware and software at launch, changes affecting the compatibility of certain PC games, and unclear assurances by Microsoft that certain computers shipping with XP before launch would be "Vista Capable" (which led to a class-action lawsuit), among other critiques. As such, the adoption of Vista in comparison to XP remained somewhat low. In July 2007, reports indicated that a new project, codenamed Windows 7, would launch within three years, following the cancellation of the Vienna project. Bill Gates, in an interview with Newsweek, suggested that Windows 7 would be more "user-centric". Gates later said that Windows 7 would also focus on performance improvements. Steven Sinofsky later expanded on this point, explaining in the Engineering Windows 7 blog that the company was using a variety of new tracing tools to measure the performance of many areas of the operating system on an ongoing basis, to help locate inefficient code paths and to help prevent performance regressions. Senior Vice President Bill Veghte stated that Windows Vista users migrating to Windows 7 would not find the kind of device compatibility issues they encountered migrating from Windows XP. An estimated 1,000 developers worked on Windows 7. These were broadly divided into "core operating system" and "Windows client experience", in turn organized into 25 teams of around 40 developers on average.

In October 2008, it was announced that Windows 7 would also be the official name of the operating system. There had been some confusion over naming the product Windows 7, while versioning it as 6.1 to indicate its similar build to Windows Vista and increase compatibility with applications that only check major version numbers, similar to Windows 2000 and Windows XP both having 5.x version numbers. The first external release to select Microsoft partners came in January 2008 with Milestone 1, build 6519. Speaking about Windows 7 on October 16, 2008, Microsoft CEO Steve Ballmer confirmed compatibility between Windows Vista and Windows 7, indicating that Windows 7 would be a refined version of Windows Vista.

=== Demonstrations and betas ===
At PDC 2008, Microsoft demonstrated Windows 7 with its reworked taskbar. On December 27, 2008, the Windows 7 Beta was leaked onto the Internet via BitTorrent. According to a performance test by ZDNet, Windows 7 Beta beat both Windows XP and Windows Vista in several key areas, including boot and shutdown time and working with files, such as loading documents. Other areas did not beat XP, including PC Pro benchmarks for typical office activities and video editing, which remain identical to Vista and slower than XP. On January 7, 2009, the x64 version of the Windows 7 Beta (build 7000) was leaked onto the web, with some torrents being infected with a trojan. At CES 2009, Microsoft CEO Steve Ballmer announced the Windows 7 Beta, build 7000, had been made available for download to MSDN and TechNet subscribers in the format of an ISO image. The stock wallpaper of the beta version contained a digital image of the Betta fish.

=== Release candidate and launch of Windows 7 ===
The release candidate, build 7100, became available for MSDN and TechNet subscribers, and Connect Program participants on April 30, 2009. On May 5, 2009, it became available to the general public, although it had also been leaked onto the Internet via BitTorrent. The release candidate was available in five languages and expired on June 1, 2010, with shutdowns every two hours starting March 1, 2010. Microsoft stated that Windows 7 would be released to the general public on October 22, 2009, less than three years after the launch of its predecessor. Microsoft released Windows 7 to MSDN and Technet subscribers on August 6, 2009. Microsoft announced that Windows 7, along with Windows Server 2008 R2, was released to manufacturing in the United States and Canada on July 22, 2009. Windows 7 build 7600.16385.090713-1255, which was compiled on July 13, 2009, was declared the final RTM build after passing all Microsoft's tests internally. Windows 7 was finally released globally to general availability on October 22, 2009.

== Features ==
=== New and changed ===
Windows 7 live thumbnails, showing Internet Explorer 11 tabs

Among Windows 7's new features are advances in touch and handwriting recognition, support for virtual hard disks, improved performance on multi-core processors, improved boot performance, DirectAccess, and kernel improvements. Windows 7 adds support for systems using multiple heterogeneous graphics cards from different vendors (Heterogeneous Multi-adapter), a new version of Windows Media Center, a Gadget for Windows Media Center, improved media features, XPS Essentials Pack, and Windows PowerShell being included, and a redesigned Windows Calculator with multiline capabilities including Programmer and Statistics modes along with unit conversion for length, weight, temperature, and several others. Many new items have been added to the Control Panel, including ClearType Text Tuner, Display Color Calibration Wizard, Gadgets, Recovery, Troubleshooting, Workspaces Center, Location and Other Sensors, Credential Manager, Biometric Devices, System Icons, and Display. Windows Security Center has been renamed to Action Center (Windows Health Center and Windows Solution Center in earlier builds), which encompasses both security and maintenance of the computer. ReadyBoost on 32-bit editions now supports up to 256 gigabytes of extra allocation. Windows 7 also supports images in RAW image format through the addition of Windows Imaging Component-enabled image decoders, which enables raw image thumbnails, previewing and metadata display in Windows Explorer, plus full-size viewing and slideshows in Windows Photo Viewer and Windows Media Center. Windows 7 also has a native TFTP client with the ability to transfer files to or from a TFTP server.

The default taskbar of Windows 7

The taskbar has seen the biggest visual changes, where the old Quick Launch toolbar has been replaced with the ability to pin applications to the taskbar. Buttons for pinned applications are integrated with the task buttons. These buttons also enable Jump Lists to allow quick access to common tasks, and files frequently used with specific applications. The revamped taskbar also allows the reordering of taskbar buttons. To the far right of the system clock is a small rectangular button that serves as the Show desktop icon. By default, hovering over this button makes all visible windows transparent for a quick look at the desktop. In touch-enabled displays such as touch screens, tablet PCs, etc., this button is slightly (8 pixels) wider in order to accommodate being pressed by a finger. Clicking this button minimizes all windows, and clicking it a second time restores them.

Window management in Windows 7 has several new features: Aero Snap maximizes a window when it is dragged to the top, left, or right of the screen. Dragging windows to the left or right edges of the screen allows users to snap software windows to either side of the screen, such that the windows take up half the screen. When a user moves windows that were snapped or maximized using Snap, the system restores their previous state. Snap functions can also be triggered with keyboard shortcuts. Aero Shake hides all inactive windows when the active window's title bar is dragged back and forth rapidly.

Action Center window, showing no problems detected

When the Action Center flag is clicked on, it lists all security and maintenance issues in a small pop-up window.

Windows 7 includes 13 additional sound schemes; they are titled Afternoon, Calligraphy, Characters, Cityscape, Delta, Festival, Garden, Heritage, Landscape, Quirky, Raga, Savanna, and Sonata. Internet Spades, Internet Backgammon and Internet Checkers, which were removed in Windows Vista, were restored in Windows 7. Users are able to disable or customize many more Windows components than was possible in Windows Vista. New additions to this list of components include Internet Explorer 8, Windows Media Player 12, Windows Media Center, Windows Search, and Windows Gadget Platform. A new version of Microsoft Virtual PC, newly renamed as Windows Virtual PC was made available for Windows 7 Professional, Enterprise, and Ultimate editions. It allows multiple Windows environments, including Windows XP Mode, to run on the same machine. Windows XP Mode runs Windows XP in a virtual machine, and displays applications within separate windows on the Windows 7 desktop. Furthermore, Windows 7 supports the mounting of a virtual hard disk (VHD) as a normal data storage, and the bootloader delivered with Windows 7 can boot the Windows system from a VHD; however, this ability is only available in the Enterprise and Ultimate editions. The Remote Desktop Protocol (RDP) of Windows 7 is also enhanced to support real-time multimedia application including video playback and 3D games, thus allowing use of DirectX 10 in remote desktop environments. The three application limit, previously present in the Windows Vista and Windows XP Starter Editions, has been removed from Windows 7. All editions include some new and improved features, such as Windows Search, Security features, and some features new to Windows 7, that originated within Vista. Optional BitLocker Drive Encryption is included with Windows 7 Ultimate and Enterprise. Windows Defender is included; Microsoft Security Essentials antivirus software is a free download. All editions include Shadow Copy, which—every day or so—System Restore uses to take an automatic "previous version" snapshot of user files that have changed. Backup and restore have also been improved, and the Windows Recovery Environment—installed by default—replaces the optional Recovery Console of Windows XP.

A new system known as "Libraries" was added for file management; users can aggregate files from multiple folders into a "Library." By default, libraries for categories such as Documents, Pictures, Music, and Video are created, consisting of the user's personal folder and the Public folder for each. The system is also used as part of a new home networking system known as HomeGroup; devices are added to the network with a password, and files and folders can be shared with all other devices in the HomeGroup, or with specific users. The default libraries, along with printers, are shared by default, but the personal folder is set to read-only access by other users, and the Public folder can be accessed by anyone.

Windows 7 includes improved globalization support through a new Extended Linguistic Services API to provide multilingual support (particularly in Ultimate and Enterprise editions). Microsoft also implemented better support for solid-state drives, including the new TRIM command, and Windows 7 is able to identify a solid-state drive uniquely. Native support for USB 3.0 is not included because of delays in the finalization of the standard. At WinHEC 2008 Microsoft announced that color depths of 30-bit and 48-bit would be supported in Windows 7 along with the wide color gamut scRGB (which for HDMI 1.3 can be converted and output as xvYCC). The video modes supported in Windows 7 are 16-bit sRGB, 24-bit sRGB, 30-bit sRGB, 30-bit with extended color gamut sRGB, and 48-bit scRGB.

For developers, Windows 7 includes a new networking API with support for building SOAP-based web services in native code (as opposed to .NET-based WCF web services), new features to simplify development of installation packages and shorten application install times. Windows 7, by default, generates fewer User Account Control (UAC) prompts because it allows digitally signed Windows components to gain elevated privileges without a prompt. Additionally, users can now adjust the level at which UAC operates using a sliding scale.

=== Removed ===
Certain capabilities and programs that were a part of Windows Vista are no longer present or have been changed, resulting in the removal of certain functionalities; these include the classic Start Menu user interface, some taskbar features, Windows Explorer features, Windows Media Player features, Windows Ultimate Extras, Search button, and InkBall. Four applications bundled with Windows Vista—Windows Photo Gallery, Windows Movie Maker, Windows Calendar and Windows Mail—are not included with Windows 7 and were replaced by Windows Live-branded versions as part of the Windows Live Essentials suite.

== Editions ==
Windows 7 is available in six different editions, of which the Home Premium, Professional, and Ultimate were available at retail in most countries, and as pre-loaded software on most new computers. Home Premium and Professional were aimed at home users and small businesses respectively, while Ultimate was aimed at enthusiasts. Each edition of Windows 7 includes all of the capabilities and features of the edition below it, and adds additional features oriented towards their market segments; for example, Professional adds additional networking and security features such as Encrypting File System and the ability to join a domain. Ultimate contained a superset of the features from Home Premium and Professional, along with other advanced features oriented towards power users, such as BitLocker drive encryption; unlike Windows Vista, there were no "Ultimate Extras" add-ons created for Windows 7 Ultimate. Retail copies were available in "upgrade" and higher-cost "full" version licenses; "upgrade" licenses require an existing version of Windows to install, while "full" licenses can be installed on computers with no existing operating system.

The remaining three editions were not available at retail, of which two were available exclusively through OEM channels as pre-loaded software. The Starter edition is a stripped-down version of Windows 7 meant for low-cost devices such as netbooks. In comparison to Home Premium, Starter has reduced multimedia functionality, does not allow users to change their desktop wallpaper or theme, disables the "Aero Glass" theme, does not have support for multiple monitors, and can only address 2GB of RAM. Home Basic was sold only in emerging markets, and was positioned in between Home Premium and Starter. The highest edition, Enterprise, is functionally similar to Ultimate, but is only sold through volume licensing via Microsoft's Software Assurance program.

All editions aside from Starter support both IA-32 and x86-64 architectures, Starter only supports 32-bit systems. Retail copies of Windows 7 are distributed on two DVDs: one for the IA-32 version and the other for x86-64. OEM copies include one DVD, depending on the processor architecture licensed. The installation media for consumer versions of Windows 7 are identical, the product key and corresponding license determines the edition that is installed. The Windows Anytime Upgrade service can be used to purchase an upgrade that unlocks the functionality of a higher edition, such as going from Starter to Home Premium, and Home Premium to Ultimate. Most copies of Windows 7 only contained one license; in certain markets, a "Family Pack" version of Windows 7 Home Premium was also released for a limited time, which allowed upgrades on up to three computers. In certain regions, copies of Windows 7 were only sold in, and could only be activated in a designated region.

== Support lifecycle ==
Support status summary
Expiration date
- Mainstream support: January 13, 2015
- Extended support: January 14, 2020

Applicable Windows 7 editions:
- Starter, Home Basic, Home Premium, Professional, Enterprise, and Ultimate, as well as Professional for Embedded Systems and Ultimate for Embedded Systems

Exceptions
- Professional and Enterprise volume licensed editions, as well as Professional for Embedded Systems: Extended Security Updates (ESU) support ended on January 10, 2023
- Windows Thin PC: Mainstream support ended on October 11, 2016; Extended support ended on October 12, 2021
- Windows Embedded Standard 7: Mainstream support ended on October 13, 2015; Extended support ended on October 13, 2020; Extended Security Updates (ESU) support ended on October 10, 2023
- Windows Embedded POSReady 7: Mainstream support ended on October 11, 2016; Extended support ended on October 12, 2021; Extended Security Updates (ESU) support ended on October 8, 2024

Support for the original release of Windows 7 (without a service pack) ended on April 9, 2013, requiring users to update to Windows 7 Service Pack 1 in order to continue receiving updates and support. Microsoft ended the sale of new retail copies of Windows 7 in October 2014, and the sale of new OEM licenses for Windows 7 Home Basic, Home Premium, and Ultimate ended on October 31, 2014. OEM sales of PCs with Windows 7 Professional pre-installed ended on October 31, 2016. The sale of non-Professional OEM licenses was stopped on October 31, 2014.

On January 13, 2015, Windows 7 exited mainstream support and entered the extended support phase; Microsoft continued to provide security updates every month for Windows 7, however, free technical support, warranty claims, and design changes were no longer being offered. Extended support for Windows 7 ended on January 14, 2020.

Variants of Windows 7 for embedded systems and thin clients have different support policies: Windows Embedded Standard 7 support ended in October 2020, but Windows Thin PC and Windows Embedded POSReady 7 had support until October 2021.

In March 2019, Microsoft announced that it would display notifications to users informing users of the upcoming end of support, and direct users to a website urging them to purchase a Windows 10 upgrade or a new computer.

In August 2019, researchers reported that "all modern versions of Microsoft Windows" may be at risk for "critical" system compromise because of design flaws of hardware device drivers from multiple providers. In the same month, computer experts reported that the BlueKeep security vulnerability, CVE-2019-0708, potentially affects older unpatched Microsoft Windows versions via the program's Remote Desktop Protocol, allowing for the possibility of remote code execution, may now include related flaws, collectively named DejaBlue, affecting newer Windows versions (i.e., Windows 7 and all recent versions) as well. In addition, experts reported a Microsoft security vulnerability, CVE-2019-1162, based on legacy code involving Microsoft CTF and ctfmon (ctfmon.exe), that affects all Windows versions from the older Windows XP version to the most recent Windows 10 versions; a patch to correct the flaw is currently available.

In September 2019, Microsoft announced that it would provide free security updates for Windows 7 on federally-certified voting machines through the 2020 United States elections.

=== Extended Security Updates ===
On September 7, 2018, Microsoft announced a paid "Extended Security Updates" (ESU) service that will offer additional updates for Windows 7 Professional and Enterprise for up to three years after the end of extended support, available via specific volume licensing programs in yearly installments.

Windows 7 Professional for Embedded Systems, Windows Embedded Standard 7, and Windows Embedded POSReady 7 also get Extended Security Updates for up to three years after their end of extended support date, via OEMs. The Extended Security Updates program for Windows Embedded POSReady 7 ended on October 8, 2024, marking the final end of IA-32 updates on the Windows NT 6.1 product line after more than 15 years.

In August 2019, Microsoft announced it would offer a year of 'free' extended security updates to some business users.

=== Third-party support ===
In January 2023, version 109 of the Chromium-based Microsoft Edge became the last version of Edge to support Windows 7, Windows Server 2008 R2, Windows 8/8.1, and Windows Server 2012/R2. Alongside this, several other web browsers based on the Chromium codebase also dropped support for these operating systems after version 109, including Google Chrome and Opera. A fork of Chromium named Supermium is maintained for versions of Windows older than Windows 10, including Windows 7.

Mozilla maintains Firefox 115 Extended Support Release (ESR) to support Windows 7, 8 and 8.1. Mozilla has committed to support it until at least March 2027. This date was originally September 2024, and has been continually extended after re-evaluations by Mozilla.

Steam ended support for Windows 7, 8, and 8.1 on January 1, 2024.

== System requirements ==
Minimum hardware requirements for Windows 7
Component	Operating system architecture	
Component	32-bit	64-bit
Processor	1 GHz IA-32 processor Support for SSE2 required after March 2018 cumulative update	1 GHz x86-64 processor
Memory (RAM)	1 GB	2 GB
Graphics card	DirectX 9 graphics processor with WDDM driver model 1.0	
Storage space	16 GB	20 GB
Installation media	DVD drive or USB drive	

Additional requirements to use certain features:

- Windows XP Mode (Professional, Ultimate and Enterprise): Requires an additional 1 GB of RAM and additional 15 GB of available hard disk space. As of 18 March 2010, the requirement for a processor capable of hardware virtualization has been lifted.
- Windows Media Center (included in Home Premium, Professional, Ultimate and Enterprise), requires a TV tuner to receive and record TV.

=== Physical memory ===
The maximum amount of RAM that Windows 7 supports varies depending on the product edition and on the processor architecture, as shown in the following table.

Physical memory limits of Windows 7
Edition	Processor architecture	
Edition	IA-32 (32-bit)	x64 (64-bit)
Ultimate	4 GB	192 GB
Enterprise	4 GB	192 GB
Professional	4 GB	192 GB
Home Premium	4 GB	16 GB
Home Basic	4 GB	8 GB
Starter	2 GB	—N/a

=== Processor limits ===
Maximum number of physical processors that Windows 7 supports is: 1 for Starter, Home Basic, and Home Premium; and 2 for Professional, Enterprise, and Ultimate.

Maximum number of logical processors (Note: A logical processor is either: One of the cores on one of the physical processors without SMT; or one of the two threads handled by one of the cores on one of the physical processors with SMT.) that Windows 7 supports is: 32 for 32-bit (x86-32) and 256 for 64-bit (x86-64).

== Extent of hardware support ==
In January 2016, Microsoft announced that it would no longer support Windows platforms older than Windows 10 on any future Intel-compatible processor lines, citing difficulties in reliably allowing the operating system to operate on newer hardware. Microsoft stated that effective July 17, 2017, devices with Intel Skylake CPUs were only to receive the "most critical" updates for Windows 7 and 8.1, and only if they have been judged not to affect the reliability of Windows 7 on older hardware. This would be until July 31, 2019, as August 2019 critical update requires at least Windows 10. For enterprise customers, Microsoft issued a list of Skylake-based devices "certified" for Windows 7 and 8.1 in addition to Windows 10, to assist them in migrating to newer hardware that can eventually be upgraded to 10 once they are ready to transition. Microsoft and their hardware partners provide special testing and support for these devices on 7 and 8.1 until the July 2017 date.

On March 18, 2016, in response to criticism from enterprise customers, Microsoft delayed the end of support and non-critical updates for Skylake systems to July 17, 2018, but stated that they would also continue to receive security updates through the end of extended support. In August 2016, citing a "strong partnership with our OEM partners and Intel", Microsoft retracted the decision and stated that it would continue to support Windows 7 and 8.1 on Skylake hardware through the end of their extended support lifecycle. However, the restrictions on newer CPU microarchitectures remain in force.

In March 2017, a Microsoft knowledge base article announced which implies that devices using Intel Kaby Lake, AMD Bristol Ridge, or AMD Ryzen, would be blocked from using Windows Update entirely. In addition, official Windows 7 device drivers are not available for the Kaby Lake and Ryzen platforms.

Security updates released since March 2018 contained bugs that affect processors that do not support SSE2 extensions, including all Pentium III, Athlon XP, and prior processors. Microsoft initially stated that it would attempt to resolve this issue, and prevented installation of the affected patches on these systems. However, Microsoft retroactively modified its support documents on June 15, 2018 to remove the promise that this bug would be resolved, replacing it with a statement suggesting that users obtain a newer processor. This effectively ends further patch support for Windows 7 on these older systems.

== Updates ==
=== Service Pack 1 ===
Windows 7 Service Pack 1 (SP1) was announced on March 18, 2010. A beta was released on July 12, 2010. The final version was released to the public on February 22, 2011. At the time of release, it was not made mandatory. It was available via Windows Update, direct download, or by ordering the Windows 7 SP1 DVD. The service pack is on a much smaller scale than those released for previous versions of Windows, particularly Windows Vista.

Windows 7 Service Pack 1 adds support for Advanced Vector Extensions (AVX), a 256-bit instruction set extension for processors, and improves IKEv2 by adding additional identification fields such as E-mail ID to it. In addition, it adds support for Advanced Format 512e as well as additional Identity Federation Services. Windows 7 Service Pack 1 also resolves a bug related to HDMI audio and another related to printing XPS documents.

In Europe, the automatic nature of the BrowserChoice.eu feature was dropped in Windows 7 Service Pack 1 in February 2011 and remained absent for 14 months despite Microsoft reporting that it was still present, subsequently described by Microsoft as a "technical error." As a result, in March 2013, the European Commission fined Microsoft €561 million to deter companies from reneging on settlement promises.

=== Platform Update ===
The Platform Update for Windows 7 SP1 and Windows Server 2008 R2 SP1 was released on February 26, 2013 after a pre-release version had been released on November 5, 2012. It is also included with Internet Explorer 10 for Windows 7.

It includes enhancements to Direct2D, DirectWrite, Direct3D, Windows Imaging Component (WIC), Windows Advanced Rasterization Platform (WARP), Windows Animation Manager (WAM), XPS Document API, H.264 Video Decoder and JPEG XR decoder. However support for Direct3D 11.1 is limited as the update does not include DXGI/WDDM 1.2 from Windows 8, making unavailable many related APIs and significant features such as stereoscopic frame buffer, feature level 11_1 and optional features for levels 10_0, 10_1 and 11_0.

=== Disk Cleanup update ===
In October 2013, a Disk Cleanup Wizard addon was released that lets users delete outdated Windows updates on Windows 7 SP1, thus reducing the size of the WinSxS directory. This update backports some features found in Windows 8.

=== Windows Management Framework 5.0 ===
Windows Management Framework 5.0 includes updates to Windows PowerShell 5.0, Windows PowerShell Desired State Configuration (DSC), Windows Remote Management (WinRM), Windows Management Instrumentation (WMI). It was released on February 24, 2016 and was eventually superseded by Windows Management Framework 5.1.

=== Convenience rollup ===
In May 2016, Microsoft released a "Convenience rollup update for Windows 7 SP1 and Windows Server 2008 R2 SP1," which contains all patches released between the release of SP1 and April 2016. The rollup is not available via Windows Update, and must be downloaded manually. This package can also be integrated into a Windows 7 installation image.

Since October 2016, all security and reliability updates are cumulative. Downloading and installing updates that address individual problems is no longer possible, but the number of updates that must be downloaded to fully update the OS is significantly reduced.

=== Monthly update rollups (July 2016 – January 2020) ===
In June 2018, Microsoft announced that Windows 7 would be moved to a monthly update model beginning with updates released in September 2018, two years after Microsoft switched the rest of their supported operating systems to that model. With the new update model, instead of updates being released as they became available, only two update packages were released on the second Tuesday of every month until Windows 7 reached its end of life—one package containing security and quality updates, and a smaller package that contained only the security updates. Users could choose which package they wanted to install each month. Later in the month, another package would be released which was a preview of the next month's security and quality update rollup.

Microsoft announced in July 2019 that the Microsoft Internet Games services on Windows XP and Windows Me would end on July 31, 2019 (and for Windows 7 on January 22, 2020).

The last free security update rollup packages were released on January 14, 2020.

=== End of support (after January 14, 2020) ===
On January 14, 2020, Windows 7 support ended with Microsoft no longer providing security updates or fixes after that date, except for subscribers of the Windows 7 Extended Security Updates (ESU), who were able to receive Windows 7 security updates through January 10, 2023. However, there have been two updates that have been issued to non-ESU subscribers:

- In February 2020, Microsoft released an update via Windows Update to fix a black wallpaper issue caused by the January 2020 update for Windows 7.
- In June 2020, Microsoft released an update via Windows Update to roll out the new Chromium-based Microsoft Edge to Windows 7 and 8.1 machines that are not connected to Active Directory. Users, e.g. those on Active Directory, can download Edge from Microsoft's website.

In a support document, Microsoft has stated that a full-screen upgrade warning notification would be displayed on Windows 7 PCs on all editions except the Enterprise edition after January 15, 2020. The notification does not appear on machines connected to Active Directory, machines in kiosk mode, or machines subscribed for Extended Security Updates.

=== ESU rollups ===
As part of the September 2022 Extended Security Updates (ESU) rollup, Microsoft quietly added in Secure Boot support, along with partial UEFI support.

== Reception ==
=== Critical reception ===
Windows 7 received very positive reviews, with critics noting the increased usability and functionality when compared with its predecessor, Windows Vista. CNET gave Windows 7 Home Premium a rating of 4.5 out of 5 stars, stating that it "is more than what Vista should have been, [and] it's where Microsoft needed to go". PC Magazine rated it a 4 out of 5 saying that Windows 7 is a "big improvement" over Windows Vista, with fewer compatibility problems, a retooled taskbar, simpler home networking and faster start-up. Maximum PC gave Windows 7 a rating of 9 out of 10 and called Windows 7 a "massive leap forward" in usability and security, and praised the new Taskbar as "worth the price of admission alone." PC World called Windows 7 a "worthy successor" to Windows XP and said that speed benchmarks showed Windows 7 to be slightly faster than Windows Vista. PC World also named Windows 7 one of the best products of the year.

In its review of Windows 7, Engadget said that Microsoft had taken a "strong step forward" with Windows 7 and reported that speed is one of Windows 7's major selling points—particularly for the netbook sets. Laptop Magazine gave Windows 7 a rating of 4 out of 5 stars and said that Windows 7 makes computing more intuitive, offered better overall performance including a "modest to dramatic" increase in battery life on laptop computers. TechRadar gave Windows 7 a rating of 5 out of 5 stars, concluding that "it combines the security and architectural improvements of Windows Vista with better performance than XP can deliver on today's hardware. No version of Windows is ever perfect, but Windows 7 really is the best release of Windows yet." USA Today and The Telegraph also gave Windows 7 favorable reviews.

Nick Wingfield of The Wall Street Journal wrote, "Visually arresting," and "A pleasure." Mary Branscombe of Financial Times wrote, "A clear leap forward." Jesus Diaz of Gizmodo wrote, "Windows 7 Kills Snow Leopard." Don Reisinger of CNET wrote, "Delightful." David Pogue of The New York Times wrote, "Faster." J. Peter Bruzzese and Richi Jennings of Computerworld wrote, "Ready."

Some Windows Vista Ultimate users have expressed concerns over Windows 7 pricing and upgrade options. Windows Vista Ultimate users wanting to upgrade from Windows Vista to Windows 7 had to either pay $219.99 to upgrade to Windows 7 Ultimate or perform a clean install, which requires them to reinstall all of their programs.

The changes to User Account Control on Windows 7 were criticized for being potentially insecure, as an exploit was discovered allowing untrusted software to be launched with elevated privileges by exploiting a trusted component. Peter Bright of Ars Technica argued that "the way that the Windows 7 UAC 'improvements' have been made completely exempts Microsoft's developers from having to do that work themselves. With Windows 7, it's one rule for Redmond, another one for everyone else." Microsoft's Windows kernel engineer Mark Russinovich acknowledged the problem, but noted that malware can also compromise a system when users agree to a prompt.

=== Sales ===
In July 2009, in only eight hours, pre-orders of Windows 7 at amazon.co.uk surpassed the demand which Windows Vista had in its first 17 weeks. It became the highest-grossing pre-order in Amazon's history, surpassing sales of the previous record holder, the seventh Harry Potter book. After 36 hours, 64-bit versions of Windows 7 Professional and Ultimate editions sold out in Japan. Two weeks after its release its market share had surpassed that of Snow Leopard, released two months previously as the most recent update to Apple's Mac OS X operating system. According to Net Applications, Windows 7 reached a 4% market share in less than three weeks; in comparison, it took Windows Vista seven months to reach the same mark. As of February 2014, Windows 7 had a market share of 47.49% according to Net Applications; in comparison, Windows XP had a market share of 29.23%.

On March 4, 2010, Microsoft announced that it had sold more than 90 million licenses. By April 23, 2010, more than 100 million copies were sold in six months, which made it Microsoft's fastest-selling operating system. As of 24 June 2010, Windows 7 has sold 150 million copies which made it the fastest selling operating system in history with seven copies sold every second. Based on worldwide data taken during June 2010 from Windows Update 46% of Windows 7 PCs run the 64-bit edition of Windows 7. According to Stephen Baker of the NPD Group during April 2010 in the United States 77% of PCs sold at retail were pre-installed with the 64-bit edition of Windows 7. As of 22 July 2010, Windows 7 had sold 175 million copies. On October 21, 2010, Microsoft announced that more than 240 million copies of Windows 7 had been sold. Three months later, on January 27, 2011, Microsoft announced total sales of 300 million copies of Windows 7. On July 12, 2011, the sales figure was refined to over 400 million end-user licenses and business installations. As of 9 July 2012, over 630 million licenses have been sold; this number includes licenses sold to OEMs for new PCs.

=== Antitrust concerns ===
As with other Microsoft operating systems, Windows 7 was studied by United States federal regulators who oversee the company's operations following the 2001 United States v. Microsoft Corp. settlement. According to status reports filed, the three-member panel began assessing prototypes of the new operating system in February 2008. Michael Gartenberg, an analyst at Jupiter Research, said, "[Microsoft's] challenge for Windows 7 will be how can they continue to add features that consumers will want that also don't run afoul of regulators."

In order to comply with European antitrust regulations, Microsoft proposed the use of a "ballot" screen containing download links to competing web browsers, thus removing the need for a version of Windows completely without Internet Explorer, as previously planned. Microsoft announced that it would discard the separate version for Europe and ship the standard upgrade and full packages worldwide, in response to criticism involving Windows 7 E and concerns from manufacturers about possible consumer confusion if a version of Windows 7 with Internet Explorer were shipped later, after one without Internet Explorer.

As with the previous version of Windows, an N version, which does not come with Windows Media Player, has been released in Europe, but only for sale directly from Microsoft sales websites and selected others.

== See also ==
- BlueKeep, a security vulnerability discovered in May 2019 that affected most Windows NT–based computers up to Windows 7

== Notes ==
Preceded by Windows Vista	Windows 7; 2009	Succeeded by Windows 8
