= Microsoft Solitaire =

Card game that is included in Microsoft Windows

Solitaire

- Solitaire in Windows 7
- Original author: Wes Cherry
- Developer: Microsoft
- Release: May 22, 1990; 36 years ago
- Operating system: Microsoft Windows
- Platform: IA-32, x86-64 (and historically DEC Alpha, Itanium, MIPS, and PowerPC)
- Successor: Microsoft Solitaire Collection (Windows 10)

Solitaire is a computer game included with Microsoft Windows, based on a card game of the same name, also known as Klondike. Its original version was programmed by Wes Cherry, and the cards were designed by Susan Kare. It has been called the most prolific PC game of all time due to its inclusion in Windows.

== History ==
Game of "Klondike" on Microsoft Solitaire Collection in Windows 10. This edition includes four other solitaire games: tripeaks, spider, freecell, and pyramid.

Microsoft has included the game as part of its Windows product line since Windows 3.0, starting from 1990. The game was developed during the summer of 1988 by the intern Wes Cherry. The card deck itself was designed by Macintosh pioneer Susan Kare. Cherry's version was to include a boss key that would have switched the game to a fake Microsoft Excel spreadsheet, but he was asked to remove this from the final release.

Microsoft intended Solitaire "to soothe people intimidated by the operating system," and at a time when many users were still unfamiliar with graphical user interfaces, it proved useful in familiarizing them with the use of a mouse, such as the drag-and-drop technique required for moving cards.

According to Microsoft telemetry, Solitaire was among the three most-used Windows programs and FreeCell was seventh, ahead of Word and Microsoft Excel. Lost business productivity by employees playing Solitaire was a common concern in 1998 since it became standard on Microsoft Windows. In 2006, a New York City worker was fired after Mayor Michael Bloomberg saw the Solitaire game on the man's office computer.

In October 2012, along with the release of the Windows 8 operating system, Microsoft released a new version of Solitaire called Microsoft Solitaire Collection. This version, game designed by Microsoft Studios, with visual design led by William Bredbeck, and developed by Arkadium, is advertisement supported and introduced many new features to the game. As with the original release of the game, William Bredbeck is quoted as saying "One of the intentions of the redesign was to introduce users to the novel changes incorporated in the new Windows 8 operating system". This design is still in use through Windows 11.

Microsoft Solitaire celebrated its 25th anniversary on May 18, 2015 with a tournament broadcast on the Microsoft campus and broadcast the main event on Twitch.

In 2019, The Strong National Museum of Play inducted Microsoft Solitaire to its World Video Game Hall of Fame.

By its 30th anniversary in 2020, it was estimated that the game still had 35 million active monthly players and more than 100 million games played daily, according to Microsoft.

== Features ==
When a game is won, the cards fall off each stack and bounce on the screen. This "victory" screen is considered a prototypical element that would become popular in casual games, compared to the use of "Ode to Joy" on winning a level of Peggle, and makes Solitaire one of the first such games.

Since Windows 3.0, Solitaire allows selecting the design on the back of the cards, choosing whether one or three cards are drawn from the deck at a time, switching between Vegas scoring and Standard scoring, and disabling scoring entirely. The game can also be timed for additional points if the game is won. There is a cheat that will allow drawing one card at a time when 'draw three' is set.

In Windows 2000 and later, right-clicking on an open space moves all available cards to the foundations, while right-clicking on a specific card moves only that card if possible. Left double-clicking also moves a card to its foundation.

Until the Windows XP version, the card backs were the original works designed by Susan Kare, and many were animated.

The Windows Vista and Windows 7 versions of the game save statistics on the number and percentage of games won, and allow users to save incomplete games and to choose cards with different face styles.

On Windows 8, Windows 10, Windows 11, Windows Phone, Android and iOS, the game is issued as Microsoft Solitaire Collection, where in addition to Klondike four other game modes were featured, Spider, FreeCell (both of which had been previously featured in versions of Windows as Microsoft Spider Solitaire and Microsoft FreeCell), Pyramid, and TriPeaks (both of which were previously part of the Microsoft Entertainment Pack series, the former under the name Tut's Tomb).

== See also ==
- List of games included with Windows
