= List of SAM Coupé games =

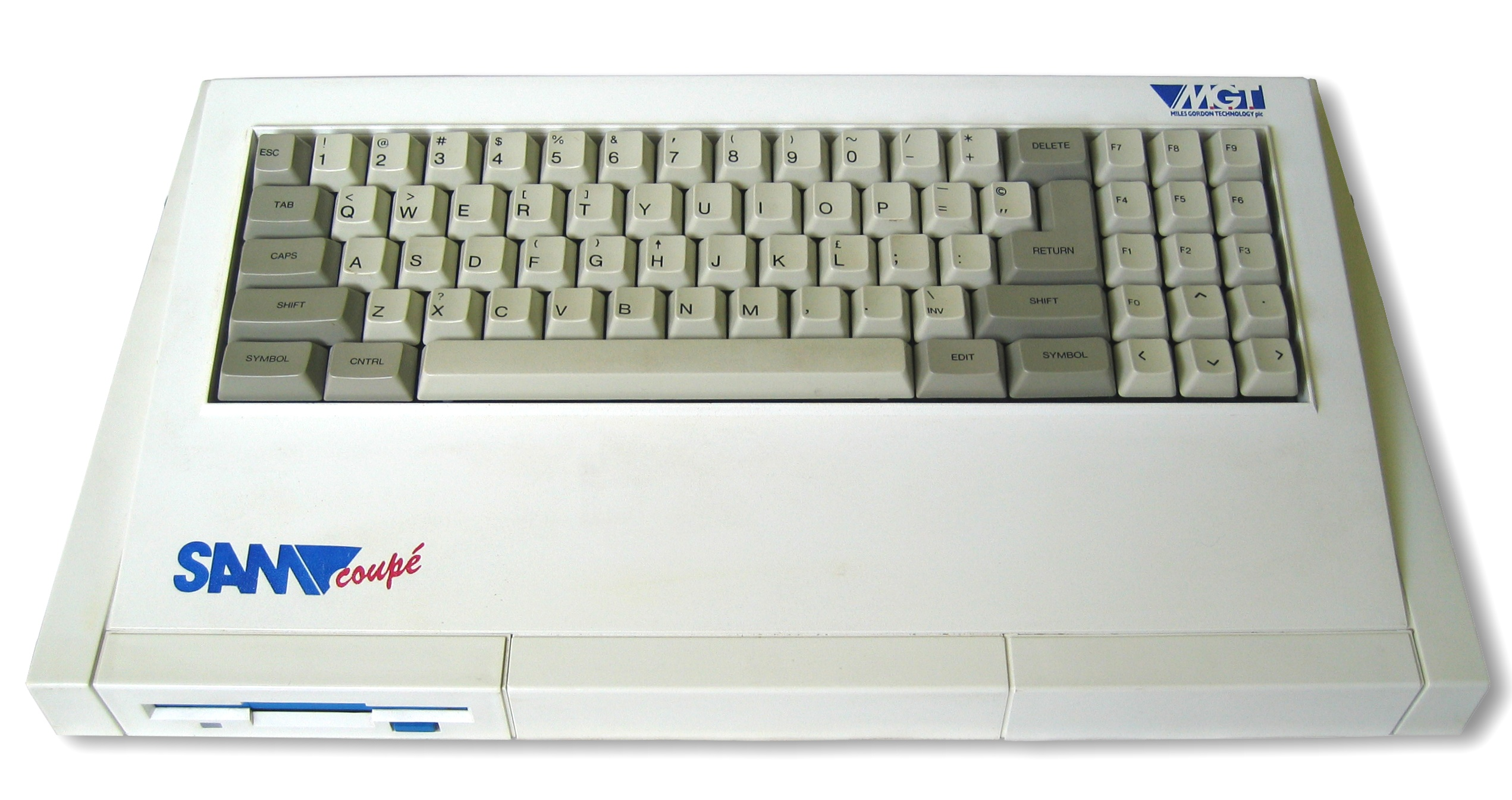
SAM Coupé

The SAM Coupé is a British 8-bit home computer manufactured by Miles Gordon Technology (MGT) and released in 1989. Games released for the computer include the following.

== Commercial ==
There are 78 games on this list.

Title	Year	Publisher	Reference
Amalthea	1995	Jupiter Software / Phoenix Software Systems	
Astroball	1992	Revelation	
Batz'n'Balls	1992	Revelation / Persona	
Blokker	1995	Mungus Software	
Boing!	1992	Noesis Software / FRED Publishing	
Booty	1995	Phoenix Software Systems / Persona	
Bowin and the Count Dracula	1991	Persona	
Burglar Bob	1996	Jupiter Software	
Castle	1991	Jupiter Software	
Chess Mate	1996	Quazar / Jupiter Software	
Colony	1996	FRED Publishing	
Conquest	1997	Zeddsoft	
Craft	1992	Phoenix Software Systems / Persona	
Day Dream eggbar man	1992	Eureka Software	
Days of Sorcery	1992	Nigel Kettlewell	
Defender	1998	Persona	
Defenders of the Earth	1990	Enigma Variations	
Delta Charge	1990	Thalamus	
Domino Box	1997	Supplement Software	
Double Top	1993	Supplement Software	
Dragon Tiles	1990	Format Publications	
Drop Out	1992	Supplement Software	
Dyadic	1993	Phoenix Software Systems / Persona	
Dyzonium	1992	FRED Publishing	
Elite	1996	Revelation	
Escape from the Planet of the Robot Monsters	1989	Enigma Variations	
Exodus	1993	Apex Developments	
Football Director II	1992	D + H Games	
Football League Manager	1992	FRED Publishing	
Grubbing For Gold	1995	Revelation	
Have You Lost Your Marbles Deluxe	1995	Phoenix Software Systems	
Hexagonia	1991	Revelation / Persona	
Ice Chicken	1995	Persona / Phoenix Software Systems	
Impatience (The Viking Game)	1991	FRED Publishing	
IMPostors!	1996	Mungus Software	
Klax	1990	Enigma Variations	
Legend Of Eshan	1994	Revelation / FRED Publishing	
Lemmings	1993	FRED Publishing	
Little Genius	1992	Revelation	
Lovehearts	?	Supplement Software	
Manic Miner	1992	Revelation / Phoenix Software Systems / Persona	
Mind Games 1	1990	Enigma Variations	
Mind Games 2	?	Enigma Variations	
Momentum	1996	FRED Publishing	
Money Bags	1996	Quazar	
Money Bags 2	?	Quazar	
Oh No! More Lemmings	1994	FRED Publishing	
Parallax	1992	FRED Publishing	
Pazook	1992	Supplement Software	
Pipe Mania	1990	Enigma Variations	
Prince of Persia	1990	Revelation	
Quizball	1991	Revelation	
SAM MegaDisk 1	1991	Vertex Software	
Sam Multipack 1 (Future Ball, SAM Strikes Out!)	1993	FRED Publishing	
Sam'X	?	Supplement Software	
Shanghai (Supplement Software)	1997	Supplement Software	
Shapes	?	Supplement Software	
Sheriff Gunn	1992	Axxent Software	
Snake Mania	1992	Phoenix Software Systems	
Snare	1992	Beyond Belief	
Sophistry	1994	Revelation	
Sphera	1990	Enigma Variations	
Splat!	1991	Revelation	
Stratosphere	?	Quazar	
Super Byke Championship	1995	Quazar	
T 'n' T	1994	Revelation	
The Bulgulators	1992	FRED Publishing	
The Famous Five 1: Five on a Treasure Island	1990	Enigma Variations	
The Golden Sword of Bhakhor	1991	Persona	
The Witching Hour	1993	FRED Publishing	
Triltex	1992	FRED Publishing	
True Faith	?	Elyzium Software	
Vegetable Vacation	1992	Revelation	
Void	1991	Revelation	
WaterWorks	1993	FRED Publishing	
WaterWorks 2	1994	FRED Publishing	
Wop Gamma	1993	FRED Publishing	
X-Sights 3	1996	Saturn Software	

== Public Domain / Homebrew ==
Title	Year	Reference
BattleZone	2021	
BeetleMania	1992	
Boxes	1992	
BS Sound 1	1992	
Bubble Ghost	2021	
Captain Comic	1988	
Coloris	1990	
Dave Infuriators	2005	
Dave Invaders	2005	
EGGBuM	1995	
Epic Fail	2005	
Explode	1990	
Gemstones	1990	
The Ghosts of Blackwood Manor	2023	
Invasion II	2001	
Magic Caves 2002	2001	
Moby DX	2005	
Money Bags 1½	?	
Pang	2005	
Rick Dangerous	2021	
Sam Cards	1994	
Sam Solitaire	2000	
SamMines	1995	
Shanghai	1990	
Soccer Boss	1990	
Soul Magician	1992	
Street Fighter 1	2017	
Supa-Toob	?	
Syncytium	1994	
Tetris	1990	
The Garden Centre of the Universe	2005	
The Lost Tomb of Ananka	?	
The Occult Connection	1993	
The Sad Snail Collection	1998	
Wubtris	2005	

== Unreleased ==
Title	Year	Reference
F-16 Combat Pilot	1991	
Kaboom	?	
