= Datel =

British video game accessories manufacturer; makers of Action Replay

- Type: Private
- Industry: Video games
- Genre: Third-party video game accessories
- Founded: 1980; 46 years ago (as Datel Electronics)
- Headquarters: Stone, Staffordshire, England, U.K.
- Key people: Mike Connors
- Products: Video game cheating devices Trainers
- Brands: Action Replay
- Website: www.datel.co.uk

Datel (/ˈdeɪtɛl/ DAY-tel; previously Datel Electronics) is a UK-based electronics and game console peripherals manufacturer. As of 2025, Datel Electronics Limited is an active company registered in the United Kingdom, continuing to develop and manufacture video game peripherals and enhancement products. The company is best known for producing a wide range of hardware and peripherals for home computers in the 1980s, for example replacement keyboards for the ZX Spectrum, the PlusD disk interface (originally designed and sold by Miles Gordon Technology) and the Action Replay series of video game cheating devices.

Datel was founded by Mike Connors, who still runs the company and was featured in the Sunday Times Rich List as one of the UK's top thousand richest people.

== History ==
=== 1980s ===
Datel started off selling AM CB radio transceivers in the UK. These AM-band radios were made illegal in the UK and even the importing of them was deemed illegal until 1981. Datel then started to import the CB radios in component form and build them up.

The company started to manufacture products related to home computers that were popular in the 1980s such as the Commodore 64, Amstrad CPC and ZX Spectrum. Such devices included light pens and memory expansion. One of their first commercial successes was joystick interfaces for the ZX Spectrum.

The greatest commercial success of Datel was the Action Replay, first for the Commodore 64 and then the Amiga. The Commodore 64 version was designed by Richard Bond, with six versions ultimately developed in all. The Amiga version was authored by two German students, Olaf Boehm and Joerg Zanger, who had been inspired by the Commodore 64 version.

The Commodore 64 and Amiga Action Replays included the ability to save the entire contents of a home computer's memory to floppy disk or compact audio cassette, and then to reload very quickly. This proved very popular with people, especially when the Commodore 64 could take 20 minutes to load a game from notoriously unreliable tape. It also did not escape people's attention that they could use Action Replays to copy games. The name Action Replay referred to the fact that could instantly restart a game from the position that had saved it. The OCP Art Studio painting software was also successful, in part due to the bundled mouse, which was a novelty on 8-bit systems.

Another feature the Amiga and Commodore 64 versions had in common was the ability to add POKEs, or cheats. They also had a system for finding pokes called a Pokefinder, or a trainer.

=== 1990s ===
The rise of the IBM PC and the x86 standard to personal computer market dominance changed Datel's traditional PC clients' fortunes; Commodore International, maker of Amiga and Commodore 64 computers filed for bankruptcy in 1994, Sinclair was sold to Amstrad in a bid to save its market share, and Miles Gordon Technology, a ZX Spectrum aftermarket accessory manufacturer sold their PlusD drive to Datel to finance their struggling SAM Coupé project.

By the mid-1990s, desktop computers —until then the exclusive medium of 3D games— were giving way to a new generation of polygon-capable, CD-based home consoles. Datel took the Pokes and Pokefinder features of the earlier Action Replays and created Action Replay for the Sega Mega Drive. This was followed shortly after by the Action Replay Pro, which used a superior system sometimes referred to as RAM stuffing. This, combined with a built-in Trainer, allowed users to easily find their own codes.

The Action Replay was in competition for some time with Codemasters' Game Genie, which was distributed by Galoob. At first, Codemasters tried to protect the Game Genie as they had filed a patent on cartridge cheat devices. Datel defended this by saying that they had been cheating at games since long before the Game Genie existed. Action Replay improved on the Game Genie's functionality by adding an enable/disable switch. The cheat codes, at the time, were published in a more logical hexadecimal format compared with Codemasters' obfuscated system. This meant that users, along with the trainer, could make their own cheat codes.

Ultimately Codemasters and Galoob dropped the Game Genie entirely leaving Datel as the only cheat device manufacturer in the world.

Datel initially struggled to maintain a presence in the North American market, but in late 1995 they signed a deal with InterAct Accessories. InterAct acquired the rights to production and distribution of Datel's new cheat devices for the Sega Saturn and Sony PlayStation in North America, allowing Datel's products to reach the major retail chains for the first time.

=== 2000s ===
After numerous unsuccessful attempts at breaking into the sizable US market, Datel found an American partner, InterAct Accessories that was willing to distribute their products under a new name, GameShark. InterAct Accessories made cheat devices for most major consoles from the third through seventh generations. The GameShark's success helped InterAct dominate the video game accessory market with 70 percent share, the most successful being the ones for the Game Boy, and the PlayStation 1 and 2.

When InterAct's parent company, Recoton was going through financial difficulties, it decided to discontinue the GameShark name and website by the end of September 2002. In January 2003 Mad Catz acquired the GameShark brand for $5 million after Recoton went bankrupt. As a result, Datel started selling Action Replay products directly to the North American market.

In 2003, Datel released the Advance Game Port as an alternative to the Game Boy Player. In 2004, Datel released MaxPlay Classic Games Volume 1, a compilation of games for the GameCube, to negative reception.

In addition to the Max Media Dock line, Datel also makes hard drive add-ons and wireless adapters for PSP, Nintendo DS and Wii. There is an active homebrew community surrounding the Max Media Dock for Nintendo DS.

In 2008, the company released the Wii Freeloader, which allowed users to circumvent regional lockout on the Wii. However, it was rendered inoperable shortly thereafter on any Wii running firmware 3.3 or later, which targeted unauthorized modifications of the system.

In 2009 the TurboFire was released for the PS3. It has a modified design and offers turbo functions for the buttons. Unlike most aftermarket controllers the TurboFire uses Bluetooth and connects wirelessly to the PS3 without the need for an adapter.

Datel operated the TV station Max TV, on Sky Digital, Channel 675 until its closure in 2010.

== Legal issues ==
In the 1990s, Sony filed a lawsuit in California court against Datel Electronics and Interact Accessories. Datel had allegedly logged on using Interact Accessories' Sony developer user name and password and accessed official developer software from an IP that resolved to datel.co.uk. The case was settled out of court.

In early 2009, Sony filed a suit against Datel for its Lite Blue Tool. The product was a sequel to the Datel Tool battery, which acted like a Pandora battery which caused a Sony PlayStation Portable (PSP) to enter into Jigkick or Factory programming mode, allowing the execution of the boot code from a removable storage. The Lite Blue Tool compensated for the fact that the new factory mode was encrypted. Datel withdrew this product shortly after action was announced.

On 20 November 2009, Datel filed a legal complaint against Microsoft in the Northern District of California for violations of §§1–2 of the Sherman Antitrust Act and §3 of the Clayton Antitrust Act; for unfair competition; and for tortious interference with prospective economic advantage. In response, Microsoft has filed patent infringement suits over the styling of their wildfire controllers.

In 2012, Sony took Datel to court, claiming that the Action Replay cheat software sold by Datel infringed its copyright. The claim was dismissed by the European Court of Justice on 17 October 2024, due to the fact that the cheats didn't infringe on the code's IP protections.
