= Format Publications =

Computer magazine publisher

Format Publications published Format magazine, a newsletter for ZX Spectrum and SAM Coupé users.

Run by Bob Brenchley, it sprang from the ashes of INDUG, originally the Independent DISCiPLE User Group but later renamed to the Independent User Group to reflect a move towards a less specialist audience. INDUG was set up as a user group for owners of the Miles Gordon Technology DISCiPLE and later PlusD floppy disk interfaces for the ZX Spectrum computer. In its later years it expanded to cover MGT's SAM Coupé enhanced Spectrum-compatible microcomputer and later still to home microcomputing in general - especially 8-bit machines.

Format publications, under the guise of West Coast Computers, rescued the SAM Coupé in 1992 to continue production. West Coast went into liquidation in 2005.
