= DISCiPLE =

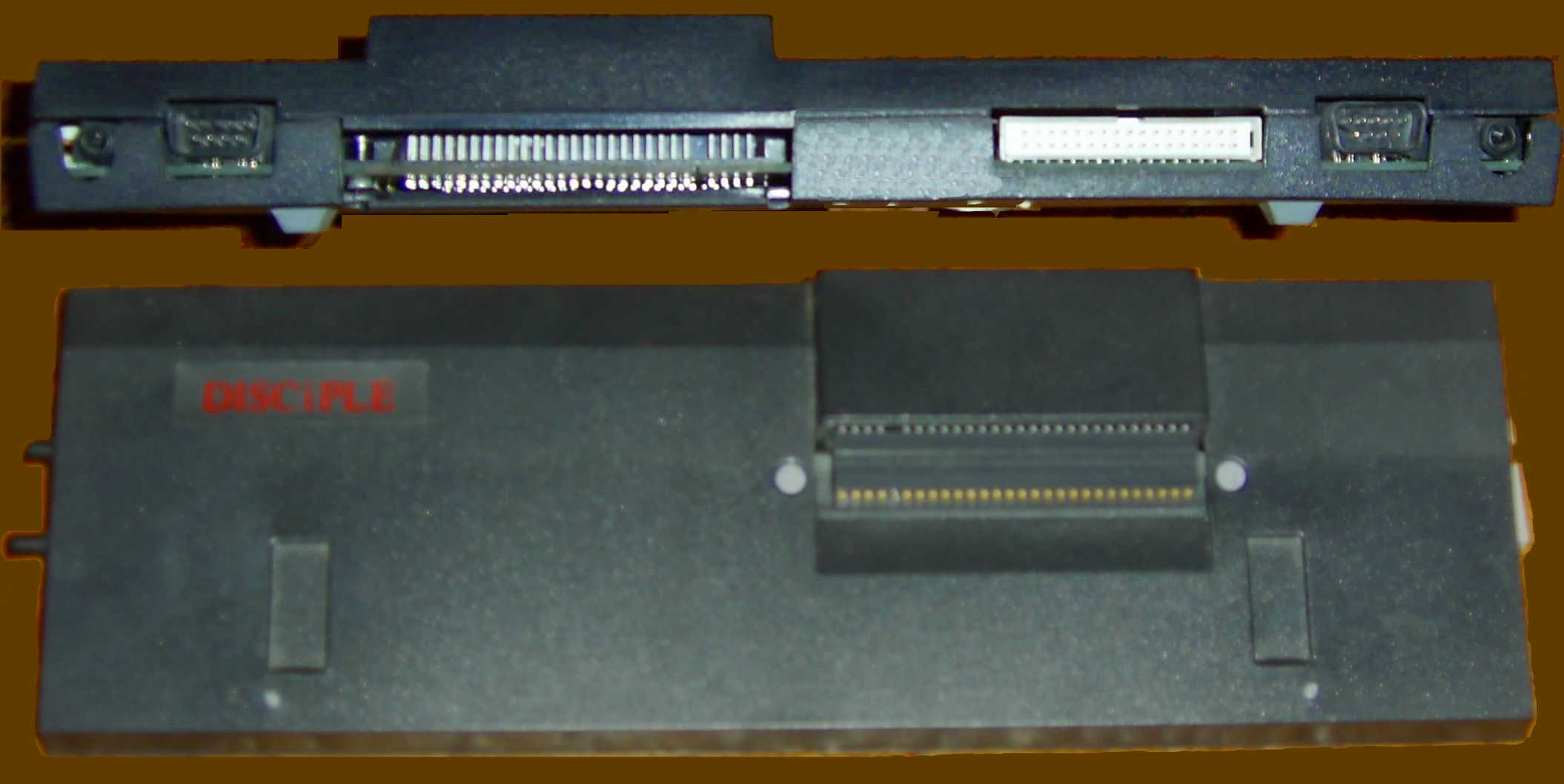
- Interface DISCiPLE, back and top view
- Introduced: 1986
- Memory: 8kB
- Read-only memory: 8kB
- Ports: Parallel port, Shugart bus, Atari joystick port, 3.5mm Phone connector (audio) ZX Interface 1 computer network connector
- Color: Black

The DISCiPLE is a floppy disk interface for the ZX Spectrum home computer. Designed by Miles Gordon Technology, it was marketed by Rockfort Products and launched in 1986.

Like Sinclair's own ZX Interface 1, the DISCiPLE was a wedge-shaped unit fitting underneath the Spectrum. It was designed as a super-interface, providing all the facilities a Spectrum owner could need. In addition to floppy-disk, parallel port printer interface and a "magic button" (see Non-maskable interrupt), it also offered twin joystick ports, Sinclair ZX Net-compatible network ports and an inhibit button for disabling the device.

At the rear of the unit was a pass-through port for connecting further devices, although the complexity of the DISCiPLE meant that many would not work, or only if the DISCiPLE was "turned off" using the inhibit button.

The DISCiPLE was a considerable success but its sophistication (the device included 8kB of ROM) meant that it was expensive and the plastic casing, located beneath the computer itself, was sometimes prone to overheating. These factors led to the development of MGT's later +D interface.

The DISCiPLE's DOS was named GDOS. MGT's later DOSs (G+DOS for the +D, and SAM DOS for the SAM Coupé) were backwards-compatible with GDOS. In later years a complete new system called UNI-DOS was developed by SD Software for the DISCiPLE and +D interfaces. In October 1993 "The Complete DISCiPLE Disassembly" was published in book form, documenting the "GDOS system 3d" version.

The popularity of the DISCiPLE led to the formation of a user group and magazine, INDUG, which later became Format Publications. Usergroups like INDUG/Format in the UK or DISCiPLE-Nieuwsbrief in the Netherlands produced enhancements such as extended printer support.

== See also ==
- Beta Disk Interface
