= Simple Simon =

Simple Simon may refer to:

- Simple Simon (1922 film), a British romance film
- Simple Simon (1935 film), a ComiColor Cartoons short film
- Simple Simon (2010 film), a Swedish film
- Simple Simon (musical), a 1930 Broadway musical
- Simple Simon (novel), a 1996 novel by Ryne Douglas Pearson
- "Simple Simon" (nursery rhyme), a nursery rhyme
- Simple Simon (solitaire), a solitaire/patience card game
- "Simple Simon" (song), a 1980 song by Australian rock band INXS
- Simple Simon under, a knot
- the children's game Simon Says, also known as "Simple Simon Says"
