= Miles Gordon Technology =

Logo

Miles Gordon Technology, known as MGT, was a small British company, initially specialising in high-quality add-ons for the ZX Spectrum home computer. It was founded in June 1986 in Cambridge, England by Alan Miles and Bruce Gordon, former employees of Sinclair Research, after Sinclair sold the rights for the Spectrum to Amstrad. They moved to Swansea, Wales, in May 1989, became a public company in July 1989 and went into receivership in June 1990.

== The DISCiPLE and +D ==
As the ZX Spectrum became hugely popular, the lack of a mass storage system became a problem for more serious users. While Sinclair's response, the ZX Interface 1 and ZX Microdrive, was very cheap and technologically innovative, it was also rather limited. Many companies developed interfaces to connect floppy disk drives to the ZX Spectrum, one of the most successful being the Opus Discovery; however, these were all to some degree incompatible with Sinclair's system.

MGT's approach was different. It produced two different floppy-disk interfaces for the Spectrum, first the DISCiPLE (marketed by Rockfort Products) and later the cut-down +D interface (marketed by MGT themselves). Both, however, shared certain features:

- A Shugart-compatible port for connecting one or two floppy diskette drives (the de facto standard created by Shugart Associates)
- A parallel printer port
- A "magic button"

The latter generated a non-maskable interrupt, freezing any software running on the Spectrum and allowing it to be saved to disk. This made it simple to store tape-based games on disk, to take screenshots and to enter cheat codes. A duplicate expansion connector at the back allowed other peripherals to be daisy chained, although the complexity of the DISCiPLE meant that many would not work correctly.

However, the real innovation was in the ROM. Unlike most of the competing systems, this was compatible with the Sinclair's extended ROM, meaning that the same BASIC commands used to operate Microdrives or the ZX Printer now could control floppy disk drives or a standard parallel printer. As well as being BASIC-compatible, it also mimicked the machine code entry points in the ZX Interface 1 - the so-called "hook codes". This meant that any Microdrive-specific software could use floppy disk drives connected to MGT interfaces instead without modification, provided the hook codes were used. The floppy drives simply appeared to Microdrive-aware applications to be very big, fast Microdrives.

Sinclair's Microdrive command syntax was so complex that a selling point of many disk interfaces was that their commands were simpler. While loading from tape required a simple:

LOAD "progname"

the equivalent Microdrive syntax was:

LOAD *"m";1;"progname"

Given the complexity of entering punctuation on the Spectrum's tiny keyboard, this was cumbersome. In addition to supporting the Sinclair syntax, MGT's code reduced the command to:

LOAD d1"progname"

Later, MGT produced the Lifetime Drive range of floppy disk drives (later named Universal Drive after concerns about warranty expectations). The drive was advertised as being compatible with major systems on the market at the time and comprised four models (3.5" and 5.25", with and without their own power supplies). Compatibility with various machines was achieved using a DIP switch and computer-specific cables.

== The SAM Coupé ==
MGT started working on their own home computer, the SAM Coupé, early on, while profits from MGT's other product financed its development. The SAM was essentially a ZX Spectrum 48K-compatible system with enhanced graphics and sound, more interfaces, expanded memory and a new BASIC interpreter. The machine was eventually launched late in 1989. While technically advanced, it arrived too late to establish a market and resulted in the company's demise. The rights to the +D interface were sold to Datel Electronics Limited in an effort to finance the SAM Coupé. Alan Miles and Bruce Gordon bought the assets of MGT to form Sam Computers. However, that was a temporary reprieve and that company also ceased trading in 1992.
