= Astroball =

1992 video game

- Developer: Balor Knight
- Publisher: Revelation
- Platforms: ZX Spectrum, SAM Coupé
- Release: 1992
- Genre: Platform
- Mode: Single-player

Astroball is a platform game for the ZX Spectrum and SAM Coupé, written by Balor Knight and published by Revelation.

A sequel, Turbulence, set on a rotating sphere, was released for the Spectrum in 1993.

== Gameplay ==
The player controls a bouncing ball and collects coins from each level before proceeding to a level's exit. Small spikes, named Deathstars, are to be avoided, as any collision results in a life being lost. The game also features "blinking" platforms, which can only be used for bouncing when visible, requiring careful timing from the player.

Various power-ups can be collected, including extra time, temporary invulnerability, and a slow motion mode. The main power-up item will cycle between the various power-ups available, and its sprite updates accordingly. Most levels require the player to determine the appropriate power-ups to be collected to progress through the level.

== Reception ==
Your Sinclair gave Astroball a rating of 90, calling the game "sheer, unadulterated fun".
