= Mrs. Mop =

Card game

- A Patience game
- Family: Spider
- Deck: Double 52-card

Mrs. Mop is a patience or solitaire card game which is played using two decks of playing cards. Invented by Charles Jewell, it is a relative of the solitaire game Spider in which all of the cards are dealt face up at the beginning of the game. The rules are simple, but working out the right thing to do is a slow process, in which "patience" may be an important word. If you can make a couple of spare columns, your chance of winning is pretty good.

== Rules ==
First the cards are dealt into thirteen columns of eight cards each. The player will then aim to form eight full suit sequences of 13 cards each. Every sequence should run from King down to Ace.

To achieve this, the cards are built down regardless of suit. One card can be moved at a time, unless there are two or more cards of the same suit forming a sequence (such as ♠7-6-5-4) at which case they are moved as a single unit. Because all the cards are visible at the outset, Mrs Mop is arguably one of the most skill-based rather than luck-based solitaire games.

When a suit sequence is formed on the same column, running from King down to Ace (such as ♣K-Q-J-10-9-8-7-6-5-4-3-2-A), the sequence is discarded. This game is won when all eight such sequences are removed.

Like in Spider, it is generally a good idea for the player to build down in suit whenever possible because the earlier this is done, the sooner a sequence is removed, giving the player more space to maneuver.

If you can make a couple of spaces you can sort many non-suit sequences into suit sequences. Making four spaces pretty much guarantees a win. Finding columns all of whose cards can be built on others is therefore a good tactic.

== See also ==
- Spider
- List of solitaire games
- Glossary of solitaire terms
