= Microsoft Entertainment Pack =

Series of computer game compilations

- Cover art for Pack 1
- Developer: Microsoft
- Publisher: Microsoft
- Designer: Robert Andrews
- Platforms: Microsoft Windows; Game Boy Color
- Release: 1990 (Pack 1); 1991 (Pack 2); 1991 (Pack 3); 1992 (Pack 4); 1994 (The Best of); May 30, 2001 (GBC)
- Genre: Various
- Mode: Single-player

Microsoft Entertainment Pack, also known as Windows Entertainment Pack or simply WEP, is a collection of 16-bit casual computer games for Windows. There were four Entertainment Packs released between 1990 and 1992. These games were somewhat unusual for the time, in that they would not run under MS-DOS. In 1994, a compilation of selected games from the previous four Entertainment Packs was released called The Best of Microsoft Entertainment Pack. A Game Boy Color version was released in 2001.

Microsoft advertised Entertainment Packs for casual gaming on office computers. The boxes had slogans like "No more boring coffee breaks" and "Only a few minutes between meetings? Get in a quick game of Klotski". The marketing succeeded; Computer Gaming World in 1992 described the series as "the Gorillas of the Gaming Lite Jungle", with more than 500,000 copies sold.

Minesweeper from pack 1 was later bundled with Windows 3.1, and FreeCell was included in Windows 95. WinChess and Taipei, both written by David Norris, received remakes in Windows Vista, called Chess Titans and Mahjong Titans, respectively. Mahjong Titans was replaced with Microsoft Mahjong in Windows 8. Microsoft Solitaire Collection also includes versions of Tut's Tomb (as Pyramid) and TriPeaks.

== List of games ==
=== Microsoft Entertainment Pack 1 ===
- Cruel (a card game)
- Golf (a card game) (Note: Included in Best of Microsoft Entertainment Pack)
- Minesweeper, written by David Bauer (Note: Bundled in some later versions of Windows)
- Pegged (a form of Peg solitaire), written by Mike Blaylock
- Taipei (later known as Mahjong Titans and Microsoft Mahjong)
- Tetris (Windows version)
- TicTactics (a Tic-tac-toe variant)
- IdleWild (a screensaver program), written by Brad Christian

=== Microsoft Entertainment Pack 2 ===
- FreeCell (a card game)
- Jigsawed (a Jigsaw puzzle)
- Pipe Dream (by LucasArts), written by Eric Geyser
- Rattler Race
- Rodent's Revenge
- Stones, developed by Michael C. Miller
- Tut's Tomb (a card game)
- IdleWild (a screensaver program) – 8 new screen savers for this pack

=== Microsoft Entertainment Pack 3 ===
- Fuji Golf (a golf game)
- Klotski
- Life Genesis (based on Conway's Game of Life, with a two-player mode added)
- SkiFree, written by Chris Pirih
- TetraVex
- TriPeaks (a card game)
- WordZap (a word game)
- IdleWild (a screensaver program) – 8 new screen savers for this pack

=== Microsoft Entertainment Pack 4 ===
- Chess
- Chip's Challenge, written by Chuck Sommerville
- Dr. Black Jack, a card game created by Mike Blaylock, based on the game of the same name
- Go Figure!
- JezzBall
- Maxwell's Maniac
- Tic Tac Drop, a form of Connect Four with quadrilateral, triangular and plus-shaped boards and customizable win pattern and number of rows and columns

=== The Best of Microsoft Entertainment Pack ===
The Best of Microsoft Entertainment Pack is a collection of 13 games from previous Entertainment Packs. A Game Boy Color version was released in June 2001 in North America and August 2001 in Europe. It was developed by Saffire and published by Conspiracy Entertainment under the Classified Games label in North America and Cryo Interactive in Europe.

Windows

- Tetris
- FreeCell
- Pipe Dream
- Chip's Challenge
- Taipei
- Tut's Tomb
- Rodent's Revenge
- TriPeaks
- Golf
- SkiFree
- JezzBall
- Dr. Black Jack
- TetraVex

Game Boy Color

- Tut's Tomb
- TriPeaks
- FreeCell
- TicTactics
- Minesweeper
- Life Genesis
- SkiFree

=== Entertainment Pack for Windows CE ===
In 1997, Microsoft released a port of Entertainment Pack to its Windows CE mobile platform. It included the following games:

- Blackjack
- Chess
- Freecell
- Taipei
- Hearts
- Minesweeper
- Reversi
- Sink the Ships*
- Space Defence*
- Codebreaker*

Three of these games (marked with * above) were unique to the Windows CE version. Three of the games (Hearts, Reversi and Sink the Ships) included multiplayer functionality between palmtops equipped with infrared ports.

== Development ==
Microsoft Entertainment Pack was designed by the company's “Entry Business” team, whose job was to make Windows more appealing to homes and small businesses. Ex-Microsoft product manager Bruce Ryan said the company did this because it "was concerned that the operating system’s high hardware requirements meant that people would only see it as a tool for large enterprises". The project had "almost no budget", and no major video game publishers got involved because they doubted Windows' legitimacy as a gaming platform; therefore Ryan compiled a series of games that Windows employees had been working on in their spare time. According to Microsoft FreeCell developer Jim Horne, the packs were not copy protected so customers could distribute copies to friends, to encourage using Windows for games. As payment, each author received ten shares of Microsoft stock.

For much of the early 1990s, the Gamesampler, a subset of the Entertainment Pack small enough to fit on a single high-density disk, was shipped as a free eleventh disk added to a ten-pack of Verbatim blank 3.5" microfloppy diskettes. Games on the sampler included Jezzball, Rodent's Revenge, Tetris, and Skifree. A "Best of" disk of several of the games was also available at times as a mail-in premium from Kellogg's cereals.

All games being 16-bit run on modern 32-bit versions of Windows but not on 64-bit Windows. Support for all versions of Microsoft Entertainment Pack ended on January 31, 2003.

In the copies of Windows NT 4.0 and Windows 2000 source code which leaked in 2004, there are 32-bit versions of Cruel, Golf, Pegged, Reversi, Snake (Rattler Race), Taipei and TicTactics. However, FreeCell and Minesweeper have had official 32-bit versions bundled even with early versions of Windows NT. The original game developers of some of the games such as SkiFree, TriPeaks, and WordZap now offer 32-bit versions. Third-party developers have also created 32-bit freeware clones of Klotski, TetraVex, Rodent's Revenge, Tetris, and Taipei.

== Reception ==
Digital Trends noted, "For many, the simple but enjoyable games found in the Entertainment Pack provided a first taste of early PC gaming and served as a gateway to more complex classics." PC World described the pack as having "standout time-wasters".

== See also ==
- List of games included with Windows
- Microsoft Entertainment Pack: The Puzzle Collection – a later 32-bit collection for Windows 95
- Microsoft Pinball Arcade
- Microsoft Arcade
