= Philips SAA1099 =

Sound generator integrated circuit

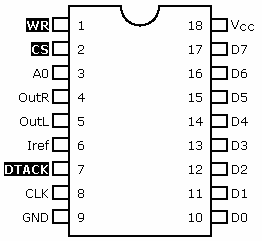
Philips SAA1099
Pin	Name	Dir	Description
1	/WR		Write Enable
2	/CS		Chip Select
3	A0		Control/Address Select
4	OutR		Sound Output Right
5	OutL		Sound Output Left
6	Iref		Reference Current Supply
7	/DTACK		Data Transfer Acknowledge
8	CLK		External Clock
9	GND		Ground
10	D0		Data Bus 0
11	D1		Data Bus 1
12	D2		Data Bus 2
13	D3		Data Bus 3
14	D4		Data Bus 4
15	D5		Data Bus 5
16	D6		Data Bus 6
17	D7		Data Bus 7
18	Vcc		Power +5V

The Philips SAA1099 sound generator is a 6-voice sound chip used by some 1980s devices.

It can produce several different waveforms by locking the volume envelope generator to the frequency generator, and also has a noise generator with 4 preset frequencies which can be locked to the frequency generator for greater range. It can output audio in fully independent stereo.

== Uses ==
The following sound cards and computers used the SAA1099:

- Silicon Graphics IRIS Professional 4D and IRIS Power 4D machines, released in 1987 and 1988, used the SAA1099 on the IO2 and IO3 board for sound generation. Although this feature was almost never documented or used, the chip is present and usable if addressed directly.
- The Creative Music System (C/MS) by Creative Labs, released in 1987, and also marketed at RadioShack as the Game Blaster, released in 1988. These devices contain two SAA1099 chips, for twelve voices.
- The Creative Sound Blaster 1.0 card released in 1989 (and 1.5 and 2.0 as an optional addon), included the SAA1099 chips, in addition to the OPL2 chip (aka YM3812), which became much more popular.
- The British-made SAM Coupé computer released in 1989, with a single SAA1099 on the motherboard.
- Various Gaelco arcade games, the JPM System 5 family and the Barcrest MPU4 Video Board used the SAA1099.
