= Black Hole (card game) =

Solitaire game

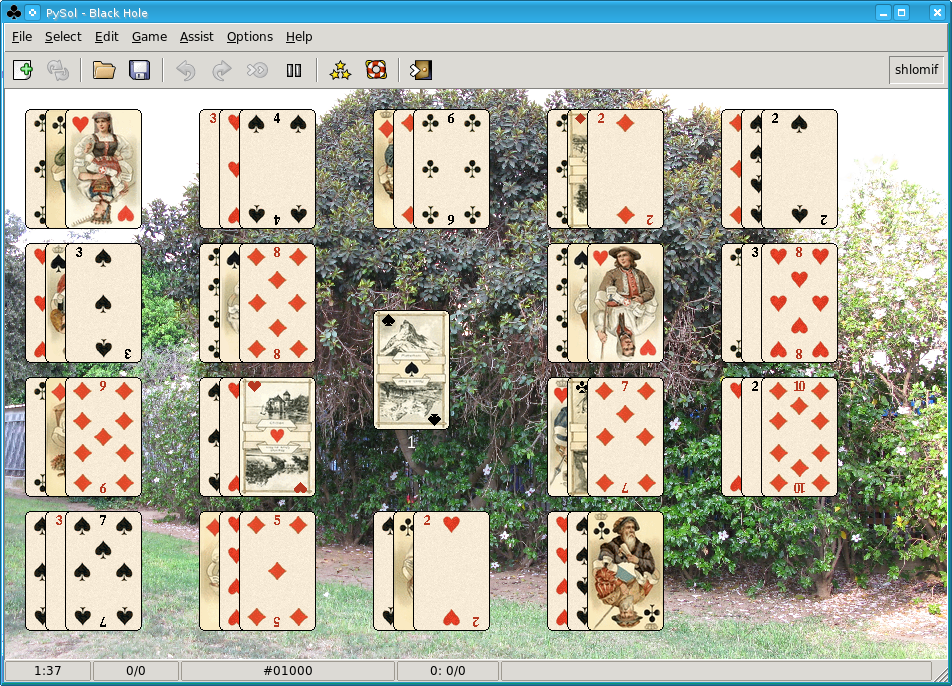
A Deal of Black Hole in PySolFC

Black Hole is a patience or solitaire card game. It is of the open builder type; its play is similar to Golf and Tri Peaks, but with a tableau of fans like that of La Belle Lucie. Invented by David Parlett, this game's objective is to compile the entire deck into one foundation.

== Rules ==
The cards are dealt to the tableau in piles of three. The leftover card, dealt first or last, is placed as a single foundation called the Black Hole. This card is usually the Ace of Spades, but any card can do.

Only the top cards of each pile in the tableau are available for play, and in order for a card to be placed in the Black Hole, it must be a rank higher or lower than the top card on the Black Hole, ignoring suit. This is the only allowable move in the entire game. Aces and Kings are considered consecutive, thus allowing wrapping.

The game ends if there are no more top cards that can be moved to the Black Hole. The game is won if all of the cards end up in the Black Hole.

== Analysis ==
Shlomi Fish wrote a program that attempted to solve one million deals, of which 869,413 could be solved and the 130,587 others were fully traversed without finding a possible solution, yielding a winning rate of over four fifths (87%). A generalised version of the Black Hole patience is NP-complete.

The game typically offers multiple paths, and to have the best chance of succeeding, players should try to look a few moves ahead and eliminate lines of play that lead to a dead end.

== Variants ==
All in a Row is somewhat similar to Black Hole. It is played with 13 columns of 4 cards each, and at the start of play, the first move can be made from any column.

== See also ==
- List of solitaires
- Glossary of solitaire
