= JezzBall =

1992 video game

The initial appearance of the first level

JezzBall is a video game originally published for Microsoft Windows in 1992. The player must capture parts of a rectangular space by dividing it with horizontal or vertical lines. While each line is being drawn, it must not be touched by bouncing balls. JezzBall has similarities with Qix, a 1981 arcade game.

JezzBall was programmed by Dima Pavlovsky. It was published in 1992 as part of the Microsoft Entertainment Pack and later released within The Best of Microsoft Entertainment Pack.

== Gameplay ==
The game starts with two atoms (red-and-white balls), bouncing about a room (the rectangular field of play). The player points at a position within the room and clicks to start building either vertical or horizontal lines, also called walls, from the pointer position, either up and down or left and right. If the walls reach the edge of the area without a ball colliding into them then the area bound by the line and not containing a ball is 'captured' and filled black. If a ball collides with a wall while it is building then the wall stops at that point and the player loses a life. The player has a time limit within which to capture at least 75% of the room's surface area. When that percentage is exceeded, the level is complete and the player progresses to a fresh room with one more atom bouncing in it than in the previous level. There are an infinite number of levels, but from level 49 onwards every level starts with 50 atoms.

The game is controlled by a standard pointing device such as a mouse. Right-click alternates between horizontal and vertical orientation for wall creation, while left-click starts the walls building.

The player begins each level with the same number of lives as there are atoms in that level. The game finishes if all lives are lost.

== See also ==
- Maxwell's Maniac
