= Charles Jewell =

British philatelist

Charles John Jewell (6 November 1892 – 14 March 1975) was a British philatelist who was added to the Roll of Distinguished Philatelists in 1966.

He invented the card game Mrs. Mop, a two-pack version of patience that is extremely difficult to complete successfully.
