= Microsoft Spider Solitaire =

Solitaire game in Microsoft Windows

Spider Solitaire

- Spider Solitaire in Windows 7
- Developer: Microsoft
- Release: June 25, 1998; 28 years ago
- Operating system: Microsoft Windows
- Successor: Microsoft Solitaire Collection
- Type: Computer game

Microsoft Solitaire Collection on Windows 10, in Spider mode

Spider Solitaire, also known as Microsoft Spider Solitaire (Spider in the About box in some versions), is a solitaire (NA)/patience (EU) card game that is included in Microsoft Windows. It is a version of Spider. As of 2005, it was the most played game on Windows PCs, surpassing the shorter and less challenging Klondike-based Windows Solitaire.

The game was first included as part of Windows 98's Microsoft Plus! package on its release on June 25, 1998 and has been since featured on most subsequent versions of Windows. Spider Solitaire was not included in Windows 2000, but was added to Windows Me and later on Windows XP; the game gained popularity subsequent to its inclusion in the latter. Windows Vista again saw a new version, which was mainly unchanged in Windows 7. Finally, Windows 8 has another updated version available in the Windows Store as part of Microsoft Solitaire Collection but not bundled with the operating system. Windows 10 has the Microsoft Solitaire Collection app updated and bundled with the OS.

== Gameplay ==
The game is played with two decks of cards for a total of 104 cards. Fifty-four of the cards are laid out horizontally in ten columns with only the top card showing. The remaining fifty cards are laid out in the lower right hand corner in five piles of ten with no cards showing.

In the horizontal columns a card may be moved to any other card in the column as long as it is in descending numerical sequence. For example, a six of hearts may be moved to a seven of any suit. However, a sequence of cards can only be moved if they are all of the same suit in numerical descending order. For example, a six and seven of hearts may be moved to an eight of any suit, but a six of hearts and seven of clubs cannot be moved together. Moving the top card in a column allows the topmost hidden card to be turned over. This card then enters into the play. Other cards can be placed on it, and it can be moved to other cards in a sequence or to an empty column.

The object of the game is to uncover all the hidden cards and by moving cards from one column to another to place cards in sequential order from King to Ace using the fewest moves. Each final sequence must be all of the same suit. Once a complete sequence is achieved the cards are removed from the table and 100 points are added to the score. Once a player has made all the moves possible with the current card layout, the player draws a new row of cards from one of the piles of ten in the lower right-hand corner by clicking on the cards. Each of the ten cards in this draw lands face up on each of the ten horizontal columns and the player then proceeds to place these in such a way to create a sequence of cards all in one suit.

== Features ==
There are three levels of difficulty in Spider Solitaire: Beginner (one suit), Intermediate (two suits), and Advanced (four suits).

Spider Solitaire has an "undo" feature that allows moves to be retracted. Any number of moves can be retracted, back to the last non-retractable move, but each "undo" subtracts one from the score.

To aid the player, the key H (Windows Vista or later only) or M will highlight possible moves, whereas in the Windows XP version this is done by clicking on the score panel. The player can also undo previous moves and try again. Windows keeps track of scores for the player's reference; these may be viewed by going to Game and then Statistics. In Windows 7, these scores appear in the Games Explorer by clicking the game and selecting the Statistics tab in the Preview Pane. There are two measures of performance in Spider Solitaire: number of games won and highest score. In a certain sense these two measures are negatively correlated: maximizing games won may yield lower scores per game and vice versa.

The final score in a Spider Solitaire game is calculated as follows. The initial score is 500 and every move subtracts one from the score. Using the "undo" feature also subtracts one point from the score. Every time the player is able to place an entire sequence of cards of the same suit in order (kings, queens, jacks, 10 9 8 7 6 5 4 3 2 ace), 100 points are added to the score. There are a total of eight such sequences in the game yielding a maximum achievable number of 800. Therefore, in a winning game the total score is 800 plus 500 minus the number of moves and "undos".

== In popular culture ==
Spider Solitaire was referenced on the February 27, 2021 episode of Saturday Night Live. In the cold opening sketch, "So You Think You Can Get the Vaccine", 85-year-old contestant, Seymour Forman, (played by Mikey Day) was asked if he was computer literate enough to make an appointment online for a COVID-19 vaccine. After replying "on what?," Mr. Forman was then asked if he had a computer at home. He replied, "for Spider Solitaire."

== See also ==
- List of games included with Windows
