= Microsoft FreeCell =

Video game included in Microsoft Windows

FreeCell

- FreeCell on Windows 7
- Original author: Jim Horne
- Developer: Microsoft
- Release: 1991; 35 years ago
- Operating system: Microsoft Windows
- Platform: IA-32, x86-64 (and historically DEC Alpha, Itanium, MIPS, and PowerPC)
- Successor: Microsoft Solitaire Collection (Windows 10)
- Type: Computer game

FreeCell, also known as Microsoft FreeCell, is a computer game included in Microsoft Windows, based on a card game with the same name. It is one of the most widely used Windows programs, estimated to be ahead of Word and Microsoft Excel. It has been included with every release of the Windows operating system since 1995, which has greatly contributed to the original game's popularity.

== Development ==
Paul Alfille implemented Freecell in 1978 for the PLATO computer system at CERL; by the early 1980s Control Data Corporation had published it for all PLATO systems. Jim Horne, who enjoyed playing Freecell on the PLATO system at the University of Alberta, published a shareware $10 MS-DOS version with color graphics in 1988. That year Horne joined Microsoft, and later ported the game to Windows.

The Windows version was first included in Microsoft Entertainment Pack Volume 2 and later the "Best of Microsoft Entertainment Pack." It was subsequently included with Win32s as an application that enabled the testing of the 32-bit thunking layer to ensure that it was installed properly. However, FreeCell remained relatively obscure until it was released as part of Windows 95. In Windows XP, FreeCell was extended to support a total of 1 million card deals.

== Releases ==
Microsoft Solitaire Collection in Windows 10, in FreeCell mode

Today, there are FreeCell implementations for nearly every modern operating system as it is one of the few games pre-installed with every copy of Windows. Prior to Windows Vista, the versions for Windows were limited in their player assistance features, such as retraction of moves. The Windows Vista FreeCell implementation contains basic hints and unlimited move retraction (via the Undo menu choice or command), and the option to restart the game. Some features have been removed, such as the flashing screen to warn the player of one move remaining. FreeCell is not included in the Windows 8 operating system, but is available in the Windows Store as the free Microsoft Solitaire Collection, which is also bundled with Windows 10.

== Legacy ==
Microsoft created the Entertainment Packs to encourage non-business use of Windows. According to company telemetry FreeCell was the seventh most-used Windows program, ahead of Word and Microsoft Excel.

The original Microsoft FreeCell package supports 32,000 numbered deals, generated by a 15-bit, pseudorandom-number seed. These deals are known as the "Microsoft 32,000", and all but one of them have been completed. Later versions of FreeCell include more than one million deals. When Microsoft FreeCell became very popular during the 1990s, the Internet FreeCell Project attempted to solve all the deals by crowdsourcing consecutive games to specific people. The project ran from August 1994 to April 1995, and only #11982 proved unwinnable. Out of the current Microsoft Windows games, eight are unsolvable. Speedrun.com records the fastest time to solve a game is 7 seconds.

The significance of the "Microsoft 32,000" to many FreeCell players is such that other computer implementations of FreeCell will often go out of their way to guarantee compatibility with these deals, rather than simply using the most readily available random number generator for their target platforms.

As an easter egg, Microsoft intentionally includes a few impossible games, with negative numbers. Playing these games do not count towards the statistics recorded by the computer.

== See also ==
- List of games included with Windows
