= Tri Peaks (game) =

Card game

Beginning of a game.

Tri Peaks (also known as Three Peaks, Tri Towers or Triple Peaks) is a patience or solitaire card game that is akin to the solitaire games Golf and Black Hole. The game uses one deck and the object is to clear three peaks made up of cards. It was created by Robert Hogue in 1989, and popularized as a result of being included in Microsoft Solitaire Collection.

== Gameplay ==
The game starts with eighteen cards dealt face-down on the tableau to form three face-down "pyramids" of six cards each, and a row of ten cards beneath. This is built by dealing out ten cards face-up in a row; then nine cards face-down above them, offset by half a card to the right; then six cards above those, offset by the same amount (and leaving a one-card gap after the second and fourth cards); then three cards to cap the three pyramids.

The twenty-four remaining cards make up the stock. The first card from the stock is put in the waste pile (sometimes known as the foundation/discard). For a card in the tableau to be moved to the waste pile, it must be a rank higher or lower regardless of suit. This card becomes the new top card and the process is repeated several times (e.g. 7-8-9-10-9-10-J-10-9-8, etc.) until the sequence stops. Along the way, any face-down cards that are no longer overlapping are turned up.

In case the sequence is stopped, i.e. no card on the tableau can be put over the top card of the waste pile, a card is placed on the waste pile from the stock to see if it can start a new sequence. Cards are transferred from the stock to the waste pile one at a time as long as it does not begin a new sequence with the cards on the tableau.

If there is no scoring being tracked, the game is won if all three peaks are cleared before or after the last card from the stock is discarded to the waste pile. However, the game is lost if there are still cards that cannot be placed on the waste pile after the stock has run out. When a scoring system is used, the game takes on different strategies depending on the rules. For example, in the original TriPeaks game, winning was less about clearing the peaks, and more about the tactics of making the best choices to create better winnings and limit losses by possibly quitting early.

TriPeaks can also be played with a wild card. This variation makes it easier to clear all three peaks. It is also possible to make all cards in the peaks face-up; this makes the game more thoughtful and strategic. It is also possible that the waste pile is empty so that one of the exposed cards can be chosen to go to the waste pile for a "head-start."

== History ==
TriPeaks was invented in 1989 by Robert Hogue. Hogue has performed computer statistical analysis on the original game, which shows over 90% of all the games dealt are completely solvable and, under the original scoring system, an average of 60 is theoretically possible, which indicates the scoring system is balanced in such a way that the cost of the stock is paid for from the creation of the appropriate streaks during game play. This leaves all the bonus points for the player if the player has played the hand perfectly. Of course, since only a portion of the cards are known at the time of deal, the possibility of playing a perfect hand becomes very difficult. The average score per hand for most people is around 12. Players with better strategies and tactics have averaged over 17.

The original game shipped in Windows Entertainment Pack 3, and was eventually included as a standard part of in Microsoft Solitaire Collection. TriPeaks was created to allow for other layouts. The three peak layout was the original, but it was the intention of the inventor for others to adopt new layouts and create scoring rules to balance those new card layouts. In that regard, TriPeaks has been modified extensively and shipped in many different card packs.

== See also ==
- Microsoft Solitaire Collection
- Golf (patience)
- List of patience games (solitaire games)
- Glossary of solitaire terms
