= Golf (patience) =

Patience card game

- A Patience game
- Initial layout
- Family: Adding and pairing
- Deck: Single 52-card

Golf, also known as One Foundation, is a patience or solitaire card game where players try to earn the lowest number of points (as in golf, the sport) over the course of nine deals (or "holes", also borrowing from golf terminology). It has a tableau of 35 face-up cards and a higher ratio of skill to luck than most other solitaire card games. Its easy game-play also makes it within easy reach of first-timers, while still offering scope for strategic play.

== Rules ==
=== Setup ===
From a standard 52-card deck, 7 columns of 5 cards each are dealt, all face up and with indices visible. This is the tableau. One additional card is dealt as the base of the foundation. The remaining 16 cards are turned face down to form the stock.

=== Play ===
Rules are as follows:

- Only the topmost card in each column (closest to the player) may be removed from the tableau. When it is removed, the card beneath becomes available for play.
- Cards may be moved from the tableau to the foundation if they are either one rank higher or one rank lower than the top card of the foundation, regardless of suit, but nothing may be played on top of a King.
- Cards rank A 2 3 4 5 6 7 8 9 10 J Q K. There is no "wrapping" (Ace on a King, or King on an Ace) in the strict form of Golf.
- Whenever there are no possible plays, turn cards up one at a time from the stock to the foundation and resume playing cards from the tableau when possible.
- There is no redeal. The game is over when the stock is exhausted and no more moves are available.

=== Scoring ===
Player scores one point for each card remaining in the tableau after the stock has run out. If the tableau is cleared, player scores a negative point for every card left in the stock. Game is nine "holes" (deals) and a score of 45 or lower is considered par, with a score of zero or lower being perfect.

=== Impossible tableaus ===
If a tableau is dealt that would make it impossible for the player to clear all of the cards (e.g. if all queens are covered by kings), then the cards may be reshuffled and redealt.

== Variations ==
To make the game easier, common variations on these rules include:

- Queens may be played on top of Kings.
- Turning the corner is permitted so that a King can be played on top of an Ace, and vice versa. This variation is commonly called Putt Putt.
- One or both of the Jokers may be added to the deck and used as wild cards that represent any value.
- The foundation pile can start off empty, so players can choose one of the exposed cards to move them to the foundation for a "head-start".

Many variants exist which utilize the same style of game-play as Golf, but adjust the starting layout. The most well-known ones including Tri Peaks, Black Hole, and Pyramid Golf (also called Escalator). Multiple decks may also be used to create larger tableaus.

== Multiplayer Golf ==
Golf Patience can also be played as a competitive game for two or more players, either by playing a hole simultaneously and calculating their total score for 18 holes, or using match-play scoring which keeps track of how many holes you are ahead or behind your opponent (e.g. "two up" or "three down").

Spit is a real-time game for two players which employs a similar concept of game-play as Golf.

== See also ==
- Tri Peaks
- Black Hole
- List of solitaires
- Glossary of solitaire
