= Simple Simon (solitaire) =

Solitaire/patience card game

- A Patience game
- Family: Spider
- Deck: Single 52-card

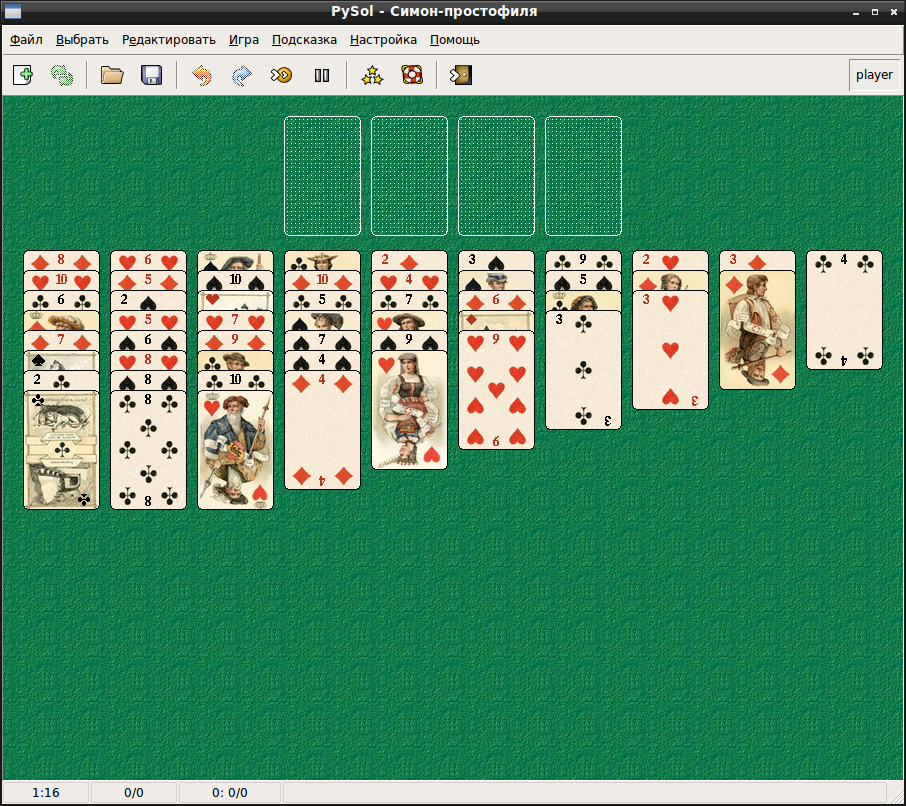
Initial Simple Simon layout on PySol Fan Club Edition.

Simple Simon is a patience or solitaire card game played with a regular 52 cards deck (4 suits of 13 cards each without Jokers). It is a close relative of the well-known Spider Solitaire. It became somewhat popular being featured in some computerized collections of Solitaire card games, but its origins possibly predate its implementation as a computerized game.

== Rules ==
At the beginning of the play the cards are dealt all facing the player, starting from 3 columns of 8 cards each, and then 7 columns with 7, 6, and so forth cards until 1.

A card can be placed on any card on the top of a column whose rank is greater than it by one (with no cards that can be placed above an Ace). A sequence of cards, decrementing in rank and of the same suit, can be moved as one. An empty column can be filled by any card. A sequence of cards from the king down to the Ace - all of the same suit - can be moved to the foundations. The object of the game is to place all four suits in the foundations.

== Strategy ==
A mixed-suit sequence of cards can be moved to a different location, given enough empty columns or parent cards to place intermediate components and sub-sequences of cards on. This is similar to FreeCell only with the individual components of the sequence being the same-suit sub-sequences rather than individual cards as in FreeCell. Note that some implementations of Simple Simon require the player to do all the moving of the individual components by himself.

== Statistics and analysis ==
In September 2001, Shlomi Fish adapted Freecell Solver, an automated solver for various solitaire card games, to solve Simple Simon. The statistics presented by the solver when run over a range of 4000 random games showed that about 85% of the games were solvable. Another programmer added another type of move which reportedly increased the percentage of games that were solvable by the solver to well over 90%.

In 2009 a more up-to-date version of Freecell Solver produced the result that the solver was able to solve 4,533 (or 90%) of the deals, and generally reached a conclusion within 100 moves. The comment has been made that this is "what makes the game a joy: either it's impossible to solve and you see it in the first moves or it's solvable and you only have to find the best route."

== See also ==
- Spider Solitaire
- List of solitaire games
- Glossary of solitaire terms
