= Spider (solitaire) =

Type of solitaire game

- Solitaire game
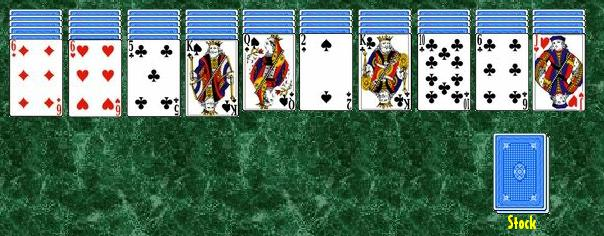
- One initial layout in the game of Spider
- Named variants: Relaxed Spider, Will o' the Wisp
- Family: Spider
- Deck: Double 52-card

Spider is a type of solitaire, and is one of the more popular two-deck solitaire games. The game originated in 1949, and its name comes from a spider's eight legs, referencing the eight foundation piles that must be filled in order to win.

== Rules ==
The main purpose of the game is to remove all cards from the table, assembling them in the tableau before removing them. Initially, 54 cards are dealt to the tableau in ten piles, face down except for the top cards. The tableau piles build down by rank, and in-suit sequences can be moved together. The 50 remaining cards can be dealt to the tableau ten at a time when none of the piles are empty.

A typical Spider layout requires the use of two decks. The tableau consists of 10 stacks, with 6 cards in the first 4 stacks, with the 6th card face up, and 5 cards in the remaining 6 stacks, with the 5th card face up. Each time the stock is used, it deals out one card to each stack.

== Variants ==
Given its popularity, numerous Spider variants exist:

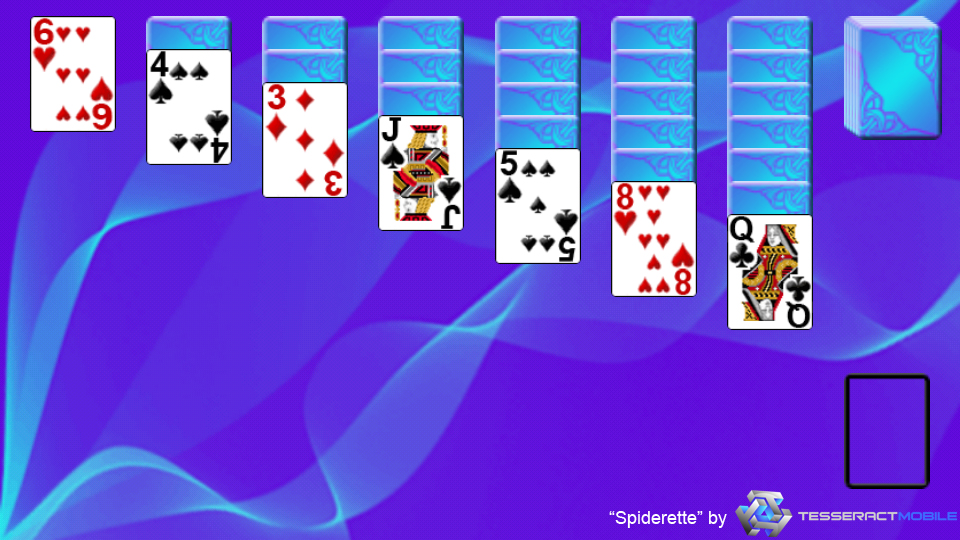
Spiderette layout

- Spider 2 Suit: Same as classic Spider solitaire, except this game is played with only 2 suits instead of 4, usually Spades and Hearts.
- Spider 1 Suit: Same as classic Spider solitaire, except this game is played with only 1 suit instead of 4, usually Spades.
- Relaxed Spider: Does not require all spaces to be filled before redealing
- Spiderette: Only one pack, a Klondike layout with 7 stacks ranging from 1 to 7 cards in each
- Will o' the Wisp is another solitaire card game which was invented by Geoffrey Mott-Smith and is played the same way as Spiderette. The exception is that on the onset, twenty-one cards are dealt into seven columns of three with only the top card of each column face-up.
- Simple Simon is another common one-deck variant of Spider.
- Mrs. Mop is a Spider relative in which all the cards are dealt face-up.

== Software ==
=== Implementations ===
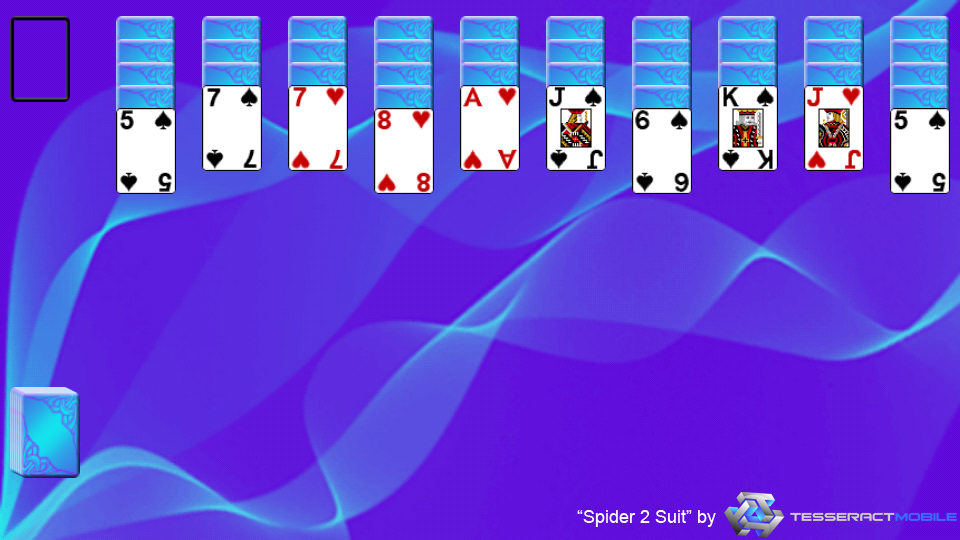
Spider 2 Suit layout

Common software versions of Spider are included with versions of Microsoft Windows 7, Vista, ME and XP as Spider Solitaire. Spider Solitaire was introduced in the Microsoft Plus! 98 addition pack for Windows 98. The game comes in three versions of difficulty: 1, 2, or 4 suits. These play modes are equivalent to disregarding suit difference, either within the colors or altogether.

An earlier version was written for Windows 3.x in 1991 by John A. Junod, the original developer of WS_FTP. He also wrote an MS-DOS version called EGA-Spider. A similar game called Arachnid was released for Windows 3.x in 1991 by Ian Heath, a computer science professor at the University of Southampton in the UK. It was rewritten for 32-bit operating systems and is referred to as Arachnid 32.

On Unix operating systems, an early version was developed around 1989 at Sun Microsystems. A version of Spider Solitaire typically comes bundled with both the KDE and GNOME desktop environments on other Unix-like operating systems such as Linux and BSD, under the names KPatience and AisleRiot Solitaire, respectively.

=== Scoring ===
Different software implementations of spider offer alternative scoring rules. The version from Sun Microsystems from 1989 defines the following rules in the manual: 10 points for each initially face down card that gets turned over; 15 additional points for each column where all the face-down cards have been turned over (even if you don't manage to get a space); 2 points for each card that is sitting atop the next higher card of the same suit; 50 points for each completed suit removed from the tableau (in which case you do not also score for the 12 cards sitting atop next higher cards). This yields a maximum score of 990. If you win the game with 4 or more completed suits still in the tableau, add 2 points for each suit after the first three. Thus winning with all eight suits still in the tableau yields a score of 1000.

In the Windows versions of Spider Solitaire, the scoring is calculated with a starting score of 500. One point is subtracted for each move (including any use of an undo); 100 points are added for each in-suit stack completed.

=== Solvability ===
A detailed study has been done on the solvability of Spider solitaire games using software. Winning chances in a normal game with good play are considered to be about 1 in 3 games.

== See also ==
- Simple Simon
- Mrs. Mop
- Solitaire terminology
- List of solitaires
