= Pyramid (solitaire) =

Solitaire card game

- A Patience game
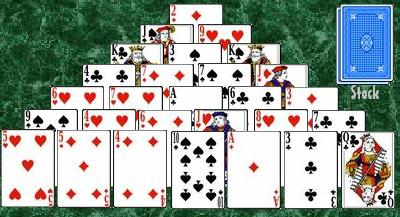
- The initial layout of the game of Pyramid
- Family: Adding and pairing
- Deck: Single 48 or 52-card

Pyramid is a patience or solitaire game of the Simple Addition family, where the object is to get all the cards from the pyramid to the foundation.

The object of the game is to remove pairs of cards that add up to a total of 13, the equivalent of the highest valued card in the deck, from a pyramid arrangement of 28 cards. When using the standard 52-card deck, Jacks are valued at 11, Queens at 12, and Kings at 13. Under the strictest rules, the odds of winning are around 1 in 50.

== Rules ==
To set up the pyramid, one card is dealt face up at the top of the playing area, then two cards beneath and partially covering it, then three beneath them, and so on completing with a row of seven cards for a total of 28 cards dealt (or six rows of 21 cards). The remaining cards are placed to the side face down, and make up the Stock.

To play, pairs of uncovered cards can be removed to the foundation if their values total 13. Thus, kings can be removed immediately to the foundation. In order to be removed, cards must not be covered, so when an Ace rests on a Queen, that Queen can not be removed. Discarded cards are removed from play and cannot be re-matched with other cards.

You may draw cards from the stock one at a time and match them with any exposed card. If no match is made, the drawn stock card is played into a waste pile. The top card of the waste pile can be matched at any time with the next card drawn from the stock, or any uncovered card in the pyramid. Once the stock is exhausted and/or no more pairs can be made, the game ends. (A variation, Par Pyramid, allows the waste to be turned over and dealt as a new stock twice.)

To score, count the number of remaining face up cards in the pyramid. A perfect score is therefore zero, where all cards have been matched into the Foundation.

To be considered won, all cards (cards from the pyramid and cards from the stock) must be moved to the foundation.

== Variations ==
Given the popularity of Pyramid, many different variants exist which alter aspects of the game, including the following:

- Relaxed Pyramid: To be considered won, only the cards from the pyramid must be moved to the foundation, so the game can be won with cards still left in the stock or waste.
- Tut's Tomb (also called King Tut): Dealing three cards at a time from the stock, repeating until no matches can be made; placing all cards totalling 13 in a stack. The King of Spades is laid down first, and represents King Tutankhamen atop a pyramid.
- Apophis: Using three waste piles instead of one.
- Giza: In a version created by Michael Keller, after the pyramid is formed, the rest of the deck is dealt as three rows of eight cards (i.e. eight columns of three overlapping cards) with the exposed cards open to match the exposed cards from the pyramid or other exposed cards.
- Triangle: The initial deal consists of an inverted pyramid.
- Redeals may be allowed.
- A reserve of seven (or six) cards is dealt below the pyramid. These cards can match each other exposed cards in the pyramid or from the stack.
- Playing with a cell, filled either from the tableau or from the waste upcard.

Several variations allow a card on the pyramid to be removed in combination with a card covered by the first, so long as neither card is covered by a card not in the combo. For example, in the case of an exposed ace resting on a queen, the queen can be removed with the ace if no other cards are covering them, but if (for example) a jack is also on the queen, the queen cannot be removed. Other versions require that both cards be fully exposed to begin with.

When playing with a 48-card Spanish deck the highest valued cards are the Kings at 12, and thus pairs of exposed cards can be removed if their values total 12.

A variation of the game was released on the Microsoft Entertainment Pack 2 in 1991, under the name Tut's Tomb. It has also been added to Microsoft Solitaire Collection for Windows 8, Windows 10, Android, and iOS. When the game is played through Microsoft Solitaire Collection, the cards in the Stock are face-up rather than face-down.

== See also ==
- List of solitaires
- Glossary of solitaire
