= Floppy disk drive interface =

Computer storage bus

Each generation of floppy disk drive (FDD) began with a variety of incompatible interfaces but soon evolved into one de facto standard interface for the generations of 8-inch FDDs, 5.25-inch FDDs and 3.5-inch FDDs. For example, before adopting 3.5-inch FDD standards for interface, media and form factor there were drives and media proposed by Hitachi, Tabor, Sony, Tandon, Shugart and Canon.

== Sizes ==
=== 8 inch ===
The de facto standard 8 inch FDD interface is based upon the Shugart Associates models SA800/801 FDDs and models SA850/851 FDDs. The signal interface uses a 50-pin PCB edge connector which mates to a flat ribbon cable connector. Separate connectors are provided for both AC and DC power, as many 8-inch drives used AC spindle motors.

=== 5.25 inch ===
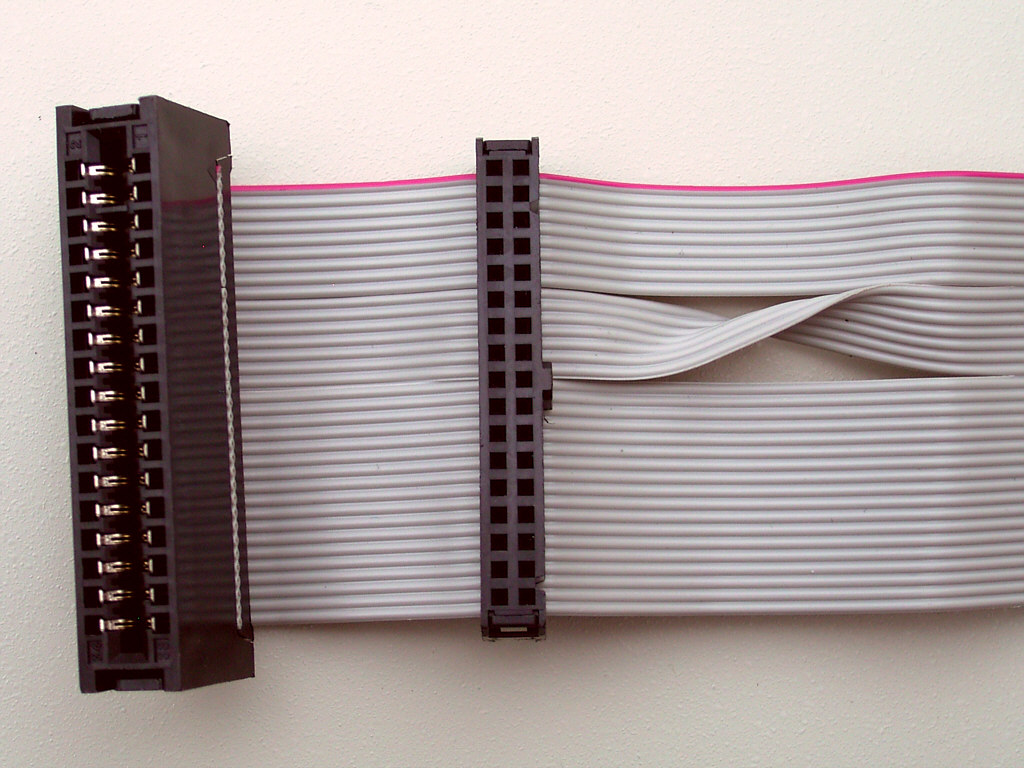
Connectors for 5.25 inch or 3.5 inch FDD (Drive "A") at end of universal two drive FDD cable. Note twist in flat cable.

The de facto standard 5.25-inch FDD interface is based upon the Shugart Associates SA400 FDD. The signal interface uses a 34-pin PCB edge connector which mates to a flat ribbon cable connector. DC power is provided on a separate connector. The 34-pin connector is similar in pinout to the standard 50-pin connector for 8-inch FDDs.

=== 3.5 inch ===
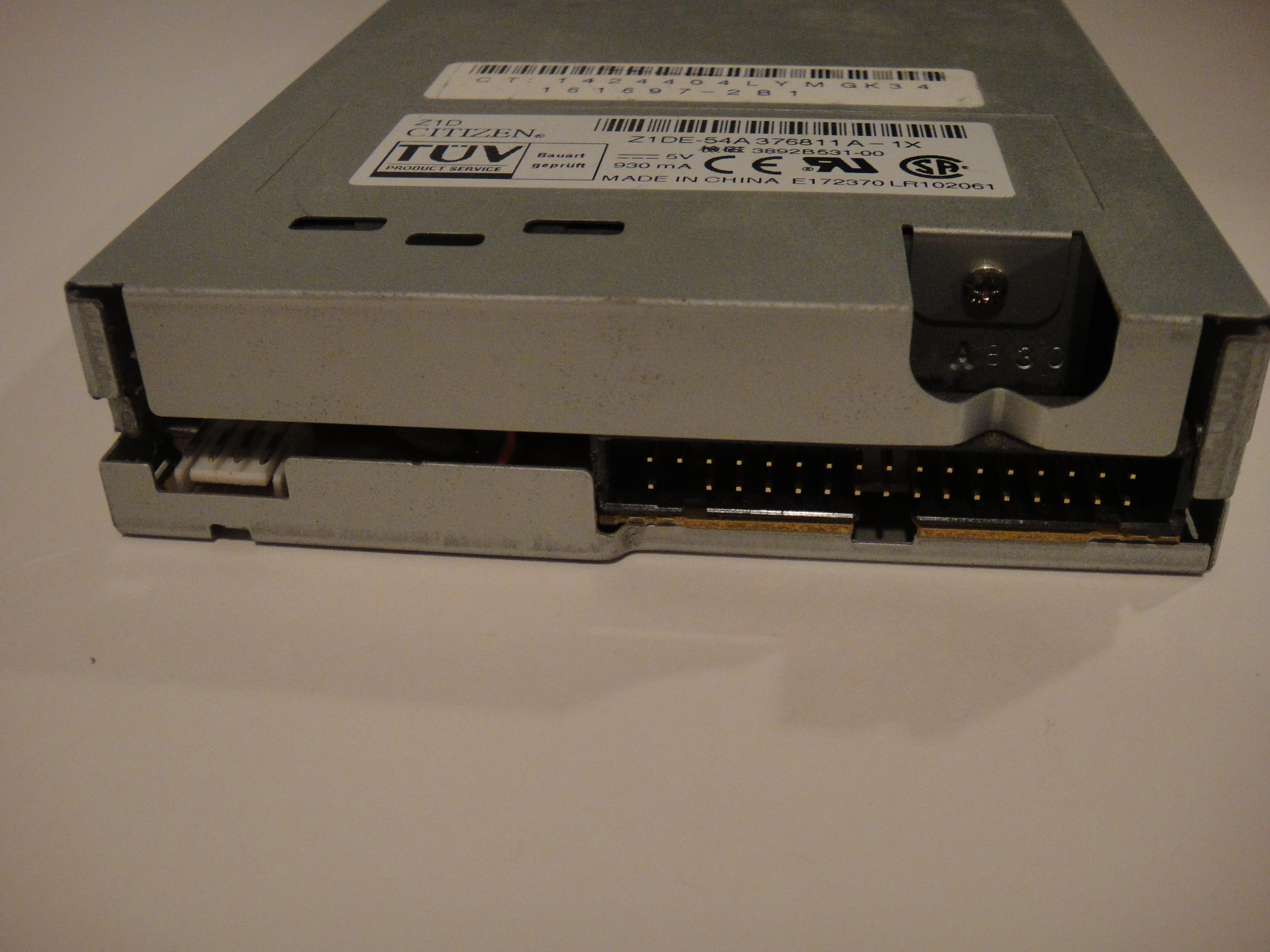
34-pin data connector (right side) on the back of a 3.5" floppy drive. It looks similar to the Parallel ATA connector.

The de facto standard for 3.5-inch drives uses a 34-pin header that mates to an IDC connector, collectively slightly smaller than the PCB edge pin connector and mating socket used for the 5¼-inch standard, but with the same 34-pin definitions as the 5¼-inch standard. A separate Berg connector is provided for DC power. A 'universal' cable would have four drive connectors, two for each size of FDD, although cables which have only two drive connectors are common. The cable is normally a ribbon cable. For IBM-compatible floppy controllers, a twist in the cable reverses the order of conductors 10 through 16 for the second connector. This allows two drives connected to the same cable to be addressed by the host controller without having to select drive assignments with jumpers on the drives themselves. Only two drives may be connected to such a cable. If there are four drive connectors, at least two must remain unused.

== Signal and control interface ==
3.5-inch and 5.25-inch drives connect to the floppy controller using a 34-conductor flat ribbon cable for signal and control. Most controllers support two floppy drives, although the Shugart standard supports up to four drives attached to a single controller. A cable could have 5.25-inch style connectors, 3.5-inch style connectors, or a combination. After IBM introduced the "twist" to floppy cables, and when both 5.25-inch and 3.5-inch drives were in common use, many cables had four connectors: one of each type before the twist, and one of each type after the twist. These cables still only supported two drives, one before and one after the twist, but they allowed using one cable for any combination of drives with differing connectors. This type of cable is called a universal cable.

When multiple floppy disks are connected, many pins are shared, including the read and write data pins. As a result, early floppy drives required jumpers to be set on the drive to tell it which controller commands it should receive. When introducing the PC, IBM sliced the cable between the first and second drive, and twisted seven of the conductors, effectively flipping the four conductors which specifically addressed the first or second drive. (The remaining three were ground only, so were not affected by the twist.) As a result, all drives could have their jumpers set to be drive "B", but if they were connected after the twist, they would appear to the controller as drive "A". This eliminated the need to change selection jumpers in the drive, and eventually many floppy drives were manufactured without jumpers at all, instead being hardwired as drive "B". As the IBM PC created a market for clones and compatibles, many manufacturers adopted the same cable twist system, although jumpers may still be required on systems that are older, or not based on the IBM PC.

The drive that is at the furthest end of the cable additionally would have a terminating resistor installed to maintain signal quality.

The following explanation of pinout is for reference only.

Floppy drive connector pinout (host controller as a reference)
Pin number	Abbreviation	Description	Notes	Type
2	DENSEL	Density Select 1=Low/0=High	The default use is 0	Output
4	RSVD	Reserved	No connection or connect to the ground	
6	RSVD	Reserved	No connection or connect to the ground	
8	INDEX#	Index	0=Index	Input
10	MOTEA#	Motor A Enable	0=Motor Enable Drive 0	Output
12	DRVSB	Drive Select B		Output
14	DRVSA	Drive Select A		Output
16	MOTEB#	Motor B Enable	0=Motor Enable Drive 1	Output
18	DIR#	Direction Select	Low Current/Direction in uPD765 controller	Output
20	STEP#	Head Step	Fault Reset/Step in uPD765 controller	Output
22	WDATA	Write Data		Output
24	WGATE#	Floppy Write Enable	0=Write Gate	Output
26	TRK0#	Track 0	Fault/Track 0 in uPD765 controller	Input
28	WPT#	Write Protect	0=Write Protect	Input
30	RDATA#	Read Data		Input
32	HDSEL#/SIDE	Head Select; Side select	0=Head 0 (upper head/side) 1=Head 1 (lower head/side)	Output
34	DSKCHG#	Disk Change	1=Disk Change/0=Ready	Input
3	RSVD	Reserved	No connection or connect to the ground	
5	N/C	No connection	Pins usually do not exist here to prevent the male plug from being inserted in the opposite direction	
Odd pins 1 thru 33	GND	Ground	Except for the 3rd and 5th pins	Power

"#" indicates that the low electric level is effective (aka "active low").

Motor A,B is also known as Motor 0,1.

Since floppy disks are rarely used nowadays, "MOTEB#" and "DRVSB" pins are not connected in motherboards designed with floppy disk data interfaces, and only one floppy disk drive can be connected.

Floppy drive A/B twist pinout
Wire	Controller	Drive A	Drive B	Description
1-9	1-9	1-9	1-9	No Change
10	10	16	10	Motor Enable Drive 0/1
11	11	15	11	Ground, No Change
12	12	14	12	Drive Select 0/1
13	13	13	13	Ground, No Change
14	14	12	14	Drive Select 0/1
15	15	11	15	Ground, No Change
16	16	10	16	Motor Enable Drive 0/1
17-34	17-34	17-34	17-34	No Change

== See also ==
- Floppy disk controller
- Floppy drive power connector
