= +D =

Floppy disk

The +D (or Plus D) was a floppy disk and printer interface for the ZX Spectrum home computer. It was designed to be smaller and more reliable than its predecessor, the DISCiPLE, with fewer ports and steel casing to act as a heatsink. It saw little support from commercial software, but several games were compatible with +D hardware, notably games created by Zenobi Software. It was also used by AlchNews and Outlet, two magazines that covered electronics.
