= Features new to Windows Vista =

Features added to Windows Vista

Compared with previous versions of Microsoft Windows, features new to Windows Vista are numerous, covering most aspects of the operating system, including additional management features, new aspects of security and safety, new I/O technologies, new networking features, and new technical features. However, Windows Vista also removed some features that originated in earlier versions of Windows and last seen in Windows XP.

== Windows Shell and user interface ==
=== Windows Aero ===
Windows Vista introduces a new user experience based on a user interface and visual style called Windows Aero (a backronym for Authentic, Energetic, Reflective, and Open). Microsoft intended for Windows Aero to be aesthetically pleasing, and cleaner than interfaces in previous versions of Windows. Windows Aero introduces blurred, translucent glass window frames; dynamic light effects; dynamic taskbar thumbnail previews of open windows; and window animations facilitated by the new Desktop Window Manager. Moreover, Windows Aero encompasses new sets of cursors, fonts (the Segoe UI typeface), notifications, sounds, and wizards, as well as revisions to prose and tone of text used throughout the operating system.

Windows Aero is available in the Home Premium, Business, Enterprise, and Ultimate Windows Vista editions.

All editions of Windows Vista include a new Windows Vista Basic theme with updated visuals; it is equivalent to Luna of Windows XP in that it does not rely on a compositing window manager. Blurred glass translucencies, light effects, live thumbnails, and window animations of Windows Aero are not available with Windows Vista Basic. The Home Basic edition of Windows Vista additionally includes a unique Windows Vista Standard theme (having the same hardware requirements of Windows Aero) but Windows Vista Standard does not provide Windows Aero features such as blurred glass translucency or dynamic taskbar thumbnails.

=== Start menu ===
The Start menu has undergone a significant revision in Windows Vista, being updated in accordance with Windows Aero design principles, featuring blurred glass translucency and subtle light effects while Windows Aero is enabled. The current user's profile photo is present above the right column, and hovering over an item in the right column replaces the current user's profile photo with a dynamically changing icon to reflect the item that will be opened. The right column of the Start menu no longer shows icons for items, and the layout of items in this column has changed from Windows XP; the "Printers" and "Run..." commands are removed by default. "All Programs" is no longer a cascading listing of applications and folders; instead, applications and folders appear within a scrollable tree view list. The most significant change to the Start menu is the addition of a Start Search box that allows users to incrementally search for file names, file contents, and metadata, and which also functions as an application launcher. The power button now transitions to sleep mode by default.

Like Windows XP, Windows Vista also allows users to revert to the classic Start menu introduced in Windows 95.

=== Windows Explorer ===
==== Arrangement and visualization ====
The leftward Task Pane of Windows XP has been replaced by an upward Command Bar that provides the same contextual tasks and file operation commands. The Navigation Pane can now be enabled with these commands and tasks always available; in Windows XP, it was necessary to switch between the Navigation Pane and the Task Pane — both were not available simultaneously. The Navigation Pane itself has been updated to host optional Favorite Links. The menu bar is hidden by default, but it can be displayed with the ALT key. The address bar has been modified to present a breadcrumbs view, which shows the full path to the current location; clicking any location in the breadcrumb hierarchy navigates to that location, which eliminates the need to go back multiple times or up multiple directories—the Up button is removed accordingly. It is also possible to navigate to any subfolder of any parent folder of the current hierarchy by using the arrow between folders. Groups of items can now be contracted and expanded, and group headings can be clicked on to select all items belonging in specific groups. Groups additionally now feature the number of items in each group. Multiple groups of files can also be selected by clicking each group header while holding down CTRL. Windows Explorer also sorts files on-the-fly automatically as they are renamed or pasted.

==== File operations ====
When copying or moving files, Windows Explorer now displays the destination path and the source path, the number of items being transferred, and the transfer speed of items as megabytes per second (MB/s) (in addition to displaying an estimated completion time and the names of files being transferred as previous versions of Windows did). Conflicts now do not terminate file operations. If a conflict occurs with only one file, the user will be presented with options for resolution. If a conflict occurs with multiple files, the user can either apply the resolution to every file to avoid conflicts with other files in the operation or to only a single file (if two or more files have the same name, for example, users can rename the source file and retain both the destination file and the source file; in previous versions of Windows, the only options were to either replace the destination file or cancel the operation). If an external data storage device is disconnected while files are being moved or copied, the user can retry the copy or move without restarting the same file operation from the very beginning; this gives the user an option to reconnect the external data storage device without loss of data.

Additionally, if a file is in use by another application during a deletion, move, or rename operation, Windows Explorer introduces a new IFileIsInUse API that allows developers to inform of the application with an open handle on the file, which can provide users with options to close the application, switch to it to finish working on the file, or to terminate its open handle on the file.

If a user does not have permission to access an object, a new dialog box with an option to assign permissions appears (Click Continue to get access to this folder). If the user has been denied access to the object even after clicking Continue, a message with a hyperlink to the Security tab belonging to the corresponding object appears so that a user with the required permissions and privileges can change ownership of, and access to the object. In previous versions of Windows the user was only informed that access was denied, with no immediate, visible option for conflict resolution.

==== Icons ====
Icons in Windows Vista are visually more realistic than illustrative. Icons are scalable in size up to 256 × 256 pixels. Required icon sizes are 16 × 16, 32 × 32, and 256 × 256; optional sizes are 24 × 24, 48 × 48, 64 × 64, 96 × 96, and 128 × 128. Icons now display thumbnails depicting the actual contents of files. New media overlays are available for photo, track, and video thumbnails, which are now distinguished by an overlay of the icon of the application assigned as the default for the respective file types. File icon viewing modes are Extra Large, Large, Medium, Small, List, Details, and Tiles. It is possible to transition between icon viewing modes with an incremental slider or by holding down the CTRL key and scrolling with the mouse scroll wheel. To reduce the size of large icons, icons may be stored as compressed PNGs; to maintain backward compatibility with earlier versions of Windows, only larger sized icons can use lossless PNG.

In Windows XP icon view modes included Thumbnails, Tiles, Icons, List, Details and, in folders with photographs, an additional Filmstrip view; these modes could be switched individually between by means of a View context menu option or a Views toolbar button. With Windows Vista icon view modes include Extra Large Icons, Medium Icons, Small Icons, List, Details, and Tiles. Moreover, a new View Control has been introduced that enables incremental zooming between icon sizes; over 60 icon sizes for items in the Shell are available through the new View Control.

==== Metadata and organization ====
Windows Explorer in Windows Vista introduces significant changes from previous versions of Windows for the organization and visualization of items. Column header (property) controls are now available in all icon viewing modes in Windows Explorer (in Windows XP and earlier they were only available in Details view) and provide enhanced filtering, grouping, and sorting capabilities. New split buttons now appear next to column headers that, when clicked, display drop-down menus for column header properties for users to filter items by any property value of the selected column header. There were over 30 default properties by which to group or sort items in Windows XP. With Windows Vista, Microsoft introduced over 200 new properties for items, encompassing those for documents, photos, recorded television broadcasts, tracks, and videos; new properties are also introduced for attachments, contacts, and messages, which are kinds of items available in the Windows Shell for the first time in Windows Vista.

New organizational capabilities enabled by the Windows Search Index and platform include Stacks, which are collections of related items (depicted visually as a pile) assembled by a common property, and Saved Searches, which are built by specifying predicates on item properties, and separate the concept of organization from the concept of location; these features were originally intended to be provided by WinFS.

A new Details Pane allows users to add or change metadata of items (such as Author or Title) directly from within Windows Explorer — without requiring them to open the application that created the item or to open a separate dialog box. Many more properties are exposed to the Windows Shell in Windows Vista than in Windows XP. For instance, it is now possible to query for photos based on types of camera flashes or whether a camera flash was used at all. Windows Vista includes built-in support for Microsoft Office documents and other types of items; support for metadata belonging to new types or other unrecognized types can be added by writing Property Handlers for the types. Unlike previous versions of Windows, all metadata is stored within items in Windows Vista to ensure that it is not lost when items are copied to a CD-ROM, moved across machines or partitions, or sent as attachments in a message.

==== Sharing ====
With Windows Vista, individual items can be shared; in previous versions of Microsoft Windows it was possible only to designate a folder as a share, set permissions on individual files and folders (which meant that users had to gather and organize all of the desired items in the folder), then share the entire folder. A Share button on the new Command Bar appears when selecting both files and folders in Windows Vista — in Windows XP, the equivalent command on the Task Pane appeared only while a folder was selected — and there is a new context menu option (Share...) to share files when a file is selected. Access based directory enumeration ensures that users only see the shared resources on a network they have permission to access; previously users could see, but not access items that were not explicitly shared with them.

Windows Vista introduces a new Sharing Wizard that displays users and groups with whom the current user can share; sharers can select local sharees on the current PC or those from Active Directory, a Windows domain, or a workgroup when the sharer's PC is registered with a domain controller. If the desired user is not available, there is an option to create a new user account. When sharing with a user or group, there are three new permission levels that can be assigned; these permission levels create an abstraction over the previous access-control list interface, simplifying sharing for users:

- Reader: provides read-only access to all shared resources
- Contributor: provides read-only access to all shared resources, also allowing the sharee to add items and modify or delete the items they have added
- Co-owner: allows the sharee to access, modify, or delete shared resources or resource permissions

When an item has been shared, the Sharing Wizard additionally includes an option to automatically compose an email with an embedded hyperlink to the shared item so the recipient can easily access the file or folder.

There are new columns in Windows Explorer that indicate whether an item is shared and the sharees with whom an item is shared; users can now arrange and search for items based on these details (for example, to find all items shared with a specific user or group). Because it can be difficult to find or remember each item that has been shared, as well as the users or groups with whom an item is shared, Windows Vista includes a Shared By Me Saved Search specifically dedicated to displaying files and folders directly shared out by the current user.

=== Windows Search ===
Windows Explorer showing the Search Pane for advanced query customization

Windows Vista introduces a Windows Search Index and platform that supersedes both the Indexing Service and Windows Desktop Search to unify platform search and to provide enhanced capabilities and greater rapidity of results; it was developed after the postponement of WinFS and introduces features originally touted as benefits of that platform, such as content indexing, incremental searching, and property stacking. Windows Search appears in the Common Item Dialog (Open/Save dialog boxes), the Control Panel, the Start menu, in various applications, and in Windows Explorer. Windows Search by default indexes user profiles (excluding AppData). Windows Search uses IFilters — the same interface used by Microsoft Exchange Server, SharePoint, and SQL Server — to extract, index, and scan file format contents; it similarly uses Property Handlers to read and modify properties. For non-indexed queries, Windows Search in Windows Vista uses the same IFilters that are used for indexing, which offers more consistent results between indexed and non-indexed searches, as well as the ability of non-indexed queries to discover and display results for contents and properties — a feature that was unavailable in previous versions of Windows.

Windows Search uses a default query syntax referred to as the Advanced Query Syntax (AQS), which uses boolean operators (AND, OR, NOT) to disambiguate the parameters of queries for contents, items, and properties; an advanced search interface for constructing queries in place of AQS is available. With Windows Vista, Windows Search also includes an optional natural language search syntax called Natural Query Syntax (NQS) that enables queries such as "documents modified today", "e-mail from holly sent this week", "music by Mozart", and "videos of family created December 2007". Additionally, Windows Search SQL Syntax, which enables developers to issue SQL clauses and statements for queries is fully supported in Windows Vista.

Windows Vista out of the box includes six Saved Searches: Recent Documents, Recent E-mail, Recent Pictures and Videos, Recently Changed, and Shared By Me. Users can create custom Saved Searches, customize preexisting ones, and build new Saved Searches on preexisting ones; when results of the previous Saved Search change, all Saved Searches that match the criteria will display the new results.

=== Windows Sidebar ===
Windows Gadgets

Windows Sidebar is an interface that hosts Microsoft Gadgets, which are small applications designed for a particular purpose. Windows Sidebar is positioned rightward on the desktop, though users can place it leftward or detach gadgets to the desktop. Windows Vista includes Calendar, Clock, Contacts, CPU Meter, Currency Conversion, Feed Headlines, Notes, Picture Puzzle, Slide Show, Stocks, and Weather gadgets. Microsoft hosted a Web gallery for users to download and install additional gadgets.

Gadgets are written with a combination of DHTML, JScript, and VBScript, and are individually packaged as GADGET files. A single gadget on the Windows Sidebar can also optionally be hosted at Windows Live or on Windows SideShow devices.

=== Live File System (UDF Packet Writing) ===
Windows Vista introduced native support for packet writing on optical media, using the Universal Disk Format (UDF) file system. This feature, known as Live File System, makes writeable optical media act like flash storage by letting users incrementally add, modify, move and delete files on recordable and rewriteable optical media such as CD-R, CD-RW, DVD±R, DVD±RW, BD-R and BD-RE.

While the preceding Windows XP only supported reading UDF versions of up to 2.01 inside Windows Explorer, and relied on third-party software such as InCD for packet writing file operations, Windows Vista natively supports all UDF versions ranging up to UDF 2.60, used for BD-R. Live File System is supported with UDF version 1.50 and higher.

=== Default Programs ===
A common issue in previous Windows versions was that competing applications doing common tasks each tried to associate themselves as the default for a certain file type using their own custom user interface. The default application information for a particular file type was stored in the registry on a per-machine basis, resulting in applications changing another user's default program when one user's defaults were changed and each application querying several different registry values when launched. In Windows Vista onwards, file type associations and protocol handlers can be set on a per-user basis using the new Default Programs API, meaning default programs for file types and tasks can be different for each individual user. There is an API for calling a common user interface so applications no longer need to maintain their own file association UI. The Default Programs API gives applications a programmatic way to check for and discover other default applications, restore a single or all registered defaults, query for the owner of a specific default file association/protocol, launch the Default Programs UI for a specific application or clear all per user associations. Applications only need to registered at install time to be part of Default Programs.

=== Windows Flip and Flip 3D ===
Windows Flip 3D

Windows Vista Home Premium, Business, Ultimate, and Enterprise support Windows Flip, which displays a dynamic thumbnail of each open window—instead of an application icon for each window—on a Windows Aero glass surface and replaces the Alt+Tab ↹ interface of previous versions of Windows; and Windows Flip 3D, which enables users to flip through a cascading stack of open windows by pressing ⊞ Win+Tab ↹; releasing these keys selects the nearest application window. Users can retain Flip 3D after releasing the keyboard keys by pressing Ctrl in addition to ⊞ Win and Tab ↹. Pressing the ⇧ Shift key will flip through the stack of open windows in reverse. Flip 3D can also be scrolled with the scroll wheel of a mouse. Unlike Alt+Tab ↹ in previous versions of Windows, both Flip and Flip 3D allow users to switch to the desktop itself.

Alt+Tab ↹ in previous versions of Windows arranges open windows in the Z-order. In Windows Vista, when Windows Aero is enabled and there are multiple windows open, only the first several windows are arranged in the Z-order while the remaining are listed in alphabetical order to make it easier to switch to the desired window.

Taskbar buttons in Windows Vista when Windows Aero is enabled also display a dynamic thumbnail of each window when the user hovers over them with the mouse cursor; when a video in an open window is playing, for example, the thumbnail on the taskbar will display the live video.

=== Windows Ultimate Extras ===
Windows Ultimate Extras are optional features, which include BitLocker and Windows Marketplace enhancements, games, Multilingual User Interface packages, Windows DreamScene dynamic wallpapers, and Windows sound schemes that are accessible from Windows Update in Windows Vista Ultimate.

=== Other Shell improvements ===
- A new user profile namespace is introduced for better management of storage by providing intuitive names and simplified storage paths (for example, C:\Documents and Settings\User\My Documents of Windows XP maps to C:\Users\User\Documents in Windows Vista). The My prefix for special folders in the system (i.e., My Computer, My Documents, My Music, My Pictures, and My Videos) is removed. The former Application Data folder structure of Windows XP, which was used by applications to store per-user data is also replaced by a single AppData folder containing three subfolders (Roaming, Local, and LocalLow) in Windows Vista; previous user profiles did not logically sort data in the former structure, which made it difficult to determine per-computer or per-user data.
- Add to Quick Launch is a new context menu command for application shortcuts.
- Adornments now appear in the Shell for photos and videos; photos have instant camera paper borders and videos have film reels.
- An error message ("The specified device name is invalid") now appears when the user attempts to use a reserved name for a folder or file.
- Application shortcuts have Shell overlay icons to indicate the default application that is assigned to open them.
- AutoPlay supports Blu-ray, HD DVD, Super Video CD, and Video CD, and AutoPlay itself is now a per-device setting.
- Column headers in the Details icon view mode include new context menu options to Size Column to Fit for a single selected column and Size All Columns to Fit for all available columns, which automatically adjust column sizes to the length of the longest value; these options are in addition to the keyboard shortcut to automatically size all columns to fit (Ctrl and +) that was available in previous versions of Windows.
- Common Item Dialog supersedes the Common File Dialog of previous Windows versions, and introduces new features such as access to item metadata, the ability to search for items, and CTRL+A to select all of a filename.
- Computer (formerly My Computer) displays a Windows logo on the icon of the volume containing the Windows installation to indicate that it belongs to the current Windows session.
- Context menu commands to Copy as path for selected files and Open Command Prompt window here for selected folders are introduced; shortcuts also have a context menu option (Open file location) to open the physical locations of their targets.
- Date and Time has been rewritten in Windows Vista and allows two additional clocks to be displayed on the clock icon of the taskbar; the time from other time zones can also be shown. Daylight saving time details are on the calendar, and users can browse specific days, months, or years.
- Dialog boxes now display their status on the taskbar; only windows showed their status on the taskbar in previous versions of Windows.
- Disk Cleanup now includes handlers for cleaning setup logs, system error memory dumps, and Windows thumbnail caches.
- Folder relocation of files on Desktop on every user account is now possible. Same goes to other folders specific to every user account, such as Downloads, Music, Pictures, and Videos.
- Games (also known as the Games Explorer) is a central location to access, manage, and view installed games and related settings.
- Hide File Names is a new context menu option for folders that predominantly include photos and videos.
- Icons include a border target when Windows Aero, Windows Vista Basic, or Windows Vista Standard is enabled to make it easier to open the application or file; users previously had to click the icons themselves.
- If a folder does not include a visible item, Windows Explorer informs the user that the folder is empty (This folder is empty); this behavior is consistent with search operations in both previous versions of Windows (Search is complete. There are no results to display) and in Windows Vista where Windows Explorer does not find items that match a query (No items match your search).
- Improvements to the Windows C++ common and standard controls.
- Information bars appear under the Command Bar in Windows Explorer to provide alerts and options for problem resolution when users perform operations such as browsing My Network Places when not connected to a network (This computer is not connected to a network. Click to connect...) or searching across locations that have not been indexed by Windows Search (Searches might be slow in non-indexed locations. Click to add to Index...).
- JPEG files can be natively set as the desktop wallpaper without using Active Desktop (which is no longer supported); the aspect ratio of JPEG files is now maintained properly when they are set as the desktop wallpaper.
- Multiple files can be renamed consecutively by pressing F2 to rename one file then Tab ↹ to rename a subsequent file; pressing ⇧ Shift with Tab ↹ will change focus to a preceding file. In previous versions of Windows, users had to press F2 then ↵ Enter then → to rename a subsequent file (or ← to rename a preceding file) each time to rename multiple files consecutively.
- Performing a search in Windows Explorer creates a virtual page of the search results to which users can navigate; the search results are added to both the address bar and the Back stack.
- Pressing ⊞ Win with the number corresponding with the location of the first nine applications on the Quick Launch toolbar will open that application (e.g., ⊞ Win and 1 will open the first application).
- Rotate clockwise and Rotate counterclockwise context menu options for selected images — previously available only in the Filmstrip and Thumbnails icon view modes in Windows XP — are available in all icon view modes in Windows Vista.
- Shell overlay icons and sound events for the new User Account Control feature are available.
- Task Dialogs and associated APIs aim to address issues with older message boxes and intend to facilitate the creation of custom dialog boxes.
- Taskbar and Start Menu Properties now provides a single location to enable or disable the Clock, Network, Power, and Volume system icons in the notification area of the Windows taskbar; system icons now take precedence over application icons.
- The address bar in Windows Explorer, and the Run dialog box now support CTRL+A, which allows users to select and copy, cut, delete, or paste over all text in the text field.
- The address bar includes new context menu options: Copy Address, which copies the currently active node in the breadcrumb path as a pastable file system object; Copy Address as Text, which copies the address itself as plain text; and Edit Address, which displays the full address in the address bar and automatically selects the entire path.
- The Arrange Icons By context menu option in Windows XP and earlier releases of Windows has been replaced by individual context menu options to Group By, Sort By, and Stack By. Within each of these context menus, users can now change whether items are grouped (or sorted or stacked) in ascending or descending directions; a checkbox now appears next to the name of the property by which items have been grouped or sorted. If a property by which users want to manage items is unavailable in one of these context menus, there is a new More... option that adds properties to both the list that appears and to the column headers in the Shell. The previous Arrange Icons By only included a Show Icons in Groups option with no way to change the group order (or add properties by which to group) from the context menu.
- The Compatibility tab in Windows Explorer includes new options to Disable desktop composition, Disable display scaling on high DPI settings, and Run this program as an administrator. There are new options to run programs in compatibility mode for either Windows XP (Service Pack 2) or Windows Server 2003 (Service Pack 1).
- The Navigation Pane in Windows Explorer will now automatically scroll horizontally to display the name of a folder when the user expands a node in the folder tree; users do not have to scroll.
- The Previous Versions Property Sheet Shell extension can restore all previous versions of a file by utilizing Shadow Copy, a storage backup technology introduced in Windows Server 2003.
- The Security tab that displays NTFS audit, owner, and permission features for files and folders now appears even when the option to use the new Sharing Wizard, which enables simple file sharing is enabled. Previously, in Windows XP, the tab was disabled if simple file sharing (Use simple file sharing (Recommended)) was enabled.
- The Summary tab and the Version tab of Windows XP have been combined into a single Details tab; the new tab allows editing the same metadata as the Details Pane if a Property Handler for the selected file type is installed. A new Remove Properties and Personal Information option can remove metadata from a selected item(s).
- The template for shortcuts has changed for the first time since Windows 95. New shortcuts now first include the filename with a shortcut designation appended to the name (Filename - Shortcut) instead of the shortcut designation taking precedence over the filename (Shortcut to Filename); the new template enables better file sorting and supports localization efforts.
- The Tile Horizontally and Tile Vertically context menu options introduced in Windows 95 for buttons on the taskbar belonging to open windows have been renamed as Show Windows Stacked and Show Windows Side by Side, respectively, in Windows Vista.
- There is a context menu option to exit Windows Explorer (Exit Windows Explorer) when holding CTRL and ⇧ Shift and clicking on the Start menu with the secondary mouse button; in Windows XP, the user had to open the Start menu, select Turn Off Computer (or Shutdown if using the classic logon prompt), and click the Cancel button on the Turn off computer dialog while pressing and holding CTRL+ALT+⇧ Shift.
- Tooltips now appear for all drag and drop file operations. In one example, when selecting a file and dragging it to another volume, a tooltip under the mouse cursor informs that dropping this file on the target volume will create a copy of this file. In another example, when selecting and dragging multiple files, the number of files appears under the mouse cursor to provide numerical feedback indicating the number of files on which the user will be performing file operations.
- When attempting to delete a file, the Delete File dialog box now displays a thumbnail representing the file to be deleted, as well as the metadata of the file; in previous versions of Windows only the filename was displayed in this dialog box.
- When renaming a file with the F2 key or with the Rename context menu option while file extensions are visible, only the filename is selected, which prevents users from accidentally changing the file extension or from having to manually select only the filename.
- When searching for drivers with Device Manager it is possible to specify that subfolders of a selected location should be searched.
- When the taskbar is resized, it is now possible to open the Start menu by clicking under the Start button; as per Fitts's law this allows users to continue to open the Start menu by clicking the furthest corner of the taskbar (as though the Start button is still there) regardless of how large the taskbar is.

== New and upgraded applications ==
=== Backup and Restore Center ===
Backup and Restore Center replaces NTBackup and operates in two modes: (a) Backup or restore selected files or (b) Complete PC Backup. If using Complete PC Backup, incremental snapshots are stored on external hard disk or optical media, and the complete system can be restored to protect against hardware failure or severe software damage. Automatic scheduling of file backups is not available in Windows Vista Home Basic and Complete PC Backup is not available in Windows Vista Home Basic or Windows Vista Home Premium.

=== Games ===
FreeCell, Hearts, Minesweeper, Solitaire, and Spider Solitaire of previous Windows versions are rewritten in DirectX to take advantage of Windows Vista's new graphical capabilities. InkBall from Windows XP Tablet PC Edition is also included, and has been updated to support being played with a mouse. New games include Chess Titans, Mahjong Titans, and Purble Place. Microsoft Tinker and Texas Hold 'Em Poker are available as Windows Ultimate Extras in Windows Vista Ultimate. All Windows Vista games support XInput, which allows them to be played with an Xbox 360 Controller. There is intrinsic support for Xbox 360 controllers and peripherals in Windows Vista.

=== Internet Explorer 7 ===
Internet Explorer 7 adds support for tabbed browsing, Atom, RSS, internationalized domain names, a search box, a phishing filter, an anti-spoofing URL engine, fine-grained control over ActiveX add-ons, thumbnails of all open tabs in a single window (called Quick Tabs), page zoom, and tab groups. Tab groups make it possible to open a folder of Favorites in tabs with a single click. Importing bookmarks and cookies from other web browsers is also supported. Additionally, there is now proper support for PNG images with transparency as well as improvements and fixes to CSS and HTML rendering. The Windows RSS Platform offers native RSS support, with developer APIs.

On Windows Vista, Internet Explorer operates in a special "Protected Mode", which runs the browser in a security sandbox that has no access to the rest of the operating system or file system, except the Temporary Internet Files folder. This feature aims to mitigate problems whereby newly discovered flaws in the browser (or in ActiveX controls hosted inside it) allowed hackers to subversively install software on the user's computer (typically spyware). Internet Explorer 7 in Windows Vista also exclusively supports Advanced Encryption Standard (AES) key lengths up to 256 bits outlined in RFC 3268 and certificate revocation checking using Online Certificate Status Protocol. The TLS implementation has also been updated to support extensions as outlined in RFC 3546, most notable of which is Server Name Indication support.

Internet Explorer 7 additionally features an update to the WinInet API. The new version has better support for IPv6, and handles hexadecimal literals in the IPv6 address. It also includes better support for Gzip and deflate compression, so that communication with a web server can be compressed and thus will require less data to be transferred. Internet Explorer Protected Mode support in WinInet is exclusive to Windows Vista and later Windows versions.

=== Internet Information Services 7 ===
The redesigned management console of Internet Information Services 7.0

Internet Information Services (IIS) 7.0 introduces a refactored, modular architecture with integrated .NET Framework extensibility; the new version includes a completely modular Web server engine with optional modules to offer specific features—instead of being a monolithic server that automatically includes all features. The administration interface additionally is rewritten and uses the Microsoft Management Console for asynchronous operation and other features, with ASP.NET configuration being more prominent. ISAPI extension development is deprecated in favor of APIs that enable the new module architecture. All Web server configuration information is stored in XML files instead of in the metabase. A global configuration file stores default settings of the server, with optional additions from Web document roots and subdirectories optionally augmenting or supplanting these. There are additional new features dedicated to backward compatibility, deployment, performance, and security.

=== Magnifier ===
Magnifier in Windows Vista can magnify the vector-based content of Windows Presentation Foundation applications without blurring the magnified content—it performs resolution-independent zooming—when the Desktop Window Manager is enabled; the release of .NET Framework 3.5 SP1 in 2008 removes this capability when installed in Windows Vista.

Magnifier can now be docked to the bottom, left side, right side, or top of the screen. Microsoft also introduced the Magnification API so that developers can build solutions that magnify portions of the screen or that apply color effects.

=== Paint ===
Paint

Paint features a new set of colors in the color box; the location of the color box is also now near both the menu bar and the tool box (instead of near the status bar) to facilitate access to colors when accessing editing commands. All of the icons for commands on the tool box have been updated for the first time since Windows 95. All commands for shapes in the tool box now include line thickness options (in addition to the opacity options available in previous versions of Paint).

The File menu includes a new Set As Background (Stretched) option. The Edit menu includes a new Invert Selection feature. The Image menu features a new Crop capability. The Undo command in Paint now supports undoing ten of the previous consecutive actions (previous versions of Paint allowed only up to three consecutive actions to be undone).

The Magnifier in Paint has been updated and now allows users to incrementally zoom in to or zoom out of an image (previously, it only allowed 1x, 2x, 6x, and 8x fixed zoom percentage values); scrolling with the mouse scroll wheel to zoom is supported when hovering over the magnifier in the tool box. Similarly, there are new custom zoom percentages (12.5, 25, and 50) listed in the Custom submenu in Zoom on the View menu.

Finally, Paint in Windows Vista saves in the JPEG format by default, which facilitates the writing of metadata properties to an image such as specifying an author of an image (the version of Paint in Windows XP saved images as 24-bit bitmap (BMP) files by default).

=== Snipping Tool ===
Snipping Tool (previously available in Microsoft Experience Pack for Tablet PC in Windows XP Tablet PC Edition 2005) is included in the Windows Vista Home Premium, Business, Enterprise, and Ultimate editions as a screenshot application that allows taking screenshots of entire screens, freeform areas, open application windows, and rectangular selections, which can then be annotated by using a mouse or stylus, saved as an image or Web archive, or sent as an attachment in an email message.

When an image is saved as a Web archive or sent as an attachment in an email client that supports inline HTML, Snipping Tool can add hyperlinks to the resource captured in the screenshot if the application provides information on how to obtain them (for example, a Web browser can preserve the context of a Web page of which Snipping Tool is used to take a screenshot so that the recipient of the screenshot can access the hyperlinks referenced by the Web page).

=== Sound Recorder ===
Sound Recorder has been rewritten for Windows Vista and supports recording clips of any length—in previous versions of Windows the recording length was limited to 60 seconds, with subsequent additions limited by available system memory—as long as hard disk space is available. Sound Recorder now supports saving recordings as WMA files, with options in the new Common Item Dialog to write metadata properties when saving recordings.

=== Task Manager ===
Task Manager, although visually similar to the version in Windows XP has seen significant feature introductions in Windows Vista. Columns in pages now feature arrows and colors when they are selected to visually indicate the sort direction and selected column. Memory consumption in the status bar is now displayed as a percentage value instead of as separate commit charge values. A new Services page displays all services and service details including descriptions, names, process IDs, groups, and statuses, with Go To Process, Start Service, and Stop Service context menu options. The following changes were also made to Task Manager pages of previous versions of Windows:

- The Applications page includes a new Create Dump File context menu option
- The Performance page includes an option to open the new Resource Monitor, and now shows memory usage (in addition to page file usage) and system uptime
- The Processes page includes new Command Line, Description, Data Execution Prevention, Image Path Name, and Virtualization column options
  - The Processes page also includes new Open File Location and Properties context menu options

=== Windows Calendar ===
Windows Calendar is an integrated calendar application in Windows Vista that supports creating, managing, publishing, sharing, and subscribing to calendars across the Internet or across network shares; the popular iCalendar format is among its supported calendar formats.

=== Windows Contacts ===
Windows Contacts replaces the Windows Address Book as a new unified contact and personal information management application; it stores contacts as CONTACT files based on XML and features extensibility APIs and options for integration with other applications and devices. Legacy WAB files and the CSV and VCF open standards are also supported.

=== Windows DVD Maker ===
Windows DVD Maker is a DVD creation application. Applications can also pass an XML file to DVD maker for authoring and burning.

=== Windows Fax and Scan ===
Windows Fax and Scan in the Business, Ultimate, and Enterprise editions of Windows Vista is a faxing and scanning application that supports sending and receiving faxes, faxing or emailing scanned documents, and forwarding faxes as email attachments. It replaces the optional Fax Services component of Windows XP. Users can preview documents before faxing them and directly fax or email documents after scanning.

=== Windows Mail ===
Windows Mail replaces Outlook Express and introduces fundamental revisions to the storage architecture and security mechanisms. It is intended to be a significantly more secure offering than Outlook Express by including Bayesian spam filtering, email attachment blocking, the junk email filtering functionality of Microsoft Exchange, the new Phishing Filter of Internet Explorer 7, and top-level domain blocking functionality that was previously exclusive to Microsoft Outlook. Windows Mail additionally eliminates the single point of failure design of Outlook Express.

=== Windows Media Center ===
Windows Media Center in Windows Vista is available in the Home Premium and Ultimate editions and has been upgraded significantly from Windows XP Media Center Edition 2005. The interface has undergone a revision where each button in the main menu includes sections that, when selected, provide submenus that extend horizontally outward. These submenu options are presented as a grid, with each providing album art for tracks, or thumbnails for photos, television shows, and videos; while playing, live content is overlaid in the background during user interface navigation. Examples of other new features of Windows Media Center include:

- .NET 2.0 Common Language Runtime (CLR)
- A new Movies and DVD button that lists all the movies on the local hard drive and the currently inserted DVD
- A new Tasks button that provides access to jobs such as configuring a Media Center Extender
- CableCARD support
- Native DVD/MPEG-2 support
- Support for high-definition (HD) content
- Support for two dual-tuner cards
- Windows SideShow support

=== Windows Media Player 11 ===
Windows Media Player 11 features a revised interface. Media Library is now presented without the category trees which were prominent in the earlier versions. Rather, on selecting the category in the left pane, the contents appear on the right, in a graphical manner with thumbnails—a departure from textual presentation of information. Missing album art can be added directly to the placeholders in the Library itself (though the program re-renders all album art imported this way into 1:1 pixel ratio, 200x200 resolution JPEG images). Views for Music, Pictures, Video and Recorded TV are separate and can be chosen individually from the navigation bar. Entries for Pictures and Video show their thumbnails. Search has been upgraded to be faster.

Windows Media Player 11 in Windows Vista Home Premium and Ultimate Editions supports MMC-5 driver commands for the AACS content protection scheme, as well as the UDF file system which is required for Blu-ray and HD DVD playback. However, not all the codecs required for playback of HD DVD and Blu-ray video are included. VC-1 and the MPEG-2 video decoders, as well as the Dolby Digital (AC-3) 5.1 audio decoder are included in Windows Vista Home Premium and Ultimate Editions. H.264 video and other multichannel surround sound audio standards still require third party decoders.

Other features of Windows Media Player 11 include:

- Windows Media Format 11 Runtime: Updates the earlier Windows Media runtime to support low bitrate WMA Professional Audio and includes a VC-1 compliant WMV Advanced Profile codec. Support for ripping audio CDs to WAV and WMA 10 Pro formats is also added.
- Stacking: Stacking allows graphical viewing of how many albums exist in a specific category of music. The pile appears larger as the category contains more albums.
- Search improvements: Searches and displays results as characters are being entered, without waiting for Enter key to be hit. Results are refined based on further characters that are typed.
- Disc spanning: CD Burning now shows a graphical bar showing how much space will be used on the disc. It splits a burn list onto multiple discs in case the content does not fit on one disc.
- Global Status: Global status shows a broad overview of what the player is doing. The information presented include status information regarding buffering, ripping, burning and synchronization.
- Synchronization: Improved synchronization features for loading content onto PlaysForSure-compatible portable players. Windows Media Player 11 supports reverse-synchronization, by which media present on the portable device can be replicated back to the PC.
- Media Sharing: which allows one to share their Media library and make it accessible to other PCs running Windows Vista or later Windows versions, Xbox 360, or networked Media Receivers via UPnP. Content (Music, Pictures, Video) can be streamed to and from Universal Plug and Play (UPnP) AV enabled devices such as the PS3, Xbox 360, and Roku SoundBridge. This includes DRM protected PlaysForSure content.
- URGE: The new music store from Microsoft and MTV networks is integrated with the player. As of October 28, 2007, the URGE service was discontinued when it merged with Rhapsody; the link in Windows Media Player 11 remains but is no longer functional. In order to use Rhapsody, a separate download is required.

Certain features of Media Sharing in Windows Media Player 11 are only available in Windows Vista and later. For example, Windows Media Player 11 on Windows Vista can also connect to remote media libraries through DLNA; this is not available in the Windows XP version.

=== Windows Meeting Space ===
Windows Meeting Space is a peer-to-peer collaboration application and the replacement for NetMeeting. Users can share applications or desktops with other users on the local network, or over the Internet. Distribution and collaborative editing of documents, as well as passing notes to other participants is supported. Windows Meeting Space automatically discovers other local users using People Near Me, a feature that uses WS-Discovery.

=== Windows Movie Maker ===
Windows Movie Maker now supports Direct3D effects and transitions, editing and outputting HD video, importing recorded DVR-MS format videos, as well as burning output movies on a CD. Beginning with the Home Premium edition of Windows Vista, it can import HDV video from camcorders and output video to Windows DVD Maker for creating DVD-Video discs. New effects and transitions have been added. Movie Maker of Windows Vista requires GPU hardware acceleration, pixel shader, and WDDM hardware support; however, Movie Maker from Windows XP was released by Microsoft as a download for Windows Vista users whose computers cannot run the new version.

=== Windows Photo Gallery ===
Windows Photo Gallery

Windows Photo Gallery is a photo and video library management application that replaces Windows Fax and Scan of Windows XP and consists of a toolbar for photo commands, a navigation tree for dates, folders, ratings, and tags, and a control bar with options to change view modes, navigate between photos, rotate photos, start slide shows, and zoom photos; preview thumbnails appear when users hover over photos with the mouse cursor. Users can adjust color, exposure, saturation, temperature, and tint, crop or resize, lessen red-eye, rotate, print, rate, or tag photos. Users can view tagged photos by clicking dates, ratings, and tags in the navigation tree; pressing and holding the CTRL while clicking multiple tags across metadata types enables advanced queries such as “all photos of either Steve or Frank, taken in July, with a rating of at least 3 stars.” Users can add tags to files by dragging photos to tags listed in the navigation tree, and tags themselves can also be arranged in a hierarchical tree structure. RAW photos are supported and users can view any format for which there is an installed Windows Imaging Component codec. The photo import process now relies on the Media Transport Protocol, which introduces capabilities such as importing photos from mobile phones or wireless cameras.

Slideshows with fade, pan, and zoom transitions can be created and burnt to a DVD; additional effects are in Windows Vista Home Premium and Windows Vista Ultimate. A Slide Show Screen Saver option can create screensavers based on photos with specific ratings or tags ("all four-star photos") with an option to exclude specific tags ("all four-star photos tagged beach, but not tagged private"). An Online Print Wizard enables users to order prints of photos over the Internet for delivery to an address by mail or for local pickup at a nearby store. The Photo Print Wizard now supports borderless prints, international photo sizes, larger paper sizes, and includes more templates than were available in Windows XP.

=== Windows Update ===
Windows Update is now a native client application in Windows Vista; in previous versions of Windows it was web application that had to be accessed from a web browser. Automatic Updates can now automatically download and install Recommended updates (in addition to High Priority updates that could be automatically downloaded and installed in previous versions of Windows).

The prompt that appears when an update is installed that requires a machine to be restarted has been revised, with new options to postpone an operating system restart by 10 minutes, by 1 hour, or by 4 hours. Users can still postpone a restart indefinitely, but an update may cause a machine to be restarted within 15 minutes if no action for postponement is taken. In Windows XP, users could only repeatedly dismiss the prompt to restart, or allow the machine to be restarted within 15 minutes of the appearance of the prompt.

=== WordPad ===
WordPad now supports the Text Services Framework, on which Windows Speech Recognition is implemented, which allows users to dictate text into the application.

== Security and safety features ==
Microsoft announced a Trustworthy Computing initiative in 2002; Windows Vista was built with the underlying ethos of "secure by default, secure in deployment, secure by design" to make it a more secure operating system than its predecessors. All existing code was refactored and reviewed in an effort to improve security. Some of the most discussed and most significant introduced security features include Address Space Layout Randomization, BitLocker, Device Installation Control, Mandatory Integrity Control, Parental Controls, User Account Control, User Interface Privilege Isolation, and Windows Defender. Windows Firewall is significantly improved, with the new ability to block and filter outbound connections, as well as to provide granular configuration policies.

== Management and administration ==
Windows Vista introduces new features and technologies that aim to assist and facilitate system management. Some notable changes include a complete replacement for NTLDR; a rewritten Task Scheduler; enhanced Remote Desktop functionality including per-application sessions; and the Windows Imaging Format, a new image-based deployment format. There is also a range of new Group Policy settings for the new features.

== Graphics ==
=== Desktop Window Manager ===
The Desktop Window Manager is the new windowing system which handles the drawing of all content to the screen. Instead of windows drawing directly to the video card's memory buffers, contents are instead rendered to back-buffers (technically Direct3D surfaces), which are then arranged in the appropriate Z-order, then displayed to the user. This drawing method uses significantly more video memory than the traditional window-drawing method used in previous versions of Windows, which only required enough memory to contain the composite of all currently visible windows at any given time. With the entire contents of windows being stored in video memory, a user can move windows around the screen smoothly, without having "tearing" artifacts be visible while the operating system asks applications to redraw the newly visible parts of their windows. Other features new to Windows Vista such as live thumbnail window previews and Flip 3D are implemented through the DWM.

Users need to have a DirectX 9 capable video card to be able to use the Desktop Window Manager. Machines that can't use the DWM fall back to a "Basic" theme, and use screen drawing methods similar to Windows XP.

Desktop Window Manager is included in all editions of Windows Vista except the Starter edition.

=== DirectX ===
Windows Vista includes Direct3D 10, which adds scheduling and memory virtualization capabilities to the Windows graphics subsystem, as well as support for unified pixel shaders, geometry shaders, and vertex shaders. Significant is the elimination of "capability bits" of previous versions of Direct3D, which previously were used to indicate which features were active on the graphics hardware; instead, Direct3D 10 defines a minimum standard of hardware capabilities that must be supported for a system to be regarded as compatible with the new infrastructure. Microsoft's goal with this design was to create an environment for developers, designers, and gamers that would assure them that their input would be rendered exactly the same across all compatible graphics cards.

Direct3D 10 is able to display certain graphics up to eight times more quickly than Direct3D 9 because of the new Windows Display Driver Model (WDDM) and incorporates Microsoft's High-Level Shader Language 4.0. However, Direct3D 10 is not backward compatible with previous versions; the same game will not be compatible with both Direct3D 10 and Direct3D 9 or earlier, which means that developers who wish to use Direct3D 10 and provide support for older versions of Windows would need to create separate versions of the same game in order to target both Windows Vista and earlier versions. Windows Vista does, however, contain a backward compatible implementation of Direct3D 9. Direct3D 10 functionality also requires the WDDM and new graphics hardware, which will allow the hardware to be pre-emptively multithreaded—to allow multiple threads to use the GPU in turns—and provide paging operations to graphics memory.

Direct3D 9 in Windows Vista is called Direct3D 9Ex and also uses the WDDM, which allows Direct3D applications to access new features available in Windows Vista including advanced gamma functions, cross-process shared surfaces, device removal management, managed graphics memory, prioritization of resources, and text anti-aliasing.

=== DirectX Video Acceleration 2.0 ===
Windows Vista introduces DirectX Video Acceleration (DXVA) 2.0 which enhances the implementation of the video pipeline and adds a host of other DDIs, including a Capture DDI for video capture. The DDIs it shares with DXVA 1.0 are also enhanced with support for hardware acceleration of more operations. Also, the DDI functions are directly available to callers and need not be mediated by the video renderer. As such, pipelines for simply decoding the media (without rendering) or post-processing and rendering (without decoding) can also be created; these features require support for the WDDM.

Windows Vista also introduces a new video renderer, available as both a Media Foundation component and a DirectShow filter, called the Enhanced Video Renderer (EVR). EVR is designed to work with Desktop Window Manager.

DXVA 2.0 supports only Enhanced Video Renderer as the video renderer on Windows Vista. DXVA integrates with Media Foundation and allows DXVA pipelines to be exposed as Media Foundation Transforms (MFTs). Even decoder pipelines or post-processing pipelines can be exposed as MFTs, which can be used by the Media Foundation topology loader to create a full media playback pipeline. DXVA 1.0 is emulated using DXVA 2.0.

=== Imaging ===
Windows Imaging Component (WIC) is a new extensible imaging framework that allows applications supporting the framework to automatically get support of installed codecs for graphics file formats. It was later ported back to Windows XP SP3.

Windows Presentation Foundation applications also automatically support the installed image codecs. Developers can write their own image codecs for their specific image file formats. Windows Vista ships with the BMP, GIF, HD Photo, JPEG, PNG, and TIFF codecs. Codecs for RAW image formats used generally by high-end digital cameras are also supported in this manner. Windows Explorer and Windows Photo Gallery are based on this new framework and can thus view and organize images in any format for which the necessary codecs are installed.

HD Photo (previously known as Windows Media Photo) is a new photographic still graphics file format that supports features such as high-dynamic-range imaging, lossy as well as lossless compression, up to 32-bpp fixed or floating point representation, transparency, RGB, CMYK and n-channel color spaces, Radiance RGBE, embedded ICC color profiles, multiple images per file and support for Exif and XMP metadata formats. It is the preferred image format for XPS documents.

=== Color management ===
Windows Vista features Windows Color System (WCS), a platform for color management. Its goal is to obtain color consistency across various software and hardware including cameras, monitors, printers, and scanners. Different devices interpret the same colors differently, according to their software and hardware configurations. As a result, they must be properly calibrated to reproduce colors consistently across different devices. WCS aims to make this process of color calibration automatic and transparent, as an evolution of ICC Color Profiles.

Windows Color System is based on a completely new Color Infrastructure and Translation Engine (CITE). It is backed up by a new color processing pipeline that supports bit-depths more than 32 bits per pixel, multiple color channels (more than 3), alternative color spaces and high-dynamic-range coloring, using a technology named Kyuanos developed by Canon. The color processing pipeline allows device developers to add their own gamut mapping algorithm into the pipeline to customize the color response of the device. The new pipeline also uses floating point calculations to minimize round-off losses, which are inherent in integer processing. Once the color pipeline finishes processing the colors, the CITE engine applies a color transform according to a color profile, specific to a device to ensure the output color matches to what is expected.

WCS features explicit support for LCD as well as CRT monitors, projectors, printers, and other imaging devices and provides customized support for each. WCS uses color profiles according to the CIE Color Appearance Model recommendation (CIECAM02), defined using XML, to define how the color representation actually translates to a visible color. ICC V4 color profiles are also supported. Windows Photo Gallery and Photo Viewer, Windows Imaging Component, the HD Photo format, XPS print path and XPS documents all support color management.

== Mobile computing ==
Significant changes have been made for mobile computing with Windows Vista.

=== Pen features ===
==== Cursors and cursor feedback ====
Windows Vista introduces cursors for pens, with a pen cursor appearing at all times to show where a tap will be performed while users hover over the screen with a pen. Cursors for tap, double tap, and hold operations visually indicate specific events: a subtle ring appears after a tap; two subtle rings appear after a double tap; and hold operations display a chord that will form a circle to indicate that users can release the pen to perform the equivalent of a secondary mouse button press. A circle appears on the screen when users press a pen button to inform them of a successful button press.

==== Flicks and other gestures ====
Flicks are gestures allowing users to stroke the pen in a certain direction to perform a specific action. Flicking upward and downward perform scroll operations with inertia (physics and weight are simulated, with the scroll distance proportional to the pressure of the pen), while flicking leftward or rightward navigates back and forth. Flicks are exposed as two categories: Navigational (Back, Forward, Page Up, and Page Down) and Editing (Copy, Paste, Delete, Undo) and can be performed in the eight major compass directions or configured to perform custom actions. Pen panning allows users to drag pages upward or downward in Internet Explorer 7 and Microsoft Office 2007.

==== Tablet PC Input Panel improvements ====
The Tablet PC Input Panel of Windows XP Tablet PC Edition is updated to support AutoComplete in address bars, context disambiguation, and handwriting personalization. Context determines the user's intent when writing: in an address bar, handwritten text is automatically identified as a URL, but the same text is identified as prose when written in a body of text. Password fields selected with the pen now display the On-Screen Keyboard instead of the Tablet PC Input Panel to prevent observers from viewing handwritten passwords. The recognizer can now identify and adapt to specific handwriting, with an optional Automatic Learning feature improving recognition accuracy on an ongoing basis through regular use; users can also manually correct characters, words, or submit handwritten ink samples, and a training interface allows users to practice with sentences. The recognizer also uses harvesting to analyzes users' corpus and disambiguate based on context and terminology. An optional data collection feature allows handwritten text samples to be sent to Microsoft to improve handwriting recognition. The Tablet PC Input Panel itself can now be resized, and it supports scratch-out gestures with which whereby users can quickly delete a word or phrase by scribbling instead of erasing with the back of a pen.

==== Touch input ====
There is intrinsic support for single touchscreen-based interaction in addition to support for active pens; its inclusion in Windows Vista is the first time intrinsic support is available to Windows. A new, optional touch pointer interface simulates a computer mouse by displaying a two-button computer mouse on the screen, which users can drag to move the mouse cursor or touch its buttons to perform primary or secondary mouse click operations, especially where targets are too small to comfortably touch with a finger. A panning hand feature of Internet Explorer 7 allows users to scroll webpages with a finger. Flick gestures available to pens can also be used with fingers.

==== Windows Explorer checkboxes ====
Checkboxes appear alongside files in Windows Explorer on a tablet PC so that users can more easily select and manage files with a pen, which is useful especially on tablets without a keyboard where holding the CTRL key or the ⇧ Shift key to select multiple files is not possible. Checkbox targets in Windows Explorer also extend beyond the checkboxes themselves to facilitate the selection of multiple files with a pen.

=== External display improvements ===
Windows Vista aims to simplify the detection, configuration, and installation of external displays by introducing a standardized setup procedure and interface with the new WDDM, which enables hot plug detection and alerts the new Transient Multimon Manager (TMM) for external display configuration when one is connected. In previous versions of Windows, installation routines varied due to hardware configurations such as function keys, manufacturer requirements, and manufacturer-specific interfaces. The TMM also saves user preferences for external displays so these are automatically restored when the same display is reconnected at some different time or location. The improvements intend to enable an experience that provides the ease of use of plug and play peripherals.

Windows Vista also allows applications to respond to changing monitor environments. When a secondary display with an active window is disconnected, for example, open windows on the secondary display will be moved back to the primary display so that they remain visible.

==== Network Projection ====
Windows Vista introduces a new and standardized setup procedure for the detection and connection of projectors. Networked projectors can discovered automatically or users can manually enter addresses of the projectors to which Windows Vista should connect. Windows Vista automatically suppresses all notifications and sleep mode during a presentation; users can also change backgrounds, screensavers, and volumes, while preferences can by saved to specific displays and restored when the display is reconnected. Devices Profile for Web Services simplifies installation and management of networked devices. Windows Vista Service Pack 1 enhances network projection by temporarily resizing the desktop to accommodate custom projector resolutions.

=== Power management ===
==== Changes to power schemes ====
Previous versions of Windows included six different power schemes. Windows Vista aims to simplify power management by presenting concise names for power schemes and by reducing the number of default schemes to the following three schemes: Balanced, which is enabled by default and adjusts performance and power consumption based on user interaction; Power Saver, which reduces performance by favoring energy efficiency by disabling desktop composition when on battery life, reducing display brightness, processor performance, and the time until the screen is dimmed or the time until sleep; and Maximum Performance, which favors performance regardless of user activity.

Microsoft said these changes are a result of confusion caused by schemes in previous versions of Windows: power schemes were incomprehensible, indiscoverable, and numerous, which confused and intimidated users, who would often select a specific scheme to conserve battery life, for example, which would instead maximize performance at the expense of battery life.

Power schemes are now GUIDs, and users can now create, export, or import schemes. Schemes change based on user context — when a PC is plugged in, it can use High Performance, but when it is unplugged, it can automatically switch to Power Saver. Applications can now register to be informed of changes to power schemes to scale back features (such as graphical details or network polls) so that bandwidth and/or battery life is preserved.

==== Granular power option configuration options ====
Windows Vista introduces many new granular control policies for power schemes that were unavailable in previous versions of Windows. Users can change CPU cooling and CPU state options, idle timers for operating system events, network adapter settings, PCI Express link state settings, and USB selective suspension options. USB selective suspension additionally is supported among a wider range of class drivers than in previous Windows versions, with support for Bluetooth classes, portable devices, and video classes. Windows Vista also includes new power options for indexing items, playing video, and streaming media; users can prioritize battery life or efficiency of any of the aforementioned activities.

Windows Vista SP1 introduces the ability for the operating system to turn off periodic VSync interrupt counting of CPU cycles when the screen is not being refreshed from new graphics or mouse activity, which can result in significant energy savings.

==== Sleep ====
Sleep is the default power suspension state (instead of shut down) for desktop computers and mobile PCs such as laptops and it replaces the standby feature of previous versions of Windows. To ensure that the transition to sleep is reliable, Windows Vista does not allow sleep to be vetoed. Vetoing the sleep process, which prevents Windows from going to sleep, was a significant source of power transition failures in previous versions of Windows and which eventually resulted in user distrust of sleep due to data loss, decreased battery life, and overheated PCs. Early in the development of Windows Vista, Microsoft indicated it would allow sleep to be vetoed, but subsequent investigations revealed that veto was frequently abused by developers. Administrators can still enable veto with group policy.

==== Hybrid sleep ====
Hybrid sleep combines sleep and hibernation by saving memory contents to a hibernation file on disk and entering sleep. Normally, if a PC loses power when asleep, it will lose all contents in memory, but with hybrid sleep, the system can still restore these from the hibernation file. By default, it is enabled on desktop computers, which usually do not include an uninterruptible power supply, but disabled on laptops as they usually include another power source such as a battery. Hybrid sleep requires a WDDM driver.

==== Away Mode ====
Windows Vista introduces Away Mode power management functionality that suppresses all display and sound emissions while allowing a PC to remain operational for recording or streaming. Away Mode allows a PC to behave like a consumer electronics device, but Microsoft emphasizes that it does not replace sleep mode despite its power saving benefits.

Away Mode was previously released in Windows XP Media Center Edition 2005 Update Rollup 2, but it was conceived for Windows Vista in 2004 when it was codenamed "Longhorn".

==== Windows HotStart ====
Windows HotStart (formerly Windows Direct and also known as Direct Media Mode) enables opening an application in response to the press of a button or event such as a remote control press. HotStart enables appliance-like availability—a PC that automatically starts a media player after boot functions as a DVD player. Original equipment manufacturers (OEMS) can customize HotStart hardware implementation and functionality. Users can customize HotStart through the Windows Registry; instead of launching a multimedia application a user can, for example, configure a button to launch an e-mail application. HotStart can result in power savings because it enables direct and immediate access to desired content.

=== Other mobility enhancements ===
- Ink Analysis APIs of the Windows Presentation Foundation intrinsically support handwriting and inking, and can recognize handwritten shapes and text, which are converted to vector-graphics rendered as the shape or text that was intended to be drawn. An update for Windows XP Tablet PC Edition containing Ink Analysis API support was released.
- InkBall, Sticky Notes, and Windows Journal from Windows XP Tablet PC Edition are included in Windows Vista.
- Media Transfer Protocol over USB or TCP/IP is supported. The Platform Update for Windows Vista introduces support over Bluetooth.
- Sync Center is a single location for creating or managing sync partnerships for Offline Files, mobile phones, PDAs, smart phones, and portable media players.
- Windows Mobility Center centralizes information and settings relevant to mobile computers including display brightness, power options, presentation settings, and sync settings. OEMs can add further capabilities to control their specific features.
- Windows Mobile Device Center centralizes management and synchronization of Windows Mobile devices, with options to sync appointments, contacts, email, notes, tasks, and other content such as photos. Outlook 2000 and Windows Mobile 2003 and later are supported.
- Windows Portable Devices has been introduced to communicate with attached media and all portable devices. The Platform Update for Windows Vista backports several features introduced in Windows 7.
- Windows ReadyDrive introduces support for hybrid drives and other flash memory caches such as Intel Turbo Memory, which offer conservation of battery life and decreased times for booting and hibernation. When a hybrid hard drive is installed, a new NV Cache property tab appears in the device properties within the Device Manager.
- Windows SideShow enables viewing information such as appointments, RSS feeds, and sports results on an auxiliary display even when a PC is powered down.
- WinUSB, a generic user-mode USB driver with client API for simple devices that are accessed by only one application at a time is native to Windows Vista.

== Fonts ==
The Fonts Control Panel now allows fonts to be filtered, grouped, and sorted. Icons for fonts can be scaled. Users can now arrange fonts based on font type, and view the full file system paths of installed font locations.

Windows Vista includes new Western (Latin, Greek and Cyrillic) ClearType typefaces: Calibri (sans-serif), Cambria (serif), Candara (sans-serif), Consolas (monospaced), Constantia (serif), Corbel (sans-serif), Segoe UI, Segoe Script (script), and Segoe Print (casual). Additionally, four new Asian fonts have been added: Malgun Gothic (Korean), Meiryo (Japanese), Microsoft JhengHei (Traditional Chinese), and Microsoft YaHei (Simplified Chinese).

== Language support ==
Windows Vista is a language-independent operating system, unlike previous versions of Windows, and it supports additional languages when compared with previous versions. The Enterprise and Ultimate editions of Windows Vista allow additional languages to be installed with Multilingual User Interface. Users can now install and select non-English languages on a per-user basis—instead of a per-device basis—to transform the entire Shell and application user interfaces to that language. Unicode font and character support have also been improved. Windows Vista also supports "custom locales", allowing users to create their own locale data for use in applications using the Locale Builder tool.

== See also ==
- Windows Server 2008
- New features by Windows version:
  - XP
  - Vista
  - 7
  - 8
  - 10
  - 11
- Removed features by Windows version:
  - XP
  - Vista
  - 7
  - 8
  - 10
  - 11
