= Windows Ultimate Extras =

Optional features of the Ultimate edition of Windows Vista

Windows Ultimate Extras were optional features offered by Microsoft to users of the Ultimate edition of Windows Vista and were accessible via Windows Update. Ultimate Extras replaced the market role of Microsoft Plus!, a product sold for prior consumer releases of Microsoft Windows. According to Microsoft's Barry Goffe, the company's goal with Ultimate Extras was to delight customers who purchased the Ultimate edition of Windows Vista, the most expensive retail edition of the operating system. Windows Ultimate Extras were only available as part of Windows Vista Ultimate, before being removed entirely during the Windows 7 development cycle. As a result, all installed extras were removed during an upgrade from Windows Vista to Windows 7.

== Contents ==
Microsoft released a total of nine Ultimate Extras for Windows Vista Ultimate users.

=== BitLocker and EFS enhancements ===
The BitLocker Drive Preparation Tool utility and the Secure Online Key Backup utility were among the first Ultimate Extras to be made available, and were released to coincide with the general retail availability of Windows Vista. BitLocker Drive Preparation Tool prepares the hard drive to be encrypted with BitLocker, whereas Secure Online Key Backup enabled users to create an off-site backup of their BitLocker recovery password and Encrypting File System recovery certificates at Digital Locker, as part of the Windows Marketplace digital distribution platform. Secure Online Key Backup was rendered inoperable after Digital Locker shut down in August 2009.

=== Multilingual User Interface language packs ===
Unlike previous versions of Windows, Windows Vista is language-independent; the language architecture separates the language resources for the user interface from the binary code of the operating system. Support for installing additional languages is included in the Enterprise and Ultimate editions of Windows Vista. In the Ultimate edition, the functionality is made available through Windows Update as Ultimate Extras.

Microsoft stated that 16 languages were made available on January 30, 2007. The company released the remaining language packs on October 23, 2007 for a total of 35 language packs. An additional 36th language pack version is available for Windows Vista that supports traditional Chinese characters with the Hong Kong Supplementary Character Set.

=== Microsoft Tinker ===
Microsoft Tinker is a puzzle game made available on September 23, 2008 where players must navigate a robot through mazes and obstacles. A total of 60 levels are included, and players can create their own levels with a level editor.

=== Hold 'Em ===
The Hold 'Em game

Hold 'Em (formerly Windows Poker as in build 5284) is a poker card game released on January 29, 2007 that is fundamentally similar to Texas hold 'em. Hold 'Em allows users to play against up to five computer players and up to three levels of difficulty, and also allows users to customize aspects of the game's appearance; the game relies on DirectX to produce hardware-accelerated 3D animations and effects. For optimal performance, Hold 'Em requires a computer with a Windows Experience Index rating of 2.0 or higher.

According to Paul Thurrott, Hold 'Em was originally intended to be bundled alongside the premium games—Chess Titans, Mahjong Titans, and InkBall—included by default with the Home Premium and Ultimate editions of Windows Vista, but was instead made an Ultimate Extra because of its gambling themes.

=== Windows sound schemes ===
A total of three sound schemes for Windows Vista were released: Ultimate Extras Glass, Ultimate Extras Pearl, and Microsoft Tinker. The first two were made available on April 22, 2008, while the latter was made available on September 23, 2008 to coincide with the release of Microsoft Tinker. The Glass and Pearl sound schemes are similar to the Default sound scheme included in Windows Vista as they were also developed in accordance with the Windows Aero graphical user interface.

=== Windows DreamScene ===
Windows DreamScene enables MPEG and WMV videos to be displayed as desktop backgrounds. Windows Aero must be enabled for Windows DreamScene due to requiring the Desktop Window Manager to display videos on the desktop.

=== Proposed extras ===
Proposed Windows Ultimate Extras included a downloadable podcast creator, a game performance optimizer, digital publications, exclusive access to online content, themes, Windows DVD Maker templates, and Windows Movie Maker effects and transitions; the Group Shot photo application developed by Microsoft Research shown by Bill Gates at the Consumer Electronics Show in 2007 also was once considered.

Despite not being considered Windows Ultimate Extras, the Windows Ultimate Extras team additionally released two wallpapers (Start and Strands) based on the Windows Vista Ultimate retail packaging and intended for Windows Vista Ultimate users; the wallpapers were made available in three different display resolutions.

== Critical reception ==
Reaction to Windows Ultimate Extras was mixed. While Microsoft was praised for creating a value proposition for users who purchased the most expensive edition of Windows Vista, the company was criticized for its delays during delivery of updates, perceived lack of quality of delivered updates, and a lack of transparency regarding their development. Early on, there were concerns that the features would not live up to users' expectations. The company announced several Ultimate Extras in January 2007, but only a fraction of these were released five months later. After months without an official update since January, Microsoft released an apology for the delays, stating that it intended to ship the remaining features before the end of summer of 2007. The delays between consecutive updates and months of silence had led to speculation that the development team within the company responsible for the features had been quietly disbanded.

When Microsoft announced its intentions to release the remaining Ultimate Extras and released an apology for delays, Paul Thurrott stated that the company had "dropped the ball" with the features. Ed Bott wrote that Ultimate Extras were "probably the biggest mistake Microsoft made with Vista," and that the company would downplay the Ultimate edition of Windows 7 as a result. Bott would later list them among his "decade's worth of Windows mistakes."

Microsoft was also criticized for changing the description for Ultimate Extras within the operating system. The offerings slated to be made available were initially described as "cutting-edge programs," "innovative services," and "unique publications," but the description for the features within the Control Panel applet was later modified in Windows Vista Service Pack 1 to be more modest; this was interpreted as an attempt made by the company to avoid fulfilling prior expectations.

Emil Protalinski of Ars Technica wrote that the Ultimate edition of Windows Vista "would have looked just fine without the joke that is 'Ultimate Extras'" and that the features were supposed to provide an incentive for consumers to purchase that edition, "not give critics something to point and laugh at." In the second part of his review of Windows 7, Peter Bright of Ars Technica wrote that "the value proposition of the Ultimate Extras was nothing short of piss-poor." Bright would later criticize Microsoft's decision not to release Internet Explorer 10 for Windows Vista, but would go on to state that this was still "not as bad as the Ultimate Extras farce."

== See also ==
- List of games included with Windows
- Windows Anytime Upgrade
- Windows Easy Transfer
- Windows Vista editions
