= List of games included with Windows =

List of bundled Windows video games

Solitaire has been included in every version of Windows since Windows 3.0, except Windows 8 and 8.1, where it was instead made available as a free download via Windows Store.

Video games have been included in versions of the Microsoft Windows line of operating systems since Windows 1.0, all published by Microsoft. Some games that appeared in Microsoft Entertainment Pack and Microsoft Plus! were later included in subsequent versions of Windows. Microsoft Solitaire has been included in every version of Windows since Windows 3.0, except Windows 8 and 8.1. The latest version of Windows, Windows 11, includes Microsoft Solitaire Collection and Surf.

== History ==
Microsoft planned to include games when developing Windows 1.0 in 1983–1984. Pre-release versions of Windows 1.0 initially included another game, Puzzle, but it was scrapped in favor of Reversi, based on the board game of the same name. Reversi was included in Windows versions up to Windows 3.1. Solitaire was developed in 1988 by the intern Wes Cherry. The card deck was designed by Susan Kare, who was known for her icon designs for the original Macintosh.

Microsoft intended Solitaire to "soothe people intimidated by the operating system," and at a time when many users were still unfamiliar with graphical user interfaces, the game helped introduce them to using a mouse, including the drag-and-drop technique required to move cards. According to Microsoft telemetry, Solitaire was among the three most-used Windows programs and FreeCell was seventh, ahead of productivity-based applications such as Microsoft Word and Excel. Lost business productivity from employees playing Solitaire became a common concern because the game was included in Windows by default.

FreeCell was introduced as a bundled game in Windows NT 3.1. The game was available for Windows 3.1 because it was included in Win32s installations to verify that the 32-bit thunking layer had been installed correctly.

The Microsoft Hearts Network was included with Windows for Workgroups 3.1 as a showcase for NetDDE technology, allowing multiple players to play simultaneously across a computer network. This technology led to the inclusion of several online multiplayer titles under the Internet brand in Windows Me, XP, and 7, alongside other online multiplayer titles. Support for Internet games for Windows Me and XP ended on July 31, 2019, and for Windows 7 on January 22, 2020. 3D Pinball for Windows – Space Cadet is a version of the "Space Cadet" pinball table from the 1995 video game Full Tilt! Pinball.

In Minesweeper for Windows Vista and 7, the game includes an alternate "Flower Garden" style alongside the default "Minesweeper" style. This was due to controversy over the game's original land mine theme, which was considered potentially insensitive; the "Flower Garden" style was used as the default theme in "sensitive areas".

Several third-party games, such as Candy Crush Saga and Disney Magic Kingdoms, have been included as advertisements in the Start menu in Windows 10 and may also be installed automatically by the operating system. Windows 11 includes the Xbox app, which allows users to access the PC Game Pass video game subscription service. Additionally, versions of the Microsoft Edge browser from 2020 onward, bundled with Windows 10 and 11, include the Surf game.

=== Microsoft Casual Games ===
Beginning in 2012 with the release of Windows 8, updated versions of previously bundled games were released under the Microsoft Casual Games brand, along with several new games. Except for Solitaire Collection, which is included in Windows 10 and 11, these games are not included with Windows and are instead available as free, ad-supported downloads in Microsoft Store.

Premium monthly and annual subscriptions are available that remove advertisements and offer several gameplay benefits. Reviewers have criticized this as a way to "nickel and dime" users, because previous versions of Solitaire and other bundled games did not include advertisements or paid subscriptions. The Windows games under the Microsoft Casual Games banner include:

- Solitaire Collection
- Minesweeper
- Mahjong
- Ultimate Word Games
- Treasure Hunt
- Sudoku
- Jigsaw

== Included games ==
Games included with Microsoft Windows releases
	1.0	2.0 and 2.1	3.0	3.1	NT 3.1, NT 3.5 and NT 3.51	95	NT 4.0	98	2000	Me	XP	Vista	7	8 and 8.1	10	11
Reversi	Yes	Yes	Yes	(Note: Included in the Driver Library)	No	No	No	No	No	No	No	No	No	No	No	No
Solitaire	—N/a		Yes	Yes	Yes	Yes	Yes	Yes	Yes	Yes	Yes	Yes	Yes	(Note: As part of Microsoft Solitaire Collection)	Yes	Yes
Minesweeper	—N/a			Yes	Yes	Yes	Yes	Yes	Yes	Yes	Yes	Yes	Yes	(Note: Available as a free download via Windows Store.)	(Note: Available as a free download via Microsoft Store.)	Maybe
Hearts	—N/a			(Note: Only included with Windows for Workgroups 3.1)	No	Yes	No	Yes	No	Yes	Yes	Yes	Yes	No	No	No
FreeCell	—N/a				Yes	Yes	Yes	Yes	Yes	Yes	Yes	Yes	Yes	Maybe	Yes	Yes
Hover!	—N/a					(Note: Only included with CD-ROM version)	No	No	No	No	No	No	No	No	No	No
3D Pinball for Windows – Space Cadet	—N/a						Yes	No	Yes	Yes	(Note: Not included in the IA-64 version.)	No	No	No	No	No
Internet Backgammon	—N/a									Yes	Maybe	No	Yes	No	No	No
Internet Checkers	—N/a									Yes	Maybe	No	Yes	No	No	No
Internet Hearts	—N/a									Yes	Maybe	No	No	No	No	No
Internet Reversi	—N/a									Yes	Maybe	No	No	No	No	No
Internet Spades	—N/a									Yes	Maybe	No	Yes	No	No	No
Spider Solitaire	—N/a									Yes	Yes	Yes	Yes	Maybe	Yes	Yes
Inkball	—N/a										(Note: Only included with Tablet PC Edition)	(Note: Only included with Home Premium, Business, Ultimate, and Enterprise editions)	No	No	No	No
Purble Place	—N/a											Yes	Yes	No	No	No
Mahjong	—N/a											Maybe	(Note: Only included with Home Premium, Professional, Ultimate, and Enterprise editions)	Maybe	Maybe	Maybe
Chess Titans	—N/a											Maybe	Maybe	No	No	No
Tinker	—N/a											(Note: Only included with Ultimate edition)	No	No	No	No
Hold 'Em	—N/a											Maybe	No	No	No	No
Solitaire Collection	—N/a													Maybe	Yes	Yes
Surf	—N/a														(Note: Included via the Microsoft Edge browser from 2020 onward)	Yes (Note: Included via the Microsoft Edge browser)

== Microsoft Touch Pack for Windows 7 ==
Microsoft Touch Pack for Windows 7 is a collection of six multi-touch optimized video games that shows off the capabillities of a touch-screen, these six games are:

- Microsoft Surface Collage
- Microsoft Surface Globe
- Microsoft Surface Lagoon
- Microsoft Blackboard
- Microsoft Rebound
- Microsoft Garden Pond

This game pack is only compatible with Windows 7.

== See also ==
- Microsoft Entertainment Pack
- List of Microsoft Windows components
