= WinUSB =

Generic USB driver by Microsoft

- Developer: Microsoft
- Operating system: Microsoft Windows
- Type: Device driver
- Website: learn.microsoft.com/en-us/windows-hardware/drivers/usbcon/introduction-to-winusb-for-developers

WinUSB is a generic USB driver provided by Microsoft for their operating systems starting with Windows Vista but which is also available for Windows XP. It is aimed at simple devices that are accessed by only one application at a time (for example instruments like weather stations, devices that only need a diagnostic connection or for firmware upgrades). It enables the application to directly access the device through a simple software library. The library provides access to the pipes of the device. WinUSB exposes a client API that enables developers to work with USB devices from user-mode. Starting with Windows 7, USB MTP devices use WinUSB instead of the kernel mode filter driver.

== Characteristics ==
WinUSB does not require the knowledge to write a driver and allows quicker development.

Only one application can access the device at a time. It does not support isochronous transfers prior to Windows 8.1. It also does not support USB Reset (as requested by DFU protocol for example)

== WCID ==
A WCID device, where WCID stands for "Windows Compatible ID", is a USB device that provides extra information to a Windows system, in order to facilitate automated driver installation and, in most circumstances, allow immediate access. WCID allows a device to be used by a Windows application almost as soon as it is plugged in, as opposed to the usual scenario where a USB device that is neither HID nor Mass Storage requires end-users to perform a manual driver installation. As such, WCID can bring the 'Plug-and-Play' functionality of HID and Mass Storage to any USB device (that sports a WCID aware firmware). WCID is an extension of the WinUSB Device functionality.

== Other solutions ==
One solution is the use of a predefined USB device class. Operating systems provide built-in drivers for some of them. The most widely used device class for embedded devices is the USB communications device class (CDC). A CDC device can appear as a virtual serial port to simplify the use of a new device for older applications.

Another solution is UsbDk. UsbDk supports all device types including isochronous and provides simpler way for device access acquisition that does not involve INF files creation and installation. UsbDk is open source, community supported and works on all Windows versions starting from Windows XP.

If the previous solutions are inappropriate, one can write a custom driver. For newer versions of Microsoft Windows, it can be done using the Windows Driver Foundation.
