= Windows Vista =

2006 Microsoft operating system version

- Version of the Windows NT operating system

- Screenshot of Windows Vista, showing its desktop, taskbar, Start menu, Windows Sidebar, Welcome Center, and glass effects of Windows Aero
- Developer: Microsoft
- Working state: No longer supported
- Source model: Closed-source; Source-available (through Shared Source Initiative)
- Released to manufacturing: November 8, 2006; 20 years ago
- General availability: January 30, 2007; 19 years ago
- Final release: Service Pack 2 with May 2019 security update (6.0.6003.20512) / May 14, 2019; 7 years ago
- Marketing target: Consumer and Business
- Update method: Windows Update; Windows Server Update Services (WSUS); System Center Configuration Manager (SCCM)
- Supported platforms: IA-32, x86-64
- Kernel type: Hybrid (NT)
- Userland: Windows API, NTVDM, .NET Framework, SUA
- License: Proprietary commercial software
- Preceded by: Windows XP (2001)
- Succeeded by: Windows 7 (2009)
- Official website: Windows Vista (archived at the Wayback Machine)

Support status
- Mainstream support ended on April 10, 2012. Extended support ended on April 11, 2017.

Windows Vista is a major release of the Windows NT operating system developed by Microsoft. It was the direct successor to Windows XP, released five years earlier, which was then the longest time span between successive releases of Microsoft Windows. It was released to manufacturing on November 8, 2006, and over the following two months, it was released in stages to business customers, original equipment manufacturers (OEMs), and retail channels. On January 30, 2007, it was released internationally and was made available for purchase and download from the Windows Marketplace; it is the first release of Windows to be made available through a digital distribution platform.

Development of Windows Vista began in 2001 under the codename "Longhorn"; originally envisioned as a minor successor to Windows XP, it gradually included numerous new features from the then-next major release of Windows codenamed "Blackcomb", after which it was repositioned as a major release of Windows, and it subsequently underwent a period of protracted development that was unprecedented for Microsoft. Most new features were prominently based on a new presentation layer codenamed Avalon, a new communications architecture codenamed Indigo, and a relational storage platform codenamed WinFS — all built on the .NET Framework; however, this proved to be untenable due to incompleteness of technologies and ways in which new features were added, and Microsoft reset the project in 2004. Many features were eventually reimplemented after the reset, but Microsoft ceased using managed code to develop the operating system.

New features of Windows Vista include a graphical user interface and visual style referred to as Windows Aero; a content index and desktop search platform called Windows Search; new peer-to-peer technologies to simplify sharing files and media between computers and devices on a home network; and new multimedia tools such as Windows DVD Maker. Windows Vista included version 3.0 of the .NET Framework, allowing software developers to write applications without traditional Windows APIs. There are major architectural overhauls to audio, display, network, and print sub-systems; deployment, installation, servicing, and startup procedures are also revised. It is the first release of Windows built on Microsoft's Trustworthy Computing initiative and emphasized security with the introduction of many new security and safety features such as BitLocker and User Account Control.

General reception to Windows Vista was mixed; while the design quality and addition of new features earned positive reception, Windows Vista was the subject of frequent criticism and negative press review. Criticism of Windows Vista focused on driver, peripheral, and program incompatibility; digital rights management; excessive authorization from the new User Account Control; inordinately high system requirements when contrasted with Windows XP; its protracted development; longer boot time; and more restrictive product licensing. Windows Vista deployment and satisfaction rates were consequently lower than those of Windows XP, and it is considered a market failure; however, its use surpassed Microsoft's pre-launch two-year-out expectations of achieving 200 million users (with an estimated 330 million users by 2009). Two service packs were released, in 2008 and 2009 respectively. Windows Vista was succeeded by Windows 7 in 2009, and on October 22, 2010, Microsoft ceased retail distribution of Windows Vista; OEM supply ceased a year later. Mainstream support for Windows Vista ended on April 10, 2012, and extended support ended on April 11, 2017.

== Development ==
Microsoft began work on Windows Vista, known at the time by its codename "Longhorn", in May 2001, five months before the release of Windows XP. It was originally expected to ship in October 2003 as a minor step between Windows XP and "Blackcomb", which was planned to be the company's next major operating system release. Gradually, "Longhorn" assimilated many of the important new features and technologies slated for Blackcomb, resulting in the release date being pushed back several times in three years. In some builds of Longhorn, their license agreement said "For the Microsoft product codenamed 'Whistler'". Many of Microsoft's developers were also re-tasked to build updates to Windows XP and Windows Server 2003 to strengthen security. Faced with ongoing delays and concerns about feature creep, Microsoft announced on August 27, 2004, that it had revised its plans. For this reason, Longhorn was reset to start work on componentizing the Windows Server 2003 Service Pack 1 codebase, and over time re-incorporating the features that would be intended for an actual operating system release. However, some previously announced features such as WinFS were dropped or postponed, and a new software development methodology called the Security Development Lifecycle was incorporated to address concerns with the security of the Windows codebase, which is programmed in C, C++ and assembly. Longhorn became known as Vista in 2005. Vista in Spanish means view.

=== Longhorn ===
Desktop screenshot of Windows Longhorn build 4074, showing the Start menu, an early version of Windows Desktop Sidebar, Windows Explorer, and the Slate visual style

The early development stages of Longhorn were generally characterized by incremental improvements and updates to Windows XP. During this period, Microsoft was fairly quiet about what was being worked on, as their marketing and public relations efforts were more strongly focused on Windows XP, and Windows Server 2003, which was released in April 2003. Occasional builds of Longhorn were leaked onto popular file sharing networks such as IRC, BitTorrent, eDonkey and various newsgroups, and so most of what is known about builds before the first sanctioned development release of Longhorn in May 2003 is derived from these builds.

After several months of relatively little news or activity from Microsoft with Longhorn, Microsoft released Build 4008, which had made an appearance on the Internet around February 28, 2003. It was also privately handed out to a select group of software developers. As an evolutionary release over build 3683, it contained several small improvements, including a modified blue "Plex" theme and a new, simplified Windows Image-based installer that operates in graphical mode from the outset, and completed an install of the operating system in approximately one third the time of Windows XP on the same hardware. An optional "new taskbar" was introduced that was thinner than the previous build and displayed the time differently. The most notable visual and functional difference, however, came with Windows Explorer. The incorporation of the Plex theme made blue the dominant color of the entire application. The Windows XP-style task pane was almost completely replaced with a large horizontal pane that appeared under the toolbars. A new search interface allowed for filtering of results, searching for Windows help, and natural-language queries that would be used to integrate with WinFS. The animated search characters were also removed. The "view modes" were also replaced with a single slider that would resize the icons in real-time, in the list, thumbnail, or details mode, depending on where the slider was. File metadata was also made more visible and more easily editable, with more active encouragement to fill out missing pieces of information. Also of note was the conversion of Windows Explorer to being a .NET application.

Most builds of Longhorn and Vista were identified by a label that was always displayed in the bottom-right corner of the desktop. A typical build label would look like "Longhorn Build 3683.Lab06_N.020923-1821". Higher build numbers did not automatically mean that the latest features from every development team at Microsoft was included. Typically, a team working on a certain feature or subsystem would generate their working builds which developers would test with, and when the code was deemed stable, all the changes would be incorporated back into the main development tree at once. At Microsoft, several "Build labs" exist where the compilation of the entirety of Windows can be performed by a team. The name of the lab in which any given build originated is shown as part of the build label, and the date and time of the build follow that. Some builds (such as Beta 1 and Beta 2) only display the build label in the version information dialog (Winver). The icons used in these builds are from Windows XP.

At the Windows Hardware Engineering Conference (WinHEC) in May 2003, Microsoft gave their first public demonstrations of the new Desktop Window Manager and Aero. The demonstrations were done on a revised build 4015 which was never released. Several sessions for developers and hardware engineers at the conference focused on these new features, as well as the Next-Generation Secure Computing Base (previously known as "Palladium"), which at the time was Microsoft's proposed solution for creating a secure computing environment whereby any given component of the system could be deemed "trusted". Also at this conference, Microsoft reiterated their roadmap for delivering Longhorn, pointing to an "early 2005" release date.

=== Development reset ===
By 2004, it had become obvious to the Windows team at Microsoft that they were losing sight of what needed to be done to complete the next version of Windows and ship it to customers. Internally, some Microsoft employees were describing the Longhorn project as "another Cairo" or "Cairo.NET", referring to the Cairo development project that the company embarked on through the first half of the 1990s, which never resulted in a shipping operating system (though nearly all the technologies developed in that time did end up in Windows 95 and Windows NT). Microsoft was shocked in 2005 by Apple's release of Mac OS X Tiger. It offered a limited subset of features planned for Longhorn, in particular fast file searching and integrated graphics and sound processing, but appeared to have impressive reliability and performance compared to contemporary Longhorn builds. Most Longhorn builds had major Windows Explorer system leaks which prevented the OS from performing well, and added more confusion to the development teams in later builds with more and more code being developed which failed to reach stability.

In a September 23, 2005 front-page article in The Wall Street Journal, Microsoft co-president Jim Allchin, who had overall responsibility for the development and delivery of Windows, explained how development of Longhorn had been "crashing into the ground" due in large part to the haphazard methods by which features were introduced and integrated into the core of the operating system, without a clear focus on an end-product. Allchin went on to explain how in December 2003, he enlisted the help of two other senior executives, Brian Valentine and Amitabh Srivastava, the former being experienced with shipping software at Microsoft, most notably Windows Server 2003, and the latter having spent his career at Microsoft researching and developing methods of producing high-quality testing systems. Srivastava employed a team of core architects to visually map out the entirety of the Windows operating system, and to proactively work towards a development process that would enforce high levels of code quality, reduce interdependencies between components, and in general, "not make things worse with Vista". Since Microsoft decided that Longhorn needed to be further componentized, work started on builds (known as the Omega-13 builds, named after a time travel device in the film Galaxy Quest) that would componentize existing Windows Server 2003 source code, and over time add back functionality as development progressed. Future Longhorn builds would start from Windows Server 2003 Service Pack 1 and continue from there.

This change, announced internally to Microsoft employees on August 26, 2004, began in earnest in September, though it would take several more months before the new development process and build methodology would be used by all of the development teams. A number of complaints came from individual developers, and Bill Gates himself, that the new development process was going to be prohibitively difficult to work within.

=== As Windows Vista ===
By approximately November 2004, the company had considered several names for the final release, ranging from simple to fanciful and inventive. In the end, Microsoft chose Windows Vista as confirmed on July 22, 2005, believing it to be a "wonderful intersection of what the product really does, what Windows stands for, and what resonates with customers, and their needs". Notably, the name "Windows 7" had been considered, presumably because it could be regarded as the 7th major consumer-oriented Windows release. Group Project Manager Greg Sullivan told Paul Thurrott "You want the PC to adapt to you and help you cut through the clutter to focus on what's important to you. That's what Windows Vista is all about: "bringing clarity to your world" (a reference to the three marketing points of Vista—Clear, Connected, Confident), so you can focus on what matters to you". Microsoft co-president Jim Allchin also loved the name, saying that "Vista creates the right imagery for the new product capabilities and inspires the imagination with all the possibilities of what can be done with Windows—making people's passions come alive."

After Longhorn was named Windows Vista in July 2005, an unprecedented beta-test program was started, involving hundreds of thousands of volunteers and companies. In September of that year, Microsoft started releasing regular Community Technology Previews (CTP) to beta testers from July 2005 to February 2006. The first of these was distributed at the 2005 Microsoft Professional Developers Conference, and was subsequently released to beta testers and Microsoft Developer Network subscribers. The builds that followed incorporated most of the planned features for the final product, as well as a number of changes to the user interface, based largely on feedback from beta testers. Windows Vista was deemed feature-complete with the release of the "February CTP", released on February 22, 2006, and much of the remainder of the work between that build and the final release of the product focused on stability, performance, application and driver compatibility, and documentation. Beta 2, released in late May, was the first build to be made available to the general public through Microsoft's Customer Preview Program. It was downloaded over 5 million times. Two release candidates followed in September and October, both of which were made available to a large number of users.

At the Intel Developer Forum on March 9, 2006, Microsoft announced a change in their plans to support EFI in Windows Vista. The UEFI 2.0 specification (which replaced EFI 1.10) was not completed until early 2006, and at the time of Microsoft's announcement, no firmware manufacturers had completed a production implementation which could be used for testing. As a result, the decision was made to postpone the introduction of UEFI support to Windows; support for UEFI on 64-bit platforms was postponed until Vista Service Pack 1 and Windows Server 2008 and 32-bit UEFI would not be supported, as Microsoft did not expect many such systems to be built because the market was quickly moving to 64-bit processors.

While Microsoft had originally hoped to have the consumer versions of the operating system available worldwide in time for the 2006 holiday shopping season, it announced in March 2006 that the release date would be pushed back to January 2007 in order to give the company—and the hardware and software companies that Microsoft depends on for providing device drivers—additional time to prepare. Because a release to manufacturing (RTM) build is the final version of code shipped to retailers and other distributors, the purpose of a pre-RTM build is to eliminate any last "show-stopper" bugs that may prevent the code from responsibly being shipped to customers, as well as anything else that consumers may find troublesome. Thus, it is unlikely that any major new features would be introduced; instead, work would focus on Vista's fit and finish. In just a few days, developers had managed to drop Vista's bug count from over 2470 on September 22 to just over 1400 by the time RC2 shipped in early October. However, they still had a way to go before Vista was ready to RTM. Microsoft's internal processes required Vista's bug count to drop to 500 or fewer before the product could go into escrow for RTM. For most of the pre-RTM builds, only 32-bit editions were released.

On June 14, 2006, Windows developer Philip Su posted a blog entry which decried the development process of Windows Vista, stating that "The code is way too complicated, and that the pace of coding has been tremendously slowed down by overbearing process." The same post also described Windows Vista as having approximately 50 million lines of code, with about 2,000 developers working on the product. During a demonstration of the speech recognition feature new to Windows Vista at Microsoft's Financial Analyst Meeting on July 27, 2006, the software recognized the phrase "Dear mom" as "Dear aunt". After several failed attempts to correct the error, the sentence eventually became "Dear aunt, let's set so double the killer delete select all". A developer with Vista's speech recognition team later explained that there was a bug with the build of Vista that was causing the microphone gain level to be set very high, resulting in the audio being received by the speech recognition software being "incredibly distorted".

Windows Vista build 5824 (October 17, 2006) was supposed to be the RTM release, but a bug, where the OOBE hangs at the start of the WinSAT Assessment (if upgraded from Windows XP), requiring the user to terminate msoobe.exe by pressing Shift+F10 to open Command Prompt using either command-line tools or Task Manager prevented this, damaging development and lowering the chance that it would hit its January 2007 deadline.

Development of Windows Vista came to an end when Microsoft announced that it had been finalized on November 8, 2006, and was concluded by co-president of Windows development, Jim Allchin. The RTM's build number had also jumped to 6000 to reflect Vista's internal version number, NT 6.0. Jumping RTM build numbers is common practice among consumer-oriented Windows versions, like Windows 98 (build 1998), Windows 98 SE (build 2222), Windows Me (build 3000) or Windows XP (build 2600), as compared to the business-oriented versions like Windows 2000 (build 2195) or Server 2003 (build 3790). On November 16, 2006, Microsoft made the final build available to MSDN and Technet Plus subscribers. A business-oriented Enterprise edition was made available to volume license customers on November 30, 2006. Windows Vista was launched for general customer availability on January 30, 2007.

== New or changed features ==
New features introduced by Windows Vista are very numerous, encompassing significant functionality not available in its predecessors.

=== End-user ===
- Windows Aero is the new graphical user interface, which Jim Allchin stated is an acronym for Authentic, Energetic, Reflective, and Open. Microsoft intended the new interface to be cleaner and more aesthetically pleasing than those of previous Windows versions, and it features advanced visual effects such as blurred glass translucencies and dynamic glass reflections and smooth window animations. Laptop users report, however, that enabling Aero reduces battery life and reduces performance. Windows Aero requires a compositing window manager called Desktop Window Manager.
- Windows Shell offers a new range of organization, navigation, and search capabilities: Task Panes in Windows Explorer are removed, with the relevant tasks moved to a new command bar. The navigation pane can now be displayed when tasks are available, and it has been updated to include a new "Favorite Links" that houses shortcuts to common locations. An incremental search search box now appears at all times in Windows Explorer. The address bar has been replaced with a breadcrumb navigation bar, which means that multiple locations in a hierarchy can be navigated without needing to go back and forth between locations. Icons now display thumbnails depicting contents of items and can be dynamically scaled in size (up to 256 × 256 pixels). A new preview pane allows users to see thumbnails of items and play tracks, read contents of documents, and view photos when they are selected. Groups of items are now selectable and display the number of items in each group. A new details pane allows users to manage metadata. There are several new sharing features, including the ability to directly share files. The Start menu also now includes an incremental search box — allowing the user to press the ⊞ Win key and start typing to instantly find an item or launch a program — and the All Programs list uses a vertical scroll bar instead of the cascading flyout menu of Windows XP.
- Windows Search is a new content index desktop search platform that replaces the Indexing Service of previous Windows versions to enable incremental searches for files and non-file items, such as documents, emails, folders, programs, photos, tracks, and videos, including metadata like attributes, extensions, and filenames across compatible applications.
- Windows Sidebar is a translucent panel that hosts gadgets that display details such as feeds and sports scores on the Windows desktop; the Sidebar can be hidden and gadgets can also be placed on the desktop itself.
- Internet Explorer 7 is a significant revision over Internet Explorer 6 with a new user interface comprising additional address bar features, a new search box, enhanced page zoom, RSS feed functionality, and support for tabbed browsing (with an optional "quick tabs" feature that shows thumbnails of each open tab). Anti-phishing software is introduced that combines client-side scanning with an optional online service; it checks with Microsoft the address being visited to determine its legitimacy, compares the address with a locally stored list of legitimate addresses, and uses heuristics to determine whether an address's characteristics are indicative of phishing attempts. In Windows Vista, it runs in isolation from other applications (protected mode); exploits and malicious software are restricted from writing to any location beyond Temporary Internet Files without explicit user consent.
- Windows Media Player 11 is a significant update to Microsoft's Windows Media Player for playing and organizing photos, tracks, and videos. New features include an updated GUI for the media library, disc spanning, enhanced audio fingerprinting, instant search capabilities, item organization features, synchronization features, the ability to share the media library over a network with other Windows Vista machines, Xbox 360 integration, and Windows Media Center Extender support.
- Windows Defender is an antispyware program with several configurable options for real-time protection, with settings to block and notify of changes to browser, security, and Windows settings; prohibit startup applications; and view network-connected applications and their addresses; users can optionally report detected threats through the Microsoft Active Protection Service to help stop new threats.
- Backup and Restore Center allows for the creation of periodic backups and backup schedules, as well as recovery from previous backups; backups are incremental, storing only subsequent changes, which minimizes disk space usage. Windows Vista Business, Windows Vista Enterprise, and Windows Vista Ultimate additionally include Windows Complete PC Backup that allows system images to be created, and this feature can be started from Windows Vista installation media so that images can be restored to a new hard disk or new hardware or if a PC has experienced hardware failures and it cannot boot.
- Windows Calendar is a basic calendar application that integrates with Windows Contacts and Windows Mail; users can create appointments and tasks, publish calendars to the Internet or to a network share, receive reminders, send and receive calendar invitations, and share calendars with family members.
- Windows Mail is the successor to Outlook Express that includes significant feature additions (many of which were previously exclusive to Microsoft Outlook) and introduces fundamental revisions to the identification process, storage architecture, and security structure.
- Windows Photo Gallery replaces Windows Picture and Fax Viewer; it can acquire photographs from digital cameras; adjust photograph effects; burn photographs to optical media; create Direct3D-accelerated slideshows; and reduce red eye.
- Windows Media Center previously exclusive to Windows XP Media Center Edition is available in Windows Vista Home Premium and Windows Vista Ultimate; it has been updated with many new features such as support for CableCARD, DVD/MPEG-2, HD content, and two dual-tuner cards.
- Parental controls allow administrators to control and manage user activity (such as limiting the games that can be played or prohibiting specific contents of websites) of each standard user.
- Games including FreeCell, Hearts, Minesweeper, Solitaire, and Spider Solitaire have been rewritten in DirectX to take advantage of Windows Vista's new graphical capabilities. New games include Chess Titans (3D Chess), Mahjong Titans (3D Mahjong), and Purble Place (a collection consisting of a cake-creation game, a dress-up puzzle game, and a matching game oriented towards younger children). All in-box games in Windows Vista can be played with an Xbox 360 Controller.
- Games Explorer is the central location for installed games that displays details such as covers, developers, genres, installation dates, play times, publishers, ratings, and versions. Customizable tasks for games are available; metadata for installed games can be updated from the Internet. Game-related settings such as audio options, community support options, game controller options, firewall settings, and parental controls are displayed.
- Windows Mobility Center centralizes settings and statuses relevant to mobile computing such as battery life, connectivity status, display brightness, screen orientation, synchronization status, and volume level, and new options can be added by OEMs.
- Windows Fax and Scan allows machines to create, receive, scan, and send faxes, with the goal of making fax management identical to working with email; it is available in Windows Vista Business, Windows Vista Enterprise, and Windows Vista Ultimate.
- Windows Meeting Space replaces NetMeeting and relies on People Near Me and WS-Discovery to identify participants on the local subnet or across the Internet; users can give control of their computers to other participants, project their desktops, send messages to participants, and share files.
- Windows HotStart enables compatible computers to start applications directly from startup or resume by the press of a button, which allows them to function as a consumer electronics device such as a DVD player.
- Shadow Copy (originally only available in Windows Server 2003) creates copies of files and folders on a scheduled basis, allowing users to recover multiple versions of deleted or overwritten files or folders. Incremental changes are saved by shadow copies, which helps to limit the disk space in use.
- Windows Update is now a native client application; in previous versions of Windows, it was a web application that had to be accessed from a web browser. Automatic Updates can now automatically download and install Recommended updates (in addition to High Priority updates that could be automatically downloaded and installed in previous versions of Windows). The prompt that appears when an update is installed that requires a machine to be restarted has been revised, with new options to postpone an operating system restart indefinitely, by 10 minutes, by 1 hour, or by 4 hours (in Windows XP, users could only repeatedly dismiss the prompt to restart, or allow the machine to be restarted within 15 minutes of its appearance). Windows Defender definitions and Windows Mail spam filter are delivered through Windows Update.
- Windows SideShow delivers data such as messages and feeds from a personal computer to additional devices and displays, which makes data available in mobile scenarios; compatible devices could additionally transmit commands to applications, devices, or systems connected to a computer (e.g., a smart phone can control a presentation).
- Magnifier in Windows Vista can magnify the vector-based content of Windows Presentation Foundation applications without blurring the magnified content—it performs resolution-independent zooming—when the Desktop Window Manager is enabled; the release of .NET Framework 3.5 SP1 in 2008 removes this capability when installed in Windows Vista. Magnifier can now be docked to the bottom, left, right, or top of the screen. Microsoft also introduced the Magnification API so that developers can build solutions that magnify portions of the screen or that apply color effects.
- Windows Speech Recognition is new speech recognition functionality that enables voice commands for controlling the desktop; dictating documents; navigating websites; operating the mouse cursor; and performing keyboard shortcuts.
- Problem Reports and Solutions allows users to check for solutions to problems and receive solutions and additional information when it is available.
- Disk Management: the Logical Disk Manager in Windows Vista supports shrinking and expanding volumes.
- Reliability and Performance Monitor includes various tools for tuning and monitoring system performance and resources activities of CPU, disks, network, memory and other resources. It shows the operations on files, the opened connections, etc.
- Windows System Assessment Tool performs a series of assessments of a system's CPU, GPU, RAM, and HDD performance and assigns to the system a rating from 1.0 to 5.9; a system is rated during the out-of-box experience to determine if Windows Aero should be enabled.
- Windows Anytime Upgrade enabled users running a lower tier edition of Windows Vista to easily upgrade to a subsequent edition (e.g., to upgrade from Windows Vista Home Basic to Windows Vista Ultimate) by purchasing a license from an online merchant.
- Digital Locker Assistant simplified access to Windows Marketplace purchases for users to download applications and retrieve licenses; purchases were managed with Microsoft account credentials.
- Windows Ultimate Extras in Windows Vista Ultimate provided additional features such as BitLocker and EFS improvements that allowed users to back up their encryption keys; Multilingual User Interface packages; and Windows Dreamscene, which allowed using MPEG and WMV videos as the desktop background.

=== Core ===
Vista includes technologies such as ReadyBoost and ReadyDrive, which employ fast flash memory (located on USB flash drives and hybrid hard disk drives) to improve system performance by caching commonly used programs and data. This manifests itself in improved battery life on notebook computers as well, since a hybrid drive can be spun down when not in use. Another new technology called SuperFetch utilizes machine learning techniques to analyze usage patterns to allow Windows Vista to make intelligent decisions about what content should be present in system memory at any given time. It uses almost all the extra RAM as disk cache. In conjunction with SuperFetch, an automatic built-in Windows Disk Defragmenter makes sure that those applications are strategically positioned on the hard disk where they can be loaded into memory very quickly with the least physical movement of the hard disk's read-write heads.

As part of the redesign of the networking architecture, IPv6 has been fully incorporated into the operating system and a number of performance improvements have been introduced, such as TCP window scaling. Earlier versions of Windows typically needed third-party wireless networking software to work properly, but this is not the case with Vista, which includes more comprehensive wireless networking support.

For graphics, Vista introduces a new Windows Display Driver Model and a major revision to Direct3D. The new driver model facilitates the new Desktop Window Manager, which provides the tearing-free desktop and special effects that are the cornerstones of Windows Aero. Direct3D 10, developed in conjunction with major graphics card manufacturers, is a new architecture with more advanced shader support, and allows the graphics processing unit to render more complex scenes without assistance from the CPU. It features improved load balancing between CPU and GPU and also optimizes data transfer between them. WDDM also provides video content playback that rivals typical consumer electronics devices. It does this by making it easy to connect to external monitors, providing for protected HD video playback, and increasing overall video playback quality. For the first time in Windows, graphics processing unit (GPU) multitasking is possible, enabling users to run more than one GPU-intensive application simultaneously.

At the core of the operating system, many improvements have been made to the memory manager, process scheduler and I/O scheduler. The Heap Manager implements additional features such as integrity checking in order to improve robustness and defend against buffer overflow security exploits, although this comes at the price of breaking backward compatibility with some legacy applications. A Kernel Transaction Manager has been implemented that enables applications to work with the file system and Registry using atomic transaction operations.

=== Security-related ===
Improved security was a primary design goal for Vista. Microsoft's Trustworthy Computing initiative, which aims to improve public trust in its products, has had a direct effect on its development. This effort has resulted in a number of new security and safety features and an Evaluation Assurance Level rating of 4+.

User Account Control, or UAC is perhaps the most significant and visible of these changes. UAC is a security technology that makes it possible for users to use their computer with fewer privileges by default, to stop malware from making unauthorized changes to the system. This was often difficult in previous versions of Windows, as the previous "limited" user accounts proved too restrictive and incompatible with a large proportion of application software, and even prevented some basic operations such as looking at the calendar from the notification tray. In Windows Vista, when an action is performed that requires administrative rights (such as installing/uninstalling software or making system-wide configuration changes), the user is first prompted for an administrator name and password; in cases where the user is already an administrator, the user is still prompted to confirm the pending privileged action. Regular use of the computer such as running programs, printing, or surfing the Internet does not trigger UAC prompts. User Account Control asks for credentials in a Secure Desktop mode, in which the entire screen is dimmed, and only the authorization window is active and highlighted. The intent is to stop a malicious program from misleading the user by interfering with the authorization window, and to hint to the user about the importance of the prompt.

Testing by Symantec Corporation has proven the effectiveness of UAC. Symantec used over 2,000 active malware samples, consisting of backdoors, keyloggers, rootkits, mass mailers, trojan horses, spyware, adware, and various other samples. Each was executed on a default Windows Vista installation within a standard user account. UAC effectively blocked over 50 percent of each threat, excluding rootkits. 5 percent or less of the malware that evaded UAC survived a reboot.

Internet Explorer 7's new security and safety features include a phishing filter, IDN with anti-spoofing capabilities, and integration with system-wide parental controls. For added security, ActiveX controls are disabled by default. Also, Internet Explorer operates in a protected mode, which operates with lower permissions than the user and runs in isolation from other applications in the operating system, preventing it from accessing or modifying anything besides the Temporary Internet Files directory. Microsoft's anti-spyware product, Windows Defender, has been incorporated into Windows, protecting against malware and other threats. Changes to various system configuration settings (such as new auto-starting applications) are blocked unless the user gives consent.

Whereas prior releases of Windows supported per-file encryption using Encrypting File System, the Enterprise and Ultimate editions of Vista include BitLocker Drive Encryption, which can protect entire volumes, notably the operating system volume. However, BitLocker requires approximately a 1.5-gigabyte partition to be permanently not encrypted and to contain system files for Windows to boot. In normal circumstances, the only time this partition is accessed is when the computer is booting, or when there is a Windows update that changes files in this area, which is a legitimate reason to access this section of the drive. The area can be a potential security issue, because a hexadecimal editor (such as dskprobe.exe), or malicious software running with administrator and/or kernel level privileges would be able to write to this "Ghost Partition" and allow a piece of malicious software to compromise the system, or disable the encryption. BitLocker can work in conjunction with a Trusted Platform Module (TPM) cryptoprocessor (version 1.2) embedded in a computer's motherboard, or with a USB key. However, as with other full disk encryption technologies, BitLocker is vulnerable to a cold boot attack, especially where TPM is used as a key protector without a boot PIN being required too.

A variety of other privilege-restriction techniques are also built into Vista. An example is the concept of "integrity levels" in user processes, whereby a process with a lower integrity level cannot interact with processes of a higher integrity level and cannot perform DLL–injection to processes of a higher integrity level. The security restrictions of Windows services are more fine-grained, so that services (especially those listening on the network) cannot interact with parts of the operating system they do not need to. Obfuscation techniques such as address space layout randomization are used to increase the amount of effort required of malware before successful infiltration of a system. Code integrity verifies that system binaries have not been tampered with by malicious code.

As part of the redesign of the network stack, Windows Firewall has been upgraded, with new support for filtering both incoming and outgoing traffic. Advanced packet filter rules can be created that can grant or deny communications to specific services.

The 64-bit versions of Vista require that all new Kernel-Mode device drivers be digitally signed, so that the creator of the driver can be identified. This is also on par with one of the primary goals of Vista to move code out of kernel-mode into user-mode drivers, with another example being the new Windows Display Driver Model.

=== System management ===
While much of the focus of Vista's new capabilities highlighted the new user interface, security technologies, and improvements to the core operating system, Microsoft also adding new deployment and maintenance features:

- The Windows Imaging Format (WIM) provides the cornerstone of Microsoft's new deployment and packaging system. WIM files, which contain a HAL-independent image of Windows Vista, can be maintained and patched without having to rebuild new images. Windows Images can be delivered via Systems Management Server or Business Desktop Deployment technologies. Images can be customized and configured with applications then deployed to corporate client personal computers using little to no touch by a system administrator. ImageX is the Microsoft tool used to create and customize images.
- Windows Deployment Services replaces Remote Installation Services for deploying Vista and prior versions of Windows.
- Approximately 700 new Group Policy settings have been added, covering most aspects of the new features in the operating system, as well as significantly expanding the configurability of wireless networks, removable storage devices, and user desktop experience. Vista also introduced an XML-based format (ADMX) to display registry-based policy settings, making it easier to manage networks that span geographic locations and different languages.
- Services for UNIX, renamed as "Subsystem for UNIX-based Applications", comes with the Enterprise and Ultimate editions of Vista. Network File System (NFS) client support is also included.
- Multilingual User Interface–Unlike previous versions of Windows (which required the loading of language packs to provide local-language support), Windows Vista Ultimate and Enterprise editions support the ability to dynamically change languages based on the logged-on user's preference.
- Wireless Projector support

=== Developer ===
Windows Vista includes a large number of new application programming interfaces. Chief among them is the inclusion of version 3.0 of the .NET Framework, which consists of a class library and Common Language Runtime. Version 3.0 includes four new major components:

- Windows Presentation Foundation is a user interface subsystem and framework based vector graphics, which makes use of 3D computer graphics hardware and Direct3D technologies. It provides the foundation for building applications and blending application UI, documents, and media content. It is the successor to Windows Forms.
- Windows Communication Foundation is a service-oriented messaging subsystem that enables applications and systems to interoperate locally or remotely using Web services.
- Windows Workflow Foundation provides task automation and integrated transactions using workflows. It is the programming model, engine, and tools for building workflow-enabled applications on Windows.
- Windows CardSpace is a component that securely stores digital identities of a person, and provides a unified interface for choosing the identity for a particular transaction, such as logging into a website.

These technologies are also available for Windows XP and Windows Server 2003 to facilitate their introduction to and usage by developers and end-users.

There are also significant new development APIs in the core of the operating system, notably the completely re-designed audio, networking, print, and video interfaces, major changes to the security infrastructure, improvements to the deployment and installation of applications ("ClickOnce" and Windows Installer 4.0), new device driver development model ("Windows Driver Foundation"), Transactional NTFS, mobile computing API advancements (power management, Tablet PC Ink support, SideShow) and major updates to (or complete replacements of) many core subsystems such as Winlogon and CAPI.

There are some issues for software developers using some of the graphics APIs in Vista. Games or programs built solely on the Windows Vista-exclusive version of DirectX, version 10, cannot work on prior versions of Windows, as DirectX 10 is not available for previous Windows versions. Also, games that require the features of D3D9Ex, the updated implementation of DirectX 9 in Windows Vista are also incompatible with previous Windows versions. According to a Microsoft blog, there are three choices for OpenGL implementation on Vista. An application can use the default implementation, which translates OpenGL calls into the Direct3D API and is frozen at OpenGL version 1.4, or an application can use an Installable Client Driver (ICD), which comes in two flavors: legacy and Vista-compatible. A legacy ICD disables the Desktop Window Manager, a Vista-compatible ICD takes advantage of a new API, and is fully compatible with the Desktop Window Manager. At least two primary vendors, ATI and NVIDIA provided full Vista-compatible ICDs. However, hardware overlay is not supported, because it is considered as an obsolete feature in Vista. ATI and NVIDIA strongly recommend using compositing desktop/Framebuffer Objects for same functionality.

=== Installation ===
Windows Vista is the first Microsoft operating system:

- To use DVD-ROM media for installation
- To provide during setup a selection of multiple editions of Windows available for installation (a license determines which version of Windows Vista is eligible for installation)
- That can be installed only on a partition formatted with the NTFS file system
- That supports installation from either OEM or retail media and during setup the input of a single license regardless of the installation source (previous releases of Windows maintained OEM and retail versions separately — users installing Windows from a manufacturer-supplied source could not input a retail license during setup, and users installing Windows from a retail source could not input a manufacturer-supplied license)
- That supports loading drivers for SCSI, SATA and RAID controllers from any source (such as optical disc drives and USB flash drives) in addition to floppy disks prior to its installation
- That can be installed on and booted from systems with GPT disks and UEFI firmware (Note: 64-bit editions of Windows Vista only. Requires Service Pack 1.)

== Removed features ==
Some notable Windows XP applications and features have been replaced or removed in Windows Vista, including Active Desktop, MSN Explorer, HyperTerminal, Messenger service NetMeeting, NTBackup, and Windows Messenger. Several multimedia features, networking features, and Shell and Windows Explorer features such as the Luna visual style are no longer available.

== Support lifecycle ==
Support for the original release of Windows Vista (without a service pack) ended on April 13, 2010. Windows Vista Service Pack 1 was retired on July 12, 2011, and Windows Vista Service Pack 2 reached its end of support on April 11, 2017.

In 2020, Microsoft announced that it would disable the Windows Update service for SHA-1 endpoints for older Windows versions. Since Windows Vista did not get an update for SHA-2, Windows Update Services are no longer available on the OS as of late July 2020. As of March 2024, many of the old updates for Windows Vista are available on the Microsoft Update Catalog. A third-party tool named Legacy Update allows previously released updates for Windows Vista to be installed from the Update Catalog.

== Upgradability ==
Several Windows Vista components are upgradable to the latest versions, which include new versions introduced in later versions of Windows, and other major Microsoft applications are available. These latest versions for Windows Vista include:

- DirectX 11
- Internet Explorer 9
- Windows Installer 4.5
- Microsoft Virtual PC 2007 SP1
- .NET Framework 4.6
- Visual Studio 2015
- Office 2010 SP2

== Editions ==
Windows Vista shipped in six different product editions. These were deviced across separate consumer and business target markets, with editions varying in features to cater to specific sub-markets. For consumers, there are three editions, with two available for economically more developed countries. Windows Vista Starter edition is aimed at low-powered computers with availability only in emerging markets. Windows Vista Home Basic is intended for budget users. Windows Vista Home Premium covers the majority of the consumer market and contains applications for creating and using multimedia; the home editions consequently cannot join a Windows Server domain. For businesses, there are three editions as well. Windows Vista Business is specifically designed for small and medium-sized enterprises, while Windows Vista Enterprise is only available to Software Assurance customers. Windows Vista Ultimate contains all features from the Home and Business editions, as well as Windows Ultimate Extras. In the European Union, Home Basic N and Business N variants without Windows Media Player are also available due to sanctions brought against Microsoft for violating anti-monopoly laws; similar sanctions exist in South Korea.

== Visual styles ==
A comparison of the four distinct visual styles included in Windows Vista

Windows Vista includes four distinct visual styles:

Windows Aero
Windows Aero requires the Desktop Window Manager and is available in Home Premium and subsequent editions. Windows Aero introduces support for advanced visual effects such as blurred glass translucencies and dynamic glass reflections, Flip and Flip 3D, smooth window animations, and thumbnails on the taskbar. Windows Aero is intended for mid-range to high-end video cards; to enable its features the contents of every open window are stored in video in video memory to facilitate preemptive graphic operations such as tearing-free movement of windows. As a result, Windows Aero has significantly higher hardware requirements than its predecessors; video cards must support 128 MB of memory, 32 bits per pixel, DirectX 9, Pixel Shader 2.0, and the new Windows Display Driver Model (WDDM).
Windows Vista Standard
A variant of Windows Aero, but it lacks advanced graphical effects including blurred glass translucencies, dynamic glass reflections, and smooth window animations; it is only included in Windows Vista Home Basic.
Windows Vista Basic
A visual style that does not rely on the Desktop Window Manager; as such, it does not feature blurred glass translucencies, dynamic glass reflections, smooth window animations, or taskbar thumbnails. Windows Vista Basic has video card requirements similar to Windows XP, and it is the default visual style of Windows Vista Starter and on systems without support for Windows Aero. Before Windows Vista SP1, machines that failed Windows Genuine Advantage product license validation would also revert to this visual style.
Windows Standard/Windows Classic
This visual style reprises the user interface of Windows 9x, Windows 2000, and Windows Server. As with previous versions of Windows, this visual style supports custom color schemes, which are collections of color settings. Windows Vista includes four high-contrast color schemes and the default color schemes from Windows 98 (titled "Windows Classic") and Windows 2000/Windows Me (titled "Windows Standard").

== Hardware requirements ==
Computers capable of running Windows Vista are classified as Vista Capable and Vista Premium Ready. A Vista Capable or equivalent PC is capable of running all editions of Windows Vista although some of the special features and high-end graphics options may require additional or more advanced hardware. A Vista Premium Ready PC can take advantage of Vista's high-end features.

Windows Vista's Basic and Classic interfaces work with virtually any graphics hardware that supports Windows XP or 2000; accordingly, most discussion around Vista's graphics requirements centers on those for the Windows Aero interface. As of Windows Vista Beta 2, the NVIDIA GeForce 6 series and later, the ATI Radeon 9500 and later, Intel's GMA 950 and later integrated graphics, and a handful of VIA chipsets and S3 Graphics discrete chips are supported. Although originally supported, the GeForce FX 5 series has been dropped from newer drivers from NVIDIA. The last driver from NVIDIA to support the GeForce FX series on Vista was 96.85. Microsoft offered a tool called the Windows Vista Upgrade Advisor to assist Windows XP and Vista users in determining what versions of Windows their machine is capable of running. The required server connections for this utility are no longer available. Although the installation media included in retail packages is a 32-bit DVD, customers needing a CD-ROM or customers who wish for a 64-bit install media can acquire this media through the Windows Vista Alternate Media program. The Ultimate edition includes both 32-bit and 64-bit media. The digitally downloaded version of Ultimate includes only one version, either 32-bit or 64-bit, from Windows Marketplace.

Windows Vista system requirements
Component of PC	Minimum required	Recommended
Processor	800 MHz	1 GHz
Memory	512 MB (384 MB for Starter edition)	1 GB
Graphics card	Super VGA	WDDM 1.0-compliant 32 bits per pixel DirectX 9.0 support Pixel Shader 2.0 support
Graphics memory	—N/a	128 MB
Total HDD capacity	20 GB	40 GB
Free HDD space	15 GB	15 GB
Optical drives	CD-ROM drive	DVD-ROM drive
Others	—N/a	TV tuner card (Premium, Ultimate); Touchscreen (Premium, Business, Ultimate); USB flash drive (Ultimate); Trusted Platform Module (Ultimate)

=== Physical memory limits ===
The maximum amount of RAM that Windows Vista supports varies by edition and processor architecture, as shown in the table.

Edition	Processor architecture	
Edition	IA-32	x86-64
Ultimate	4 GB	128 GB
Enterprise	4 GB	128 GB
Business	4 GB	128 GB
Home Premium	4 GB	16 GB
Home Basic	4 GB	8 GB
Starter	1 GB	—N/a

=== Processor limits ===
Maximum number of physical processors that Windows Vista supports is: 1 for Starter, Home Basic, and Home Premium; and 2 for Business, Enterprise, and Ultimate.

Maximum number of logical processors (Note: A logical processor is either: One of the cores on one of the physical processors without SMT; or one of the two threads handled by one of the cores on one of the physical processors with SMT.) that Windows Vista supports is: 32 for 32-bit (x86-32) and 64 for 64-bit (x86-64).

== Updates ==
Microsoft releases updates such as service packs for its Windows operating systems to add features, address issues, and improve performance and stability.

=== Service Pack 1 ===
Windows Vista Service Pack 1 (SP1) was released on February 4, 2008, alongside Windows Server 2008 to OEM partners, after a five-month beta test period. The initial deployment of the service pack caused a number of machines to continually reboot, rendering the machines unusable. This temporarily caused Microsoft to suspend automatic deployment of the service pack until the problem was resolved. The synchronized release date of the two operating systems reflected the merging of the workstation and server kernels back into a single code base for the first time since Windows 2000. MSDN subscribers were able to download SP1 on February 15, 2008. SP1 became available to current Windows Vista users on Windows Update and the Download Center on March 18, 2008. Initially, the service pack only supported five languages – English, French, Spanish, German and Japanese. Support for the remaining 31 languages was released on April 14, 2008.

A white paper, published by Microsoft on August 29, 2007, outlined the scope and intent of the service pack, identifying three major areas of improvement: reliability and performance, administration experience, and support for newer hardware and standards.

One area of particular note is performance. Areas of improvement include file copy operations, hibernation, logging off on domain-joined machines, JavaScript parsing in Internet Explorer, network file share browsing, Windows Explorer ZIP file handling, and Windows Disk Defragmenter. The ability to choose individual drives to defragment is being reintroduced as well.

Service Pack 1 introduced support for some new hardware and software standards, notably the exFAT file system, 802.11n wireless networking, IPv6 over VPN connections, SSE4 support, and the Secure Socket Tunneling Protocol.

Booting a system using Extensible Firmware Interface on x64 systems was also introduced; this feature had originally been slated for the initial release of Vista but was delayed due to a lack of compatible hardware at the time. Booting from a GUID Partition Table–based hard drive greater than 2.19 TB is supported (x64 only).

Two areas have seen changes in SP1 that have come as the result of concerns from software vendors. One of these is desktop search; users will be able to change the default desktop search program to one provided by a third party instead of the Microsoft desktop search program that comes with Windows Vista, and desktop search programs will be able to seamlessly tie in their services into the operating system. These changes come in part due to complaints from Google, whose Google Desktop Search application was hindered by the presence of Vista's built-in desktop search. In June 2007, Google claimed that the changes being introduced for SP1 "are a step in the right direction, but they should be improved further to give consumers greater access to alternate desktop search providers". The other area of note is a set of new security APIs being introduced for the benefit of antivirus software that currently relies on the unsupported practice of patching the kernel (see Kernel Patch Protection).

An update to DirectX 10, named DirectX 10.1, marked mandatory several features that were previously optional in Direct3D 10 hardware. Graphics cards will be required to support DirectX 10.1. SP1 includes a kernel (6001.18000) that matches the version shipped with Windows Server 2008.

The Group Policy Management Console (GPMC) was replaced by the Group Policy Object Editor. An updated downloadable version of the Group Policy Management Console was released soon after the service pack.

SP1 enables support for hotpatching, a reboot-reduction servicing technology designed to maximize uptime. It works by allowing Windows components to be updated (or "patched") while they are still in use by a running process. Hotpatch-enabled update packages are installed via the same methods as traditional update packages, and will not trigger a system reboot.

=== Service Pack 2 ===
Service Pack 2 for Windows Vista and Windows Server 2008 was released through different channels between April 28 and June 9, 2009, one year after the release of Windows Vista SP1, and four months before the release of Windows 7. In addition to a number of security and other fixes, a number of new features have been added. It did not include Internet Explorer 8, which was included in Windows 7, and made available as an update for Windows Vista.

- Windows Search 4 (available for SP1 systems as a standalone update)
- Feature Pack for Wireless adds support for Bluetooth 2.1
- Windows Feature Pack for Storage enables the data recording onto Blu-ray media
- Windows Connect Now (WCN) to simplify Wi-Fi configuration
- Improved support for resuming with active Wi-Fi connections
- Improved support for eSATA drives
- The limit of 10 half-open, outgoing TCP connections introduced in Windows XP SP2 was removed
- Enables the exFAT file system to support UTC timestamps, which allows correct file synchronization across time zones
- Support for ICCD/CCID smart cards
- Support for VIA 64-bit CPUs
- Improved performance and responsiveness with the RSS feeds sidebar
- Improves audio and video performance for streaming high-definition content
- Improves Windows Media Center (WMC) in content protection for TV
- Provides an improved power management policy that is approximately 10% more efficient than the original with the default policies
- AES-NI support

Windows Vista and Windows Server 2008 share a single service pack binary, reflecting the fact that their code bases were joined with the release of Server 2008. Service Pack 2 is not a cumulative update meaning that Service Pack 1 must be installed first.

=== Platform Update ===
The Platform Update for Windows Vista and Windows Server 2008 (KB971644) was announced on September 10, 2009 and released on October 27, 2009; The Platform Update for Windows Vista and Windows Server 2008 allows developers to target both Windows Vista and Windows 7 by backporting several significant components by consisting of:

- Windows Automation API 3.0 (MSAA and UI Automation updates)
- Windows Graphics Runtime (Direct2D, Direct3D 10 Level 9, Direct3D 11, DirectX 11, DXGI 1.1, DirectWrite, and WARP)
- XPS Document API, XPS Rasterization Service, and XPS Print API
- Windows Ribbon and Animation Manager Library (Windows Animation Manager API and Windows Ribbon API)
- Windows Portable Devices Platform (Media Transfer Protocol over Bluetooth and WPD over MTP Device Services)

With the release of the Platform Update on October 27, 2009, the Windows Management Framework (Background Intelligent Transfer Service 4.0, Windows PowerShell 2.0, and Windows Remote Management 2.0) of Windows 7 was also made available to users of Windows Vista; Windows XP limited Background Intelligent Transfer Service to 2.5. Remote Desktop Connection 7.0 was made available as well.

In July 2011, Microsoft released the Platform Update Supplement (KB2117917) to address issues and improve performance on Windows Vista and Windows Server 2008 machines with the Platform Update installed.

=== Out-of-band patches ===
BlueKeep patch
Microsoft released an update for Windows Vista SP2 to resolve the BlueKeep security vulnerability (CVE-2019-0708) that affects the Remote Desktop Protocol of several versions of Windows. Subsequent related flaws, CVE-2019-1181, CVE-2019-1182, CVE-2019-1222 and CVE-2019-1226 (collectively known as DejaBlue) do not affect Windows Vista or earlier versions of Windows. The installation of this patch in Windows Vista changes the build number of Windows Vista from 6002 to 6003. (Note: Installing the Monthly Rollup package released for Windows Server 2008 on March 19, 2019 (KB4489887) (or any subsequent rollup package) onto Windows Vista will update its build number from version 6.0.6002 to 6.0.6003. This change was made so Microsoft could continue to service the operating system while avoiding "version-related issues". The Security-Only BlueKeep Patch (KB4499180) includes patches released after May 2019, two months after this change was initiated (and its installation will thus update the build number).)

CredSSP encryption oracle remediation
A remote code execution vulnerability was discovered in the Credential Security Support Provider protocol (CredSSP) (CVE-2018-0886) that could allow attackers to relay user credentials during a connection to execute code on a targeted system. Microsoft released a patch to address the issue.

Microsoft Malware Protection Engine patch
A vulnerability related to Windows Defender that affected the way the Malware Protection Engine operates (CVE-2017-0290) was reported in May 2017. If Windows Defender scanned a specially crafted file, it would lead to memory corruption, potentially allowing an attacker to control the affected machine or perform arbitrary code execution in the context of LocalSystem; the vulnerability was exacerbated by the default real-time protection settings of Windows Defender, which were configured to automatically initiate malware scans at regular intervals. The first version of the Protection Engine affected by the vulnerability is Version 1.1.13701.0—subsequent versions of the engine are unaffected. Microsoft released a patch to address the issue.

== Marketing campaigns ==
=== The Mojave Experiment ===
Microsoft introduced an advertising campaign in July 2008 called the Mojave Experiment that depicted a group of people being asked to evaluate what is purported to be a new operating system codenamed "Mojave". Participants were asked for their impressions of Windows Vista, whether they used it, and to assess it based on a scale from one to ten. Participants were then shown a demonstration of Windows Vista features and were then asked to assess "Mojave"; none of the participants gave "Mojave" a rating lower than an initial rating for Windows Vista. The campaign implied that negative reception of Windows Vista was based partially on preconceived ideas. The campaign had been criticized for focusing on positive statements from participants and not addressing all criticism of Windows Vista.

== Reception ==
Windows Vista received mixed reviews at the time of its release and throughout its lifespan, mainly for its much higher hardware requirements and perceived slowness compared to Windows XP.

It received generally positive reviews from PC gamers who praised the advantages brought by DirectX 10, which allowed for better gaming performance and more realistic graphics, as well as support for many new capabilities featured in new GPUs. However, many DirectX 9 games initially ran with lower frame rates compared to when they were run on Windows XP. In mid-2008, benchmarks suggested that the SP1 update improved performance to be on par with (or better than) Windows XP in terms of game performance.

Peter Bright of Ars Technica wrote that, despite its delays and feature cuts, Windows Vista was "a huge evolution in the history of the NT platform [...] The fundamental changes to the platform are of a scale not seen since the release of NT [3.1; the first version]." In a continuation of his previous assessment, Bright stated that "Vista is not simply XP with a new skin; core parts of the OS have been radically overhauled, and virtually every area has seen significant refinement. In terms of the magnitude and extent of these changes, Vista represents probably the biggest leap that the NT platform has ever seen. Never before have significant subsystems been gutted and replaced in the way they are in Vista." Many others in the tech industry echoed these sentiments at the time, directing praise towards the massive amount of technical features new to Windows Vista.

Windows Vista received the "Best of CES" award at the Consumer Electronics Show in 2007.

In its first year of availability, PC World rated it as the biggest tech disappointment of 2007, and it was rated by InfoWorld as No. 2 of Tech's all-time 25 flops. Microsoft's then much smaller competitor Apple noted that, despite Vista's far greater sales, its own operating system did not seem to have suffered after its release, and would later invest in advertising mocking Vista's unpopularity with users.

Computer manufacturers such as Dell, Lenovo, and Hewlett-Packard released their newest computers with Windows Vista pre-installed; however, after the negative reception of the operating system, they also began selling their computers with Windows XP CDs included because of a drop in sales.

=== Post-release ===
The Service Pack 1 update, released in 2008, received mixed reviews. Gizmodo wrote that it did not solve the "most annoying flaws" of the original release of the operating system. Robert Vamosi of CNET thought that while it fixes many tiny problems, it didn't significantly improve performance.

Service Pack 2 was well received, with TechRadar writing in its review that it is a "must-have upgrade that finally makes Vista a joy to use." The New York Times's Randall Kennedy, while previewing the beta version, gave praise to the performance improvements.

=== Sales ===
A Gartner research report predicted that Vista business adoption in 2008 would overtake that of XP during the same time frame (21.3% vs. 16.9%) while IDC had indicated that the launch of Windows Server 2008 served as a catalyst for the stronger adoption rates. As of January 2009, Forrester Research had indicated that almost one third of North American and European corporations had started deploying Vista. At a May 2009 conference, a Microsoft Vice President said "Adoption and deployment of Windows Vista has been slightly ahead of where we had been with XP" for big businesses.

Within its first month, 20 million copies of Vista were sold, double the amount of Windows XP sales within its first month in October 2001, five years earlier. Shortly after however, due to Vista's relatively low adoption rates and continued demand for Windows XP, Microsoft decided to sell Windows XP until June 30, 2008, instead of the previously planned date of January 31, 2008. There were reports of Vista users "downgrading" their operating systems back to XP, as well as reports of businesses planning to skip Vista. A study conducted by ChangeWave in March 2008 showed that the percentage of corporate users who were "very satisfied" with Vista was dramatically lower than other operating systems, with Vista at 8%, compared to the 40% who said they were "very satisfied" with Windows XP.

The internet-usage market share for Windows Vista after two years of availability, in January 2009, was 20.61%. This figure combined with World Internet Users and Population Stats yielded a user base of roughly 330 million, which exceeded Microsoft's two-year post launch expectations by 130 million. The internet user base reached before the release of its successor (Windows 7) was roughly 400 million according to the same statistical sources.

== Criticism ==
Windows Vista received mixed reviews. Criticism targets include protracted development time (5–6 years), more restrictive licensing terms, the inclusion of several technologies aimed at restricting the copying of protected digital media, and the usability of the new User Account Control security technology. Moreover, some concerns have been raised about many PCs meeting "Vista Premium Ready" hardware requirements and Vista's pricing.

=== Hardware requirements ===
While in 2005 Microsoft claimed "nearly all PCs on the market today will run Windows Vista", the higher requirements of some of the "premium" features, such as the Aero interface, affected many upgraders. According to the UK newspaper The Times in May 2006, the full set of features "would be available to less than 5 percent of Britain's PC market"; however, this prediction was made several months before Vista was released. This continuing lack of clarity eventually led to a class action against Microsoft as people found themselves with new computers that were unable to use the new software to its full potential despite the assurance of "Vista Capable" designations. The court case has made public internal Microsoft communications that indicate that senior executives have also had difficulty with this issue. For example, Mike Nash (Corporate Vice President, Windows Product Management) commented, "I now have a $2,100 e-mail machine" because his laptop lacked an appropriate graphics chip needed for Vista's advanced features.

=== Licensing ===
Criticism of upgrade licenses pertaining to Windows Vista Starter through Home Premium was expressed by Ars Technica's Ken Fisher, who noted that the new requirement of having a prior operating system already installed was going to irritate users who reinstall Windows regularly. It has been revealed that an Upgrade copy of Windows Vista can be installed clean without first installing a previous version of Windows. On the first install, Windows will refuse to activate. The user must then reinstall that same copy of Vista. Vista will then activate on the reinstall, thus allowing a user to install an Upgrade of Windows Vista without owning a previous operating system. As with Windows XP, separate rules still apply to OEM versions of Vista installed on new PCs: Microsoft asserts that these versions are not legally transferable (although whether this conflicts with the right of first sale has yet to be clearly decided legally).

=== Cost ===
Initially, the cost of Windows Vista was also a source of concern and commentary. A majority of users in a poll said that the prices of various Windows Vista editions posted on the Microsoft Canada website in August 2006 make the product too expensive. A BBC News report on the day of Vista's release suggested that, "there may be a backlash from consumers over its pricing plans—with the cost of Vista versions in the US roughly half the price of equivalent versions in the UK." Following the release of Vista in 2006, Microsoft reduced the retail, and upgraded the price point of Vista. Originally, Vista Ultimate was priced at $399, and Home Premium Vista at $239. These prices were later reduced to $319 and $199 respectively.

=== Digital rights management ===
Windows Vista supports additional forms of DRM restrictions. One aspect of this is the Protected Video Path, which is designed so that "premium content" from HD DVD or Blu-ray Discs may mandate that the connections between PC components be encrypted. Depending on what the content demands, the devices may not pass premium content over non-encrypted outputs, or they must artificially degrade the quality of the signal on such outputs or not display it at all. Drivers for such hardware must be approved by Microsoft; a revocation mechanism is also included, which allows Microsoft to disable drivers of devices in end-user PCs over the Internet. Peter Gutmann, security researcher and author of the open source cryptlib library, claims that these mechanisms violate fundamental rights of the user (such as fair use), unnecessarily increase the cost of hardware, and make systems less reliable (the "tilt bit" being a particular worry; if triggered, the entire graphic subsystem performs a reset) and vulnerable to denial-of-service attacks. However, despite several requests for evidence supporting such claims Peter Gutmann has never supported his claims with any researched evidence. Proponents have claimed that Microsoft had no choice but to follow the demands of the movie studios, and that the technology will not actually be enabled until after 2010; Microsoft also noted that content protection mechanisms have existed in Windows as far back as Windows ME, and that the new protections will not apply to any existing content, only future content.

=== User Account Control ===
Although User Account Control (UAC) is an important part of Vista's security infrastructure as it blocks software from silently gaining administrator privileges without the user's knowledge, it has been widely criticized for generating too many prompts. This has led many Vista UAC users to consider it troublesome, with some consequently either turning the feature off or (for Windows Vista Enterprise or Windows Vista Ultimate users) putting it in auto-approval mode. Responding to this criticism, Microsoft altered the implementation to reduce the number of prompts with SP1. Though the changes resulted in some improvement, it did not alleviate the concerns completely.

== Downgrade rights ==
End-users of licenses of Windows 7 acquired through OEM or volume licensing may downgrade to the equivalent edition of Windows Vista. Downgrade rights are not offered for Starter, Home Basic or Home Premium editions of Windows 7. For Windows 8 licenses acquired through an OEM, a user may also downgrade to the equivalent edition of Windows Vista. Customers licensed for use of Windows 8 Enterprise are generally licensed for Windows 8 Pro, which may be downgraded to Windows Vista Business.

== See also ==
- BlueKeep (security vulnerability)
- Comparison of Windows Vista and Windows XP
- Microsoft Security Essentials
