= Purble Place =

2007 video game

- Screenshot of the Purble Place main menu on Windows Vista
- Developer: Oberon Media
- Publisher: Microsoft Corporation
- Producer: Cara Ely
- Programmers: Jane Jensen (Lead Developer); Brendan Walker; Dan Thompson; Tam Armstrong
- Platforms: Windows Vista; Windows 7
- Release: WW: 30 January 2007
- Genres: Action, mysteries, puzzle, strategies
- Mode: Single-player

Purble Place is a suite of three educational computer games developed by Oberon Media that was included with all versions of Windows Vista and Windows 7. It was designed for younger users as a child-oriented game included with standard Windows software, incorporating puzzles into its gameplay.

The suite features three mini-games: Purble Pairs, a memory game in which players remove all tiles from a board by finding matching pairs; Comfy Cakes, which involves assembling and decorating cakes; and Purble Shop, a deduction-based game similar to Guess Who?.

== Gameplay ==
Purble Place features a single home screen that serves as the central hub for three games: Purble Pairs, Comfy Cakes and Purble Shop.

=== Purble Pairs ===
Purble Pairs is a pattern recognition and memory game similar to Concentration. The object is to clear the tableau in the fewest turns. As the skill level progresses, a timer appears, the grid size increases, and more similar pictures are used. The Beginner level has one 5x5 grid, Intermediate has two 6x6 grids, and Advanced has four 8x8 grids to solve per game (shamrocks, hearts, smiley faces or gumdrops). In addition to a jester that automatically finds another match of an exposed card, numerous special pairs are present in the higher levels, such as a card of the cake batter station in Comfy Cakes that shuffles the board when paired, a clock that adds more time to the timer, and a Purble Chef that automatically finds and matches pairs of cards containing cakes. A Sneak Peek coin bonus allows the player to expose all remaining cards for a couple of seconds, but every card exposed in this way is counted as a turn.

=== Comfy Cakes ===
Comfy Cakes is a hand-eye coordination game. The goal is to fill orders in a bakery by assembling a cake to match a given cake specification on a mobile by controlling a conveyor belt that brings the cake to various stations. Elements of the cake include cake pan shapes (square, circular or heart-shaped), flavor of batter (strawberry, chocolate or vanilla), three cake layerings (red, green or white), optional icing (strawberry, chocolate or vanilla), and other decorations (for instance, sugar may be sprinkled on top of the cake, and in rarer cases, flames are applied to iced cakes to create a smooth glaze), and a rotate button in v0.4. If the cake does not match the specification on the television, the player is penalized, and the cake gets thrown away. If the player sends two or three incorrect orders, the game is over. After a certain number of correct orders are shipped in the box, the player wins the game, and the score is tabulated. The final score depends upon the number of cakes baked, the number of incorrect orders sent and the efficiency of the player. At higher levels the specifications become more complex and multiple cakes must be manufactured in parallel on a single conveyor belt. The player makes about five or six (or eight in v0.4) cakes in one of the difficulty levels. As the levels increase so does the difficulty level, with more levels and designs required for the cake. When the player does not get the features in the wax paper, the computer tells them the move is disallowed.

=== Purble Shop ===
One of 3125 possible looks for a Purble with five features

Purble Shop is a code-breaker game. The computer decides the color of up to five features (topper (hair in version 0.4), eyes, nose, mouth and clothes) that are concealed from the player. The player can choose from an assortment of colors (red, purple, yellow, blue or green), and a color can be used once, several times or not used. The player then attempts to deduce or guess the right feature colors in a limited number of guesses (not available in beginner difficulty). There are three difficulty levels: Beginner with three features in three possible colors; 3^{3} = 27 different possible solutions, Intermediate with 4^{4} = 256 solutions, and Advanced with 5^{5} = 3125 solutions. The beginner and intermediate levels are guessing games where after each move the computer tells the player which items were right, so there is little scope for deduction. At the advanced level the computer does not tell the player which specific items were right, reporting only the count of picks in the right color and position, and the count of picks in the right color but the wrong position. This level is similar to the colored peg game Mastermind, where success requires logical reasoning (although there is a small chance of succeeding through lucky guesses).

== Development ==
Purble Place was developed in 2005 by Oberon Media, who were contracted by Microsoft to remake its inbuilt game suite for Windows Vista with an original children's title. Development took place under one year, complicated by requirements to meet Microsoft's security, political and accessibility standards for the operating system. Due to requirements not to use a third-party game engine, the development team hired college graduates to implement their "Flat Engine" into the game. The studio viewed development on the game as a minor project secondary to the creation of launch titles for the Xbox Live Arcade.

Purble Place was produced by Cara Ely, and principally developed by Jane Jensen (lead developer), Brendan Walker, Dan Thompson, and Tam Armstrong.

== Release ==
Purble Place was publicly introduced in the 2005 community technical preview of Windows Vista build 5219 in 2005, and packaged with Windows Vista in 2007.

== Reception ==
Writing for The Courrier, Amala Parry described Purble Place as one of the "most iconic video games from the 2000s" and recalled it as "one of the most memorable games" from her childhood. She praised its simple gameplay and educational minigames, associating them with skills such as memory, hand-eye coordination and pattern recognition. Although she noted that the game "may not be much in terms of technical features or difficulty," Parry characterized it as "simple and fun," well suited to younger players, and beneficial to cognitive development. In her Softonic review, Juliet Childers described Purble Place as an "easy to use" and "fun to look at" game that remains appealing despite its age. She wrote that its "simple UI has aged well" and called it a "great start" for introducing younger children to video games, particularly praising its matching game and "incremental learning" through different difficulty levels. However, Childers noted that children may eventually move on because the game contains "only three experiences."

Salonee Kulkarni of The Indian Express characterized Purble Place as a nostalgic childhood game for many members of Generation Z who grew up in the 2000s. She characterized its colourful setting as being "etched into memory" and cited the game as an example of an early stage in the evolution of food-related elements in video games, when food was primarily associated with play, creativity, comfort, and childhood nostalgia rather than survival or narrative progression. Writing for Screen Rant, Jom Elauria called Purble Place "neat" for its variety of mini-games, noting that it offers a "selection of mini-games that vary in difficulty and gameplay." He also noted that, while the game is "mostly targeted toward children," it can still be enjoyed by adults, referring to it as one of Microsoft Windows' "classic" titles.

Cracked.com's Belen Leiva included Purble Place among the "pixelated masterpieces" and "iconic web games" of the 2000s that she described as having "shaped our childhood aesthetics" and given players their "very first taste of digital burnout." In an article for 8List.ph, Kyzia Maramara included Purble Place among the memorable childhood video games associated with the 2000s, describing it as an "OG game" and recalling it as a title that many children experienced during the period. She highlighted its role in developing "pattern recognition and memory" and teaching players how to assemble cakes.

=== Legacy ===
Purble Place developed a "cult following" among users who encountered the game on computers running Windows Vista and Windows 7. Although it was initially considered a relatively minor project by its developers, the game experienced a resurgence in popularity during the 2020s, driven in part by internet memes, copycat games, and videos on platforms such as TikTok and YouTube. By 2024, videos and other online content related to the game had reportedly accumulated more than 50 million views. Its renewed popularity has been attributed in part to nostalgia for the era of simple, pre-installed computer games. The style of Purble Place has also been cited as representative of the Frutiger Aero aesthetic.

== See also ==
- List of games included with Windows
