= Windows Marketplace =

Online marketplace for Microsoft Windows

- Screenshot of the Windows Marketplace homepage
- Initial release: October 12, 2004; 21 years ago
- Successor: Microsoft Store

Windows Marketplace was an online digital distribution marketplace by Microsoft for the delivery of software electronically that was secured by use of Windows Live ID (now known as a Microsoft account). The digital locker platform was composed of four major components:

1. Windows Marketplace catalog
2. Multi merchant download cart
3. Digital Locker Assistant (a client-side application that facilitates the download of purchased applications)
4. Digital Locker

For consumers, the digital locker and Windows Marketplace could be used for purchasing and downloading third party software titles compatible with Microsoft Windows, and then using that purchased software on any computer the software license allows. For software developers, the digital locker and Windows Marketplace was for the distribution of their software titles.

A Windows Vista Ultimate Extra component called Secure Online Key Backup allowed backing up EFS recovery certificates, as well as the BitLocker recovery password in the Digital Locker. Windows Marketplace was only available for residents of the United States and some other countries.

== Launch ==
Windows Marketplace was announced on July 12, 2004; and launched on October 12, 2004. It provided over 93,000 products split between hardware, boxed software, and downloadable software. About 20,000 downloads were available and 5,000 were free. The site was designed to allow product comparison, purchase and discussion from one central location. Research had shown the average customer used over 20 sites when making purchases and Marketplace was an attempt to centralize that. An emphasis was placed on software designed to Microsoft's API requirements and user experience recommendations with certified software carrying the Designed-for-Windows logo surpassing 10,000 at store launch. CNET was a major initial partner, supplying Microsoft with the majority of the pricing and description information.

== 2006 Redesign ==
The site was redesigned on August 28, 2006. During the redesign a greater emphasis was placed on downloadable software instead of boxed software and hardware. In less than two years since the original launch, Microsoft tripled the software purchasable by download to 60,000 and expanded all products offered to over 150,000. The Digital Locker initiative also attempted to unify all software licenses into a central location tied to a single Windows Live ID. This version of the site was Microsoft's first offering of a full operating system, Windows Vista as a downloadable purchase; in addition to the first for Microsoft Office.

== Expansion to mobile ==
On February 16, 2009 at the Mobile World Congress, Microsoft announced Windows Marketplace for Mobile which deployed a similar concept to Windows Mobile devices. Marketplace for Mobile was shut down on May 22, 2012.

A year after Microsoft introduced Windows Marketplace for Mobile, they announced their next generation mobile platform named Windows Phone. Microsoft introduced Windows Phone Marketplace in 2010, and renamed the service to Windows Phone Store in 2012.

== Discontinuation and replacement ==
On November 14, 2008, Microsoft announced their intention to discontinue the Digital Locker in 2009. The company phased-out Windows Marketplace, and replaced it with the Microsoft Store.

At the Build conference on September 13, 2011, Microsoft announced Windows Store, a new software distribution platform for Windows 8, WinRT, and subsequent Windows versions. The Windows Store was accessible via WinRT client or web browser.
