= Chess Titans =

2006 video game

- Developer: Oberon Games
- Release: November 8, 2006; 19 years ago
- Operating system: Microsoft Windows
- Type: Computer game

Chess Titans is a chess video game with 3D graphics developed by Oberon Games and included in Windows Vista and Windows 7 Home Premium, Professional, Enterprise, and Ultimate. It is a fully 3D animated, photorealistic interactive chess game with ten difficulty levels when played against the computer. It can be played by two participants, or one player against the computer.

== History ==
The game was publicly introduced in Windows Vista build 5219.

Another chess program by Microsoft known simply as Chess was bundled in Microsoft Entertainment Pack 4 for earlier versions of Windows in 1992. It was developed by David Norris, a former Microsoft employee and author of the chess engine "Ziggurat".

== Graphics ==
The game is fully animated and designed for demonstrating the hardware-accelerated graphics capabilities of the earlier Windows Presentation Foundation in Windows Vista. The game features a photorealistic board which can be rotated in 3D, and themes are available for the chess pieces and board. The game showcases the 3D capabilities of Vista on the desktop.

== Gameplay ==
The game can be played with either a mouse and a keyboard or any gamepad controller for Windows. It can also be played through Windows Media Center, using the remote control provided with TV Tuner Cards, and certain laptops as well.

On each player's turn, Chess Titans displays the last move made by the opponent. The player can also click on a chess piece to highlight all valid moves for that piece. These features can be turned off in the Options dialog box.

=== Player vs. computer ===
- Chess Titans has ten difficulty levels, which can be selected from the Options dialog box. The player can also choose whether to play as black or white. When playing against the computer for the first time, the player is prompted to choose an initial difficulty level of Beginner (level 2), Intermediate (level 5), or Advanced (level 8).

Chess Titans keeps a record of how many games the player has won, drawn, and lost against the computer at each difficulty level. The statistics can be reset, however, it does not calculate Elo numbers or, since the player can play against the computer, approximations thereof.

=== Player vs. player ===
In a two-player game, the chess board automatically turns 180 degrees for the opposite player after each move. This option can be turned off. Chess Titans saves all two-player game scores.

== See also ==
- List of games included with Windows
