= Microsoft Mahjong =

2012 video game

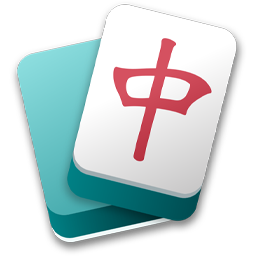
- Microsoft Mahjong on Windows 10
- Developers: Arkadium; Microsoft Casual Games
- Publisher: Microsoft Studios
- Producers: Paul Jensen; Derek Dutilly; Tristan Hall; Michael Bilodeau
- Platforms: Windows 8.x; Windows 10 Windows 11 iOS Android
- Release: Windows 8: WW: October 26, 2012; Windows 10: WW: October 14, 2016
- Genre: Puzzle
- Mode: Single-player

Microsoft Mahjong (formerly Mahjong Titans, Shanghai Solitaire and Taipei) is a computer game version of mahjong solitaire published by Microsoft. The version titled Mahjong Titans was developed by Oberon Games and included in Windows Vista and Windows 7 (except Starter and Home Basic editions). It takes advantage of the new graphical user interface (GUI) of Windows Vista, and includes features such as tile set and background choices. (In Windows Vista builds 5219 up to 5259, the game was known as Shanghai Solitaire.) The game did not make it to Windows 8; however, a standalone version, developed by Arkadium and published by Microsoft Studios, can be downloaded from the Windows Store free of charge and played without download on the web.

An older version of the game was known as Taipei and was bundled in Microsoft Entertainment Pack 1 and Best of Microsoft Entertainment Pack. That version included 32,767 possible configurations.

A separate mobile version of the game was released on iOS and Android, known as Mahjong by Microsoft.

== Features ==
The player has a choice of six tile layouts: Turtle, Dragon, Cat, Fortress, Crab, and Spider. Each is a stylized portrayal of the respective object or animal. The background image can be chosen from five different options and there are four tile sets, including traditional Mahjong tiles, variations with fuller coloring or larger print, and an alternative pastel tile set with an entirely different picture theme.

Games are not entirely random. There is always at least one pair within five tiles of the topmost five tiles in the turtle layout and often two pairs. The algorithm for tile organization positions tiles such that they can mostly be paired on the same level, or otherwise a matching tile is available in an accessible position one level down. It does not check to ensure that the matching tile is not positioned beneath its partner. Since every tile has 3 partners this is not enough, by itself, to prove the game is impossible to solve.

The newer version of Microsoft Mahjong adds new layouts, improved graphics and sound, online features such as a set of daily challenges that reward the user with "badges" when completed, and Xbox Live integration.

== See also ==
- List of games included with Windows
