= Microsoft Hearts =

Microsoft Windows game

Hearts

- Hearts in Windows 7 before a hand is played. The South player must select three cards, passing them to West and receiving three from East. Play will commence with the player who holds the 2 of Clubs leading it.
- Developer: Microsoft
- Release: April 6, 1992; 34 years ago
- Operating system: Microsoft Windows
- Type: Computer game

Hearts, also known as Microsoft Hearts and The Microsoft Hearts Network, is a trick-taking computer game included with Microsoft Windows. Based on the card game Hearts, it was introduced in Windows 3.1 in 1992 and appeared in every version of the operating system until Windows 7.

Originally designed to showcase Microsoft's NetDDE networking technology, the game allows for both single-player against computer opponents and multiplayer over a local network. While the game's title refers to the Hearts family of games, the mechanics specifically follow the Black Lady variant. An online version, named Internet Hearts was included in Me and XP.

== History ==
Hearts was first included in Windows with Windows for Workgroups 3.11, Microsoft's first "network-ready" version of Windows, released in 1992, which included a new networking technology that Microsoft called NetDDE. Microsoft used Hearts to showcase the new NetDDE technology by enabling multiple players to play simultaneously across a computer network. This legacy could be seen in the original title bar name for the program, "The Microsoft Hearts Network" (although network play was removed in the Windows XP version).

Hearts was absent in all Windows NT-based OSes prior to Windows XP including Windows NT 4.0 and Windows 2000. From the 'Help' menu, Hearts offered a quotation from Shakespeare's famous play, Julius Caesar (act III, scene ii): "I come not, friends, to steal away your hearts...". Later versions of Windows starting with Vista removed this quotation.

Hearts is not included with Windows 8, 10 or 11. As part of the operating system, it is deleted upon upgrading to Windows 10 from an earlier version.

On The Microsoft Hearts Network for Windows for Workgroups 3.1, the default opponent names are Anna, Lynda, and Terri. In later versions, the three default opponent names, Pauline, Michele, and Ben, were specified by the program's developer. One is the spouse of a Microsoft employee who found a program bug, one was a Microsoft employee who resigned in 1995, and one is an employee's child who frequented the Microsoft worksite. The names are not used in the Windows Vista version of the game, instead favoring the three cardinal directions that the computer players pertain to depending on their side of the window ("West", "North", and "East"). This version of the game no longer prompts for a player name to be entered at startup, and instead uses the name of the currently logged-in user account as the player name.

== Gameplay ==
Gameplay follows the rules of a version of the Black Lady variant of Hearts. When the game is first loaded, the user is prompted for their name, and then the game begins. The computer uses all three hands against the player. The game ends when at least one player has 100 or more points at the end of a hand. The winner is the one who has the fewest points.

=== Before the hand ===
The user is given thirteen pseudo-random playing cards, and selects any three of them to pass. For the first hand, cards are passed to the left; for the second, to the right; for the third, across; and for the fourth, the passing stage is skipped entirely, and the players keep (or "eat") their cards. On the fifth hand, the cycle starts again, passing to the left. In any case, after passing three cards, the players receive three cards, and play begins.

=== Tricks ===
As Hearts is a trick-taking game, the game progresses by tricks. Each player plays one card to a trick, which is won by the player of the highest card of the suit led. There is no trump suit.

The aim is to avoid gaining points, which are incurred by winning a trick including point cards, which are any Hearts and the Queen of Spades. Any Hearts taken incur 1 point each, and the Queen of Spades incurs 13 points.

For each hand, the player with the Two of Clubs leads first, and they must play that card. Subsequent leads are by the winner of the last trick. For tricks after the first, any card can be led, except that a Heart cannot be led until Hearts have been "broken". Hearts are broken with the first Heart played in the hand, which can be done in only two situations:

1. A player who did not lead a trick may play a Heart to it if they cannot follow suit (and it is not the first trick in the hand);
2. A player with only Hearts left in their hand may lead with a Heart.

Players must follow the suit led if able to (with any card of their choice in that suit) - otherwise they may play any card, except that a point card cannot be played to the first trick in each hand. Notwithstanding the above rules, in the highly improbable event that a player receives all thirteen Hearts as their hand, or twelve Hearts and the Queen of Spades, then a heart card may be played in the first trick.

The concept of revoking, failing to follow suit when able, does not exist in the computer version of Hearts. In real-life card play there is a penalty for any revoke that is discovered to have taken place; in the computer version the computer does not permit players to revoke and instructs the player to follow suit.

=== After the hand ===
Any players who took point cards incur the appropriate points for those, which are added to their previous score. But any player who succeeds in taking all point cards (worth 26 points) has successfully "shot the moon", and they incur no points, while the other players incur 26 points each.

After each hand, a scoreboard shows the current and previous scores of all four players, with the current leader's (or leaders') score written in blue. Each of the players has in front of them all of the point cards accumulated during the preceding trick, for easy identification of who got how many points (and a quick check to see if a player shot the moon). The game ends when one player reaches 100 or more points, and the winner is the player with the lowest score. A tie is possible if two or more players have the equal lowest score, and if the human player is one of them, the computer credits him or her as the winner.

When the game ends, the score of the winning player(s) is shown in red. A new game then begins.

=== Number of hands per game ===
In average play, between six and ten hands may be played before one player loses, i.e. reaches or exceeds 100 points. The maximum number of hands that can be played before any player reaches 100 points is 16. This is very difficult, though not impossible, to achieve playing Internet (Microsoft) Hearts.

== See also ==
- List of games included with Windows
