= Hobardzi =

Hobardzi Հոբարձի
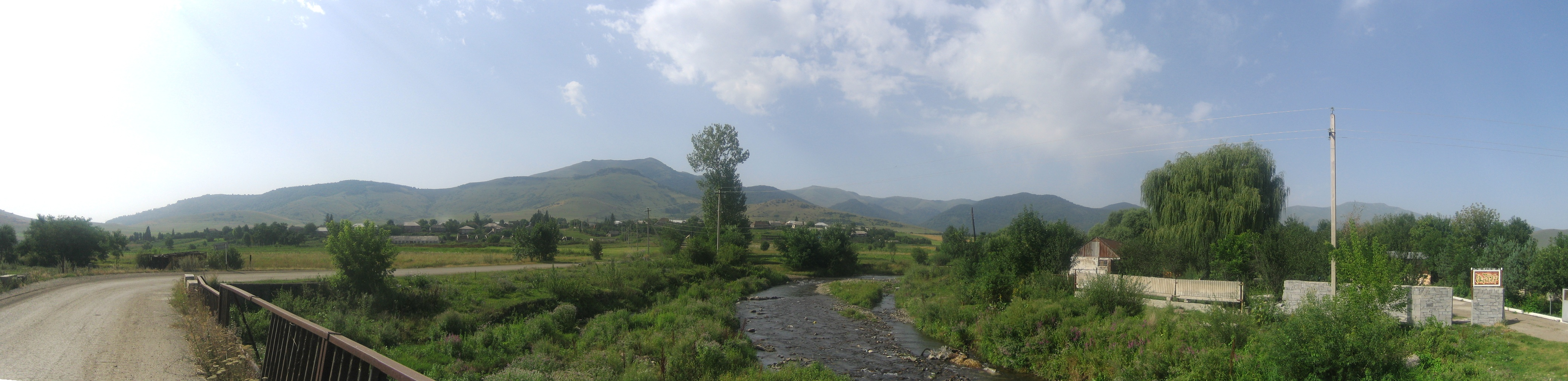
- Panorama of Hobardzi from the main road into the village

- Location within Armenia
- Coordinates: 40°57′37″N 44°29′39″E
- Country: Armenia
- Province: Lori
- Elevation: 1,345 m (4,413 ft)

Population (2011)
  - Total: 736
- Time zone: UTC+4 (AMT)

Hobardzi (Armenian: Հոբարձի) is a village in the Lori Province of Armenia.

The village is located about 11 km (6.8 mi) south-east of Stepanavan and is close to the villages of Vardablur and Gyulagarak. The Stepanavan Dendropark is located about 3 km (1.9 mi) southwest of Hobardzi.

== Gallery ==
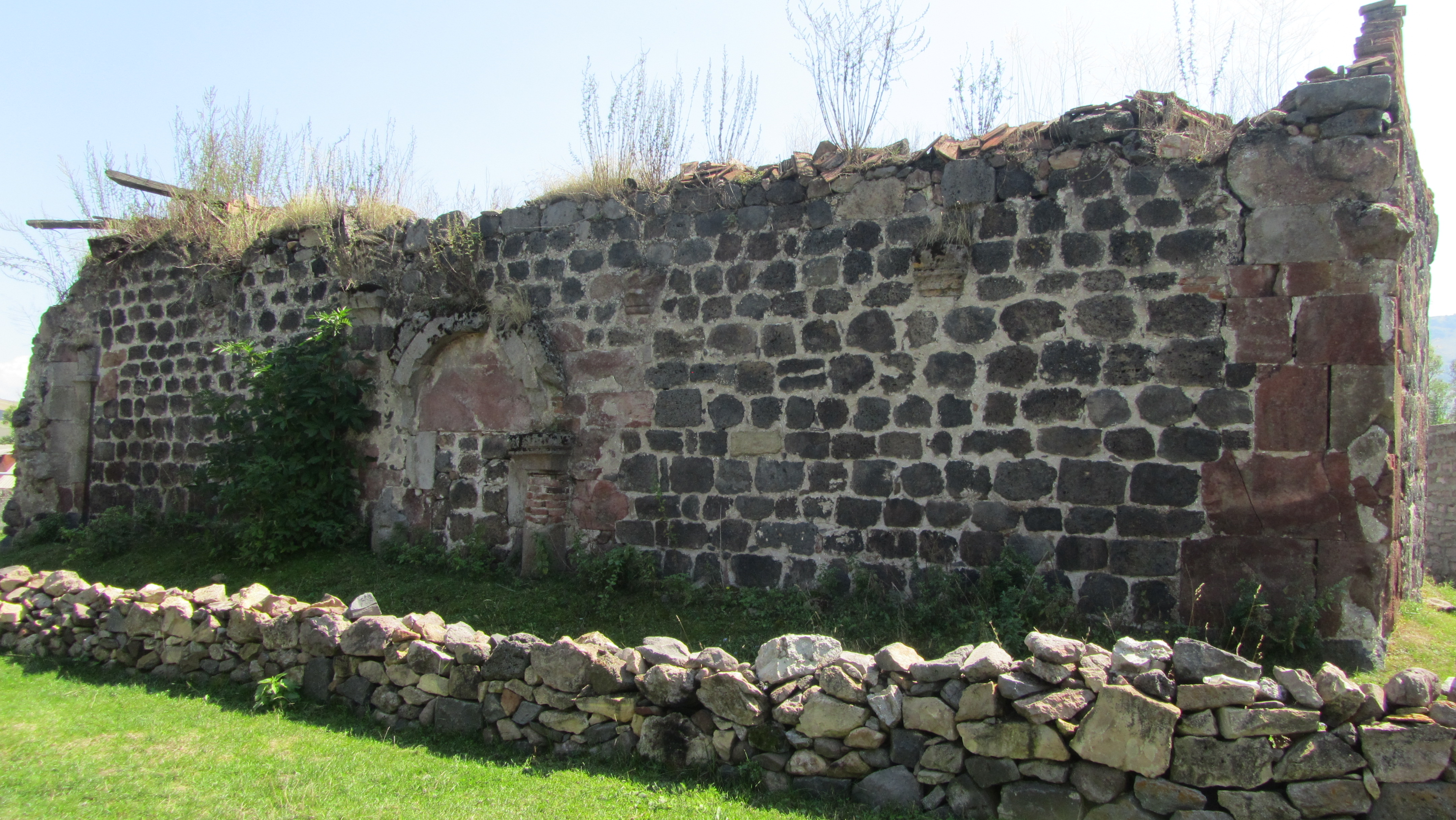
Hobardzi Church
