= Getavan =

Getavan may refer to:

- Getavan, Armenia
- Getavan, Azerbaijan
