= Sahak Sahakyan =

Armenian sculptor

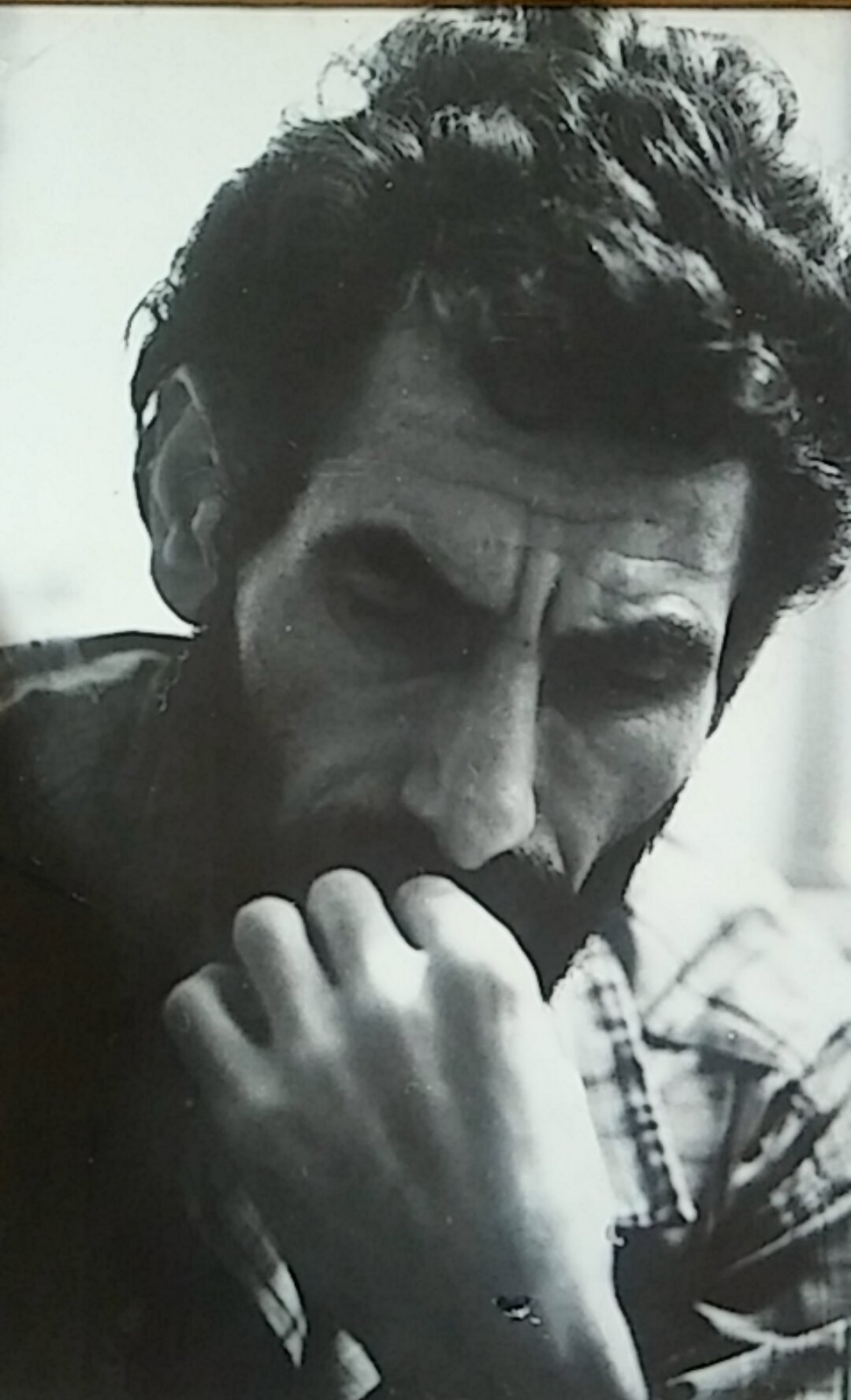
Sahak Sahakyan, Armenian artist

Sahak Hovhannesi Sahakyan (Armenian: Սահակ Սահակյան, September 7, 1929, Stepanavan, Lori Province, Republic of Armenia- July 13, 2010, Yerevan) was an Armenian sculptor, artist and participant in World War II.

== Life and career ==
Sahak Sahakyan was an Armenian artist known for his contributions to various art forms, including sculpture, painting, drawing, and applied arts. He participated in exhibitions in Armenia, the Soviet Union, and internationally, receiving several awards and honors for his work. Sahakyan's art often featured humanistic themes, reflecting his love for his country and people, as well as his civic engagement and sense of humor. He is also recognized for his role in the development of Armenian art dolls, using wooden logs and natural dyes to create pieces inspired by traditional Armenian attire.

== Military service in World War II ==
Sahak Sahakyan participated in World War II, volunteering for frontline duty in 1941. He serving in the 663rd Rifle Regiment, where he engaged in pivotal battles for Novorossiysk, Tuapse, and Gelendzhik. In 1942–1943, he sustained serious injuries on the front lines, leading to his transfer to the Tbilisi hospital, located in the former Nersisyan school building. Following his recovery, Sahakyan continued his service as a private in the rifle battalion of the 42692nd military unit. In recognition of his valor, he was honored with several medals and orders.
