= Gargar, Armenia =

Gargar Գարգառ
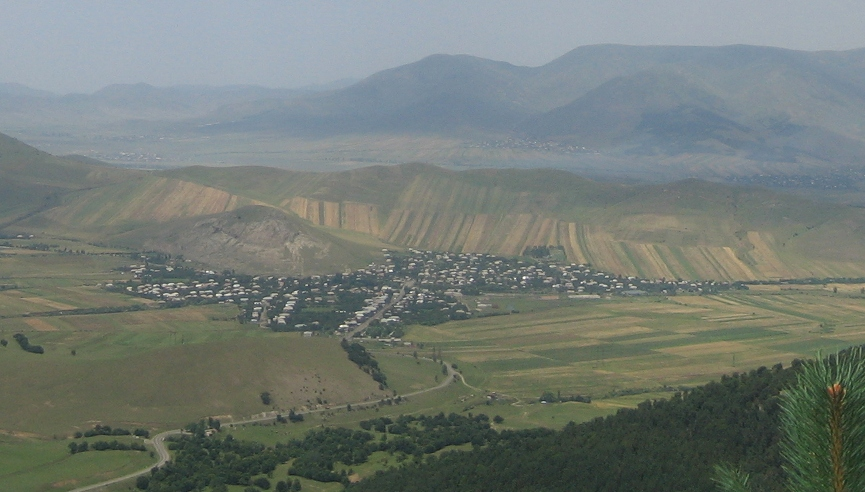
- Gargar as seen from the Pushkin mountain pass

- Location within Armenia
- Coordinates: 40°57′25″N 44°26′34″E
- Country: Armenia
- Province: Lori
- Established: 1790

Government
  - Mayor: Gor Aghajanyan

Area
  - Total: 14.58 km^{2} (5.63 sq mi)
- Elevation: 1,410 m (4,630 ft)

Population (2011)
  - Total: 1,478
- Time zone: UTC+4 (AMT)

Gargar (Armenian: Գարգառ) is a village in the Lori Province of Armenia.

== History ==
The village was founded in 1790. After Lori became part of Tsarist Russia in 1801, many families abandoned their settlements and permanently inhabited the villages in Lori. The founding families of the village are the Kalashyans, Muradyans, Zalinyans and Harutyunyans.

=== Historical heritage sites ===
==== Amenaprkich ====
While escaping from their enemies during a war that ravaged their lands in the 19th century, a group of villagers took shelter in a small hut. Despite many attempts by the enemy to breach the hut, it stood intact. As a result of their miraculous survival, the villagers created this pilgrimage site and named it "Amenaprkitch" which essentially translates to "Savior of all." According to their folklore, every wish that you make here will come true.

==== Surp Nshan ====
According to their local history, "some pilgrims sat by the side of a road to rest while passing through this part of the village. One night one of the pilgrims dreamt that light descended from the sky upon this very place. The pilgrims returned to the exact location and built a shrine here, naming it “Sur Nshan” which translates to "Holy Sign".

==== Surp Hovhannes Church ====
Surp Hovhannes Church was built in 1905–1907; it was built by Greek and Armenian architects with the funds of the villagers. The church bell was brought from Tula, Russia and is still found in the church. Many typical religious rituals still take place in the church: Christmastide, baptisms, weddings, and so on.

== Geography and climate ==
Gargar is located 1,400–1,500 meters above sea level. The Yerevan-Tbilisi highway crosses through the village. Climate conditions are favorable. The village is surrounded with high mountains, thick forests and they provide 50% of the village with drinking water. It is because of the lack of proper water pipes that the village is not secured with 100% drinking water. It is typically very cold in the winters, with mild temperatures in the summers.

== Economy and culture ==
The village is rich with pastures and recently the villagers have also made use of the "pordzadasht", where people cultivate crops atypical to the surrounding territories such as broccoli, physalis, pattypan squash, etc. Villagers mostly cultivate potatoes and wheat, and farmers mostly produce milk, honey, eggs and wool.

The village has a secondary school which is located in the kindergarten building. The community also has cultural house, which was renovated in 2011. There is a fully functioning first aid clinic, which was built with the help of Red Cross in the early 1990s.

The village is close to the Stepanavan Dendropark, which attracts local and foreign visitors.

== Demographics ==
Year	1831	1886	1926	1939	1959	1970	1979	2001	2004	2011
Population	158	1,005	1,600	1,523	1,313	1,431	1,395	1,546	1,318	1,478

== Gallery ==
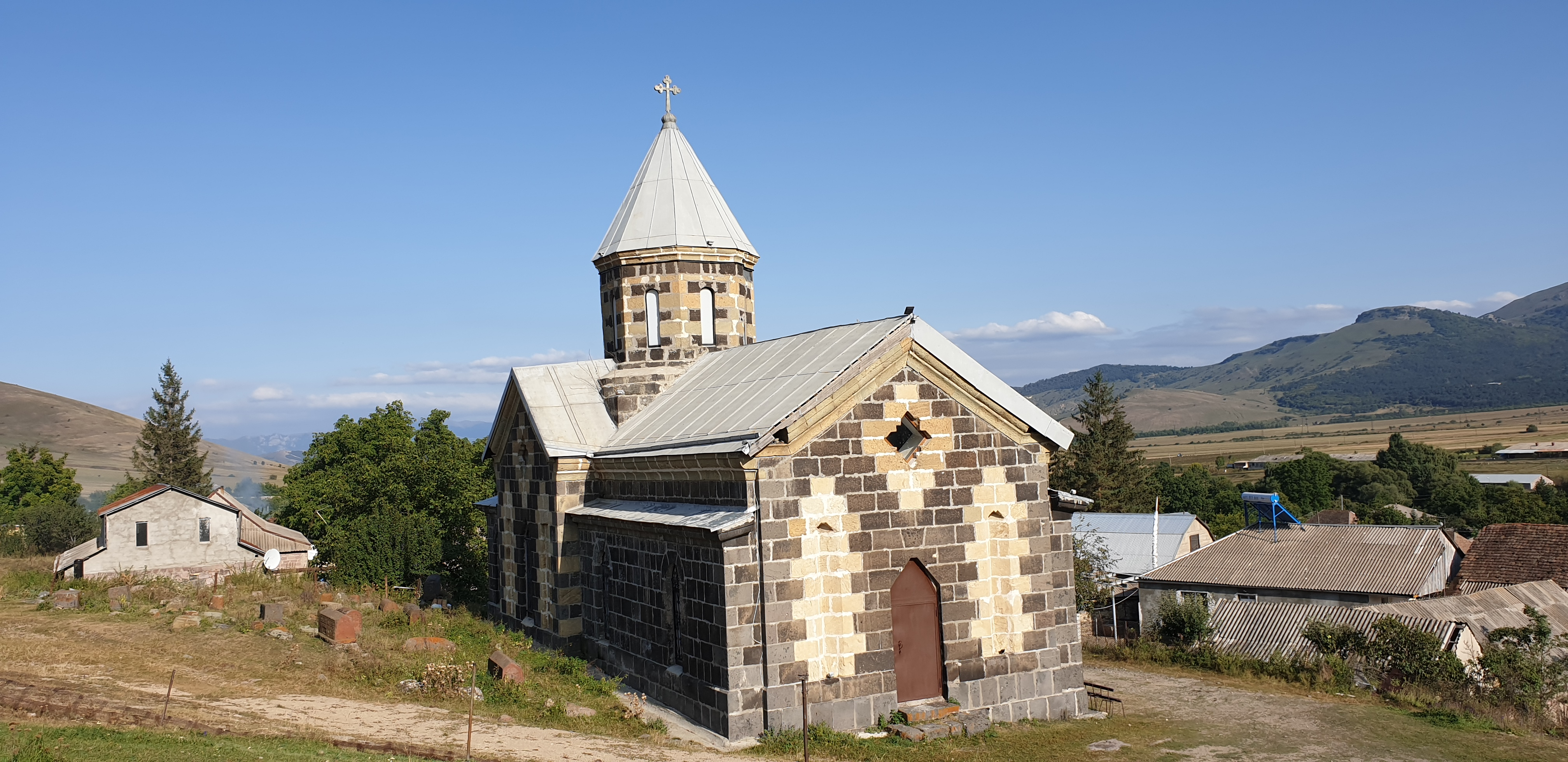

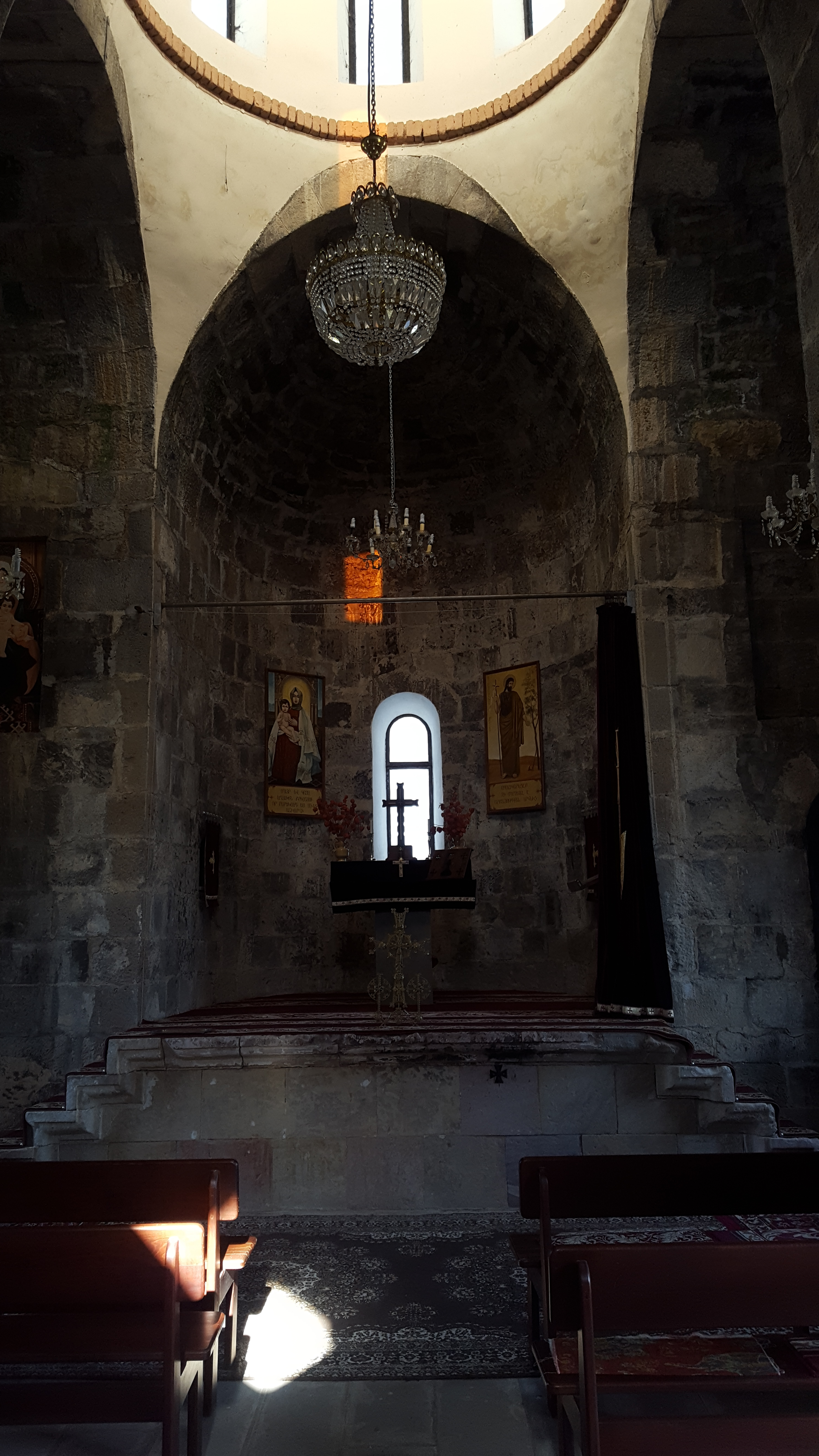

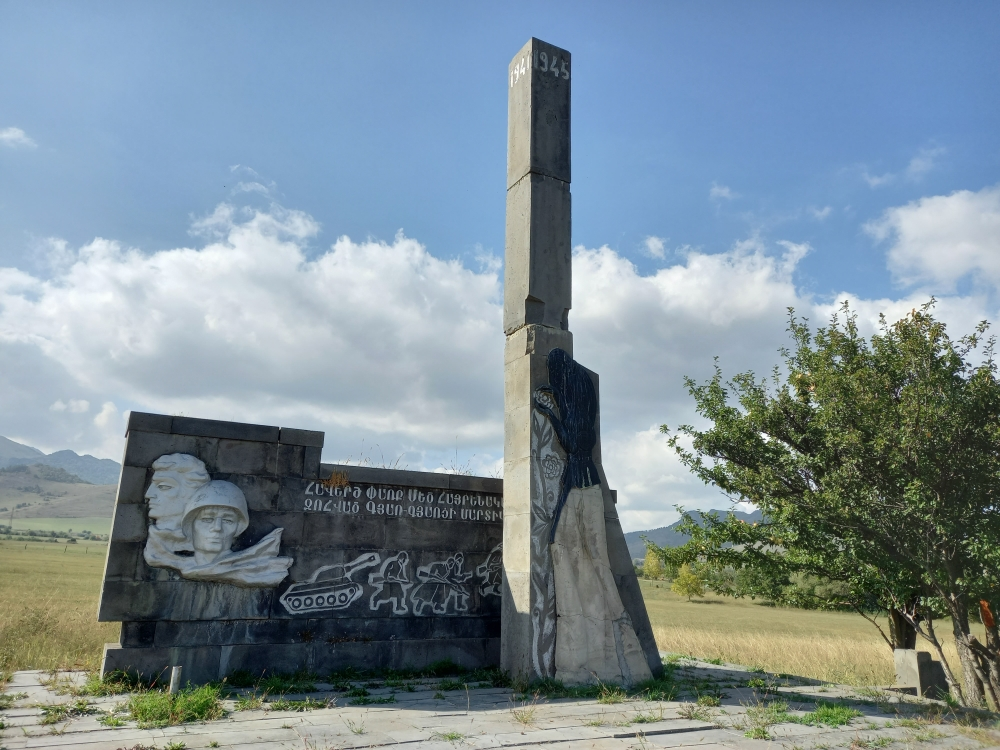

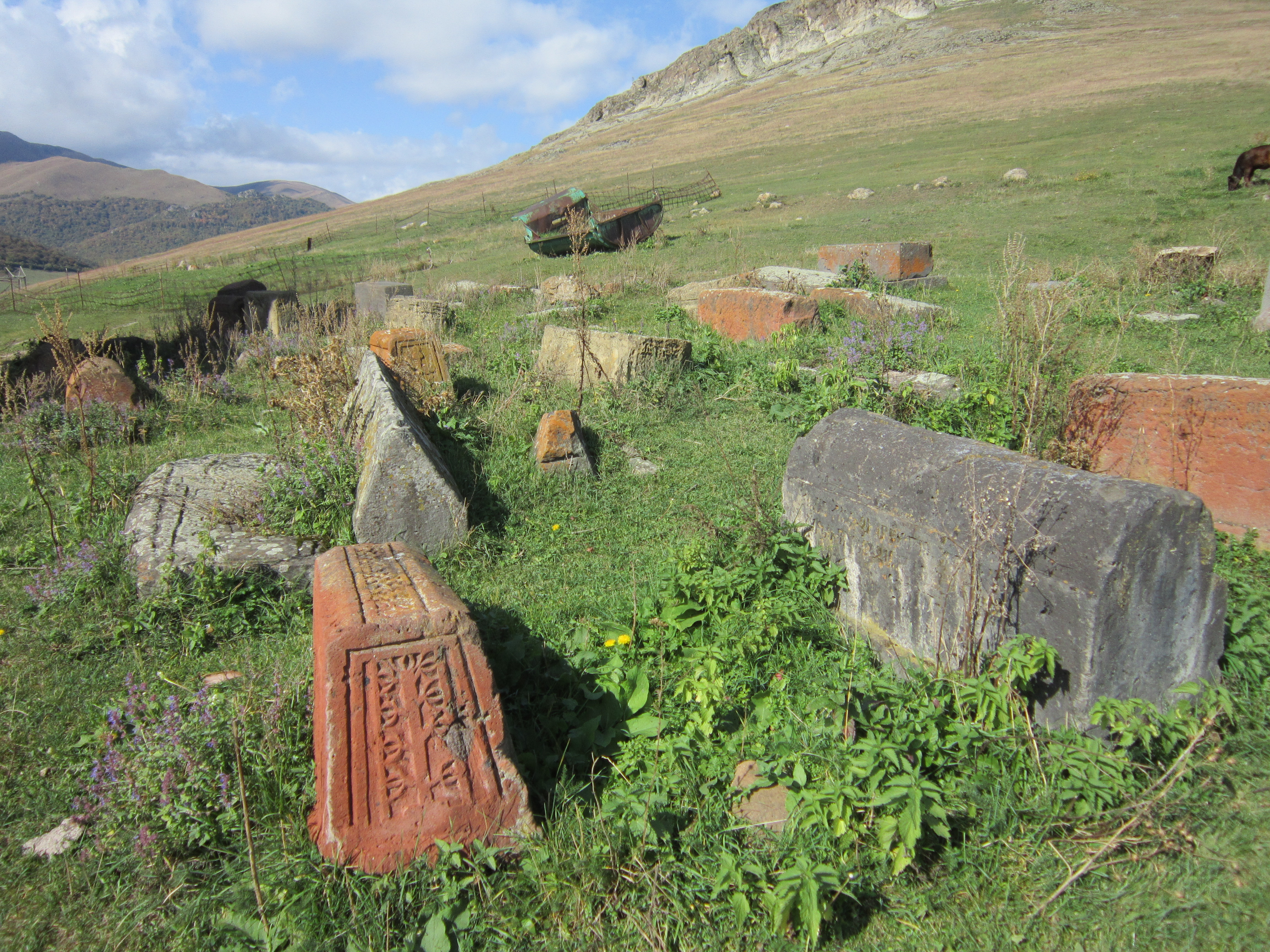

== Notable people ==
- Hrachya Ghaplanyan (Hrachya Ghaplanyan Drama Theatre in Yerevan is named after him)
- Viktor Balayan
