= SkiFree =

1991 skiing video game

- Icon
- Developer: Chris Pirih
- Publishers: Microsoft; GearSprout (iOS)
- Platforms: Windows; Game Boy Color; iOS
- Release: Windows: October 1991; Game Boy Color: May 2001; iOS: January 2013 (Note: GearSprout released the game as SkeeFree beforehand to avoid trademark infringement. After the SkiFree trademark expired, the game was updated in 2013 as SkiFree.)
- Genres: Sports, casual
- Mode: Single-player

SkiFree is a single-player skiing video game created by Chris Pirih and released with Microsoft Entertainment Pack 3 for Windows 3.0 in October 1991. The player controls a skier on a mountain slope, avoiding obstacles while racing against time or performing stunts for points, depending on the game mode.

SkiFree was well-received upon release, with critics focusing on its simplicity and graphics. The game was later ported to Game Boy Color and iOS. Pirih also released a free, updated 32-bit Windows version in 2005 after rediscovering the original source code. SkiFree remains popular among the gaming community and is often remembered for its Abominable Snowman, which pursues the player after they finish a full run.

In 2020, Microsoft released Surf, a game included with Microsoft Edge heavily inspired by SkiFree. A winter skin where the player skis instead of surfs and must run from the SkiFree Abominable Snowman was added to the game in 2021.

== Gameplay ==
The player steers the skier around trees and rocks and is about to be pursued by the Abominable Snow Monster. The colorful bars represent the ramps, and the top right box shows elapsed time, meters traveled, current speed, and "Style" score.

SkiFree is a casual single-player sports simulator wherein the player uses the keyboard or the mouse to control a skier across a white background representing snow on a mountainside. The object of the game is to ski down an endless slope and avoid the obstacles (trees, stumps, dogs, etc.). The player can also opt to take part in three modes: slalom, freestyle, and tree slalom. In slalom, players must properly ski around flags in an attempt to complete the run with the shortest time possible. Tree slalom adds obstacles to the slalom run. In freestyle, players ski downhill and jump off ramps while racking up points by performing tricks. Deductions are imposed for colliding into obstacles or failing to land properly after a stunt. When the player passes the 2,000-meter mark, the Abominable Snowman appears and starts to chase the player, eating them when it catches them.

== Development ==
While SkiFree creator Chris Pirih was a student at the University of Puget Sound, he wrote a text-based game called Ski in Fortran for the VAX/VMS operating system, inspired by Activision's Atari 2600 game Skiing. Later, as a programmer for Microsoft he was writing programming utilities used in the development of software such as Microsoft Word and Microsoft Excel. He had been focused on developing for the OS/2 operating system, but in 1991 decided to learn to write for the newly released Windows 3.0, and so created a new version of his skiing game in the programming language C, replacing the text-based environment with graphics. He called the game WinSki, and added exploitable, fanciful elements to demonstrate the new operating system's functionality, such as staining the snow yellow after crashing into numerous dogs and certain tree stumps transforming into mushrooms when skied on backwards.

SkiFree was based on Chris Pirih's earlier title, a text-based VAX/VMS game titled Ski. The circumflexes (^) are trees and the slashes represent the direction of the skis as they turn to the left side of the screen.

Although he developed it on his home computer for his own education and entertainment, WinSki attracted the attention of a program manager for the Microsoft Entertainment Pack (MEP) when he noticed Pirih playing it at work. At that time, the first MEP had become so successful that the MEP team was designing two more. In October 1991, Microsoft shipped MEPs 2 and 3 for Windows 3.0, the latter pack containing Pirih's game renamed and marketed by Microsoft as SkiFree. It was distributed on Verbatim 3.5-inch GameSampler floppy disks, bundled with packs of 10 other blank floppy disks in the early 1990s.

== Ports ==
In Microsoft's 2020 game Surf, a limited time theme allows the player to play the game in the style of SkiFree, complete with the Abominable Snowman.

Since its debut, SkiFree has seen several ports and rereleases. SkiFree was featured in The Best of Microsoft Entertainment Pack in 1994, and was also one of seven games included in the Game Boy Color version of the compilation released in May 2001. On April 4, 2005, Pirih announced the creation and release of a 32-bit version of SkiFree on his website for free, after rediscovering the game's source code that year, which he had lost when he was developing a second version of the game in 1993, leading to its abandonment for other projects.

In January 2013, mobile games developer GearSprout developed and released iOS ports of SkiFree and Rodent's Revenge. The company had already released SkeeFree, a skiing game with identical assets. In a Destructoid interview with GearSprout co-founder Tommy Tornroos, he explained that the company contacted Microsoft about porting their titles, and Microsoft responded that they were "no longer claiming rights" to them. However, the SkiFree trademark was reserved by an unspecified entity, leading to the release of SkeeFree. The SkiFree trademark later expired, and the name of the GearSprout game was updated as SkiFree when it was released alongside Rodent's Revenge. SkiFree was included in The Windows 3.x Showcase and uploaded to the Internet Archive in February 2016, becoming the most popular item on the website within a week.

In May 2020, Microsoft released Surf, a surfing-themed game inspired by SkiFree into its Microsoft Edge browser, accessible by typing the special URL edge://surf on the address bar. It is also available when the browser is disconnected from the Internet, in a similar vein to the Dinosaur Game on Google Chrome. A 2021 update changed the game to depict a skier who is chased by the SkiFree Abominable Snowman instead of the game's usual kraken.

== Reception ==
SkiFree attained a cult status in the PC community. In his 1992 review for MEPs 2 and 3, Richard Mansfield of Game Player's PC Entertainment favorably rated them as "visually sophisticated and...entertaining" as the first Pack. While ranking Klotski as the best of the packs and only noting SkiFree as a "simple skiing simulation", he recommended all of the sixteen games and praised each of them for taking advantage of effects that "show off the visual beauty that Windows can bring to a computer." In another 1992 review, Barry Simon of PC Magazine described the game's graphics as humorous and "not very extensive", and while he chose Pipe Dream of Entertainment Pack 2 as the game to purchase as a standalone title, at a bargain of US$5 per title, he recommended both of the packs. Computer Gaming World described the MEP franchise as providing short gaming experiences, and noted its lead in the "gaming lite" category. By September 1992, the first three MEPs sold a total of over 500,000 copies.

SkiFree continues to receive critical acclaim in retrospective reviews. Josh Augustine of PC Gamer cited it as one of his favorite games of his childhood. Lisa Foiles of The Escapist ranked it No. 1 on its list of Top 5 Ski / Snowboard Games, calling it an "undeniable classic." Computer Power User described the game as a "killer app", noting that SkiFree was not particularly groundbreaking, but as one of the MEP 3 titles, it "stood apart from Minesweeper and the various card and board-game translations that dominated the software bundles." Brittany Vincent of PC Gamer characterized it as an endless runner, rationalizing that SkiFree had no ending and that the course would loop to the top of the map when players reached the bottom. In another PC Gamer article highlighting the history of trees in video gaming, Matt Elliott characterized the game's trees as "mean, twisted little saplings" that threaten to ruin the player's course. Games journalist Alfie Bown described the way other popular Windows games required concentration or mental energy, playing into the operating system's reputation for usefulness and productivity. He contrasted it with the "totally anachronistic" SkiFree, a more casual "subversive alternative."

Retrospective reviews for SkiFree frequently focus on the obscure nature of the Abominable Snow Monster. Benj Edwards of PC Magazine rated SkiFree as the best of MEP 3 because of the humorous inclusion of the Abominable Snow Monster. James Kozanitis of Hardcore Gamer rated it No. 2 on their Top 5 Yetis in Video Games list. Alec Meer of Rock, Paper, Shotgun opined that the Monster changed the tone of the game from being a sports game to being "the world's most dangerous sport", where the only ending condition is the Monster's devouring the skier. Vincent noted fan theories that attempt to explain the Monster's background, as well as theories on how to supposedly outrun it (apart from pressing the F key to accelerate beyond the normal limits).
