= Surf (video game) =

2020 video game included in Microsoft's Edge browser

- Screenshot of Surf, from Microsoft Edge for macOS
- Developer: Microsoft
- Publisher: Microsoft
- Platform: Microsoft Edge
- Release: May 21, 2020
- Genres: Casual, sports

Surf is a 2020 offline browser game developed by Microsoft that is shipped with the Microsoft Edge web browser. In the game, the player must control a surfer as they move across a body of water while also collecting power-ups and evading obstacles and a kraken. The game features four game modes (Endless, Time trial, Zigzag and Collector), has character customization, and supports keyboard, mouse, touch and gamepad controls. When customizing the character, a penguin that resembles Tux can be used. The player can also zoom out using the browser settings to cheat in the game.

Like Google Chrome's Dinosaur Game, Surf is accessible from the browser's offline error page and can also be accessed by entering edge://surf into the Edge address bar. Its gameplay has been frequently compared to the 1991 video game SkiFree. Microsoft also hosts a version with limited features that is playable from any modern web browser. The game is also included with the Android and iOS versions of Edge. Users can also play the game while waiting for Windows 11 setup to finish.

In the skiing theme, the player is chased by the Abominable Snowman from SkiFree.

In 2021, a limited-time only seasonal theme was added that changed the surfer to a skier on a snowy mountain as a homage to SkiFree. The kraken was also replaced by the Abominable Snowman (Yeti), also from SkiFree.

== See also ==
- SkiFree
- Dinosaur Game
- List of games included with Windows
- List of Easter eggs in Microsoft products
