= Microsoft Edge =

Web browser developed by Microsoft

- Screenshot of Microsoft Edge, showing the Main Page of the English Wikipedia
- Original author: Microsoft
- Developer: Microsoft
- Release: January 15, 2020; 6 years ago

Stable release(s)
- Windows, macOS, Linux (Note: Beginning in April 2026, Microsoft Copilot for Windows shares the same codebase as Edge, and therefore also adopts Edge's version numbering.): 158.0.4370.33 / 19 November 2026; 2 days ago
- Android: 157.0.4341.53 / 11 November 2026; 10 days ago
- iOS, iPadOS, visionOS: 157.0.4341.57 / 16 November 2026; 5 days ago

Preview release(s)
- Windows, macOS, Linux: 159.0.4402.13 / 19 November 2026; 2 days ago
- Android: 159.0.4402.10 / 19 November 2026; 2 days ago
- iOS, iPadOS, visionOS: 159.0.4402.10 / 19 November 2026; 2 days ago
- Written in: C++, JavaScript, TypeScript, HTML, CSS, Rust, Java (Android only), Swift (iOS/iPadOS/visionOS only)
- Engines: Android: Blink; iOS/iPadOS/visionOS: WebKit; macOS: Blink; Microsoft Windows: Blink, MSHTML (IE mode for legacy websites); Linux: Blink; Xbox One: Blink; Xbox Series X/S: Blink
- Operating system: Android 10 or later; iOS 18 or later; iPadOS 18 or later; visionOS 1.0 or later; Linux (specifically Ubuntu, Debian, Fedora, and openSUSE distributions); macOS 13 or later; Windows 10 or later; Xbox system software – September 2021 update or later
- Platform: IA-32, x86-64, ARM32, ARM64
- Included with: Windows 10 v20H2 or later; Windows 11; Xbox system software – September 2021 update or later
- Predecessor: Microsoft Edge Legacy (2015)
- License: Proprietary software, based on an open source project (Note: Edge's WebKit & Blink layout engines and its V8 JavaScript engine are each free and open-source software, while its other components are each either open-source or proprietary.)
- Website: microsoft.com/edge

Microsoft Edge is a proprietary cross-platform web browser created by Microsoft and based on the Chromium open-source project, superseding Edge Legacy. In Windows 11, Edge is the only browser available from Microsoft. However, a bypass is available to open Internet Explorer.

First made available only for Android and iOS in 2017, in late 2018, Microsoft announced it would completely rebuild Edge as a Chromium-based browser with Blink and V8 engines, which allowed the browser to be ported from Windows 10 to macOS and Linux. The new Edge was publicly released in January 2020, and on Xbox as well as Linux in 2021. Edge was also available on Windows 7 and 8/8.1 until early 2023.

By 2022, Edge was used by 11% of PCs worldwide. In February 2023, according to StatCounter, Microsoft Edge became the third most popular browser in the world, behind Safari and Chrome, while as of January 2025, Edge is second most popular PC/desktop web browser with Safari sliding to 3rd place.

== Features ==
The new Microsoft Edge is the default web browser, replacing Edge Legacy.

In Windows 11, Edge is the only browser available from Microsoft (for compatibility with Google Chrome). However, it includes an "Internet Explorer mode", which is aimed at fixing compatibility issues; it provides the legacy MSHTML browser engine and supports the legacy ActiveX and BHO technologies.

New Edge also has a new feature called vertical tabs which allow users to move tabs on the left side of the screen.

As of December 2022, there are over 9,000 extensions—called add-ons—available for Edge.

On February 7, 2023, Microsoft announced a major overhaul to Edge, revamping the user interface with Fluent Design, along with adding a Bing Chat (later known as Microsoft Copilot) button, which replaces the Discover button.

Microsoft also added compatibility for split screen, i.e., 2 tabs can be viewed at the same time. A new feature, "Workspaces" was introduced, which basically lets the user create different spaces for various things. These workspaces are also collaborative, users can invite friends or colleagues and seamlessly have completely separate workspace for collaboration.

=== Edge for Business ===
Starting with Edge version 116, Microsoft released Microsoft Edge for Business. A new business mode for Edge that enables end users to completely separate work and personal browsing into dedicated browser windows, in addition to offering other features aimed at admins.

=== Release channels ===
On April 8, 2019, Microsoft announced the introduction of four preview channels: Canary, Dev, Beta, and Stable and launched the Canary and Dev channels that same day with the first preview builds, for those channels, of the new Edge. Microsoft collectively calls the Canary, Dev, and Beta channels the "Microsoft Edge insider channels". As a result, Edge updates were decoupled from new versions of Windows. Major versions of Edge Stable are now scheduled for release every 4 weeks, closely following Chromium version releases.

=== Surf (video game) ===
Screenshot of Surf being played on Microsoft Edge for macOS

In May 2020, an update to Microsoft Edge added Surf, a browser game where players control a surfer attempting to evade obstacles and collect power-ups. Similar to Google Chrome's Dinosaur Game, Surf is accessible from the browser's offline error page and can also be accessed by entering edge://surf into the address bar. The game features three game modes (classic, time trial, and slalom), has character customization, and supports keyboard, mouse, touch, and gamepad controls. Its gameplay has been compared to the 1991 Microsoft video game SkiFree.

In 2021, Surf was updated with limited-time seasonal theming resembling SkiFree. Instead of surfing, the player skis down a mountain while being chased by a yeti.

== Development ==
In November 2017, Microsoft released ports of Edge for Android and iOS. The apps feature integration and synchronization with the desktop version on Windows PCs. Due to platform restrictions and other factors, these ports did not use the same layout engine as the current desktop version at the time (Edge Legacy) and instead use OS-native Blink and WebKit-based engines.

Codenamed "Anaheim", on December 6, 2018, Microsoft announced its intent to base Edge on the Chromium source code, using the same browser engine as Google Chrome but with enhancements developed by Microsoft. It was also announced that there will be versions of Edge available for older Windows versions, including Windows 7 and Windows 8/8.1, and macOS, plus that all versions will be updated on a more frequent basis. According to Microsoft executive Joe Belfiore, the decision for the change came after CEO Satya Nadella told the team in 2017 that the product needed to be better and pushed for replacing its in-house rendering engine with an open source one.

Microsoft Edge running on macOS

On April 8, 2019, the first builds of the new Edge for Windows were released to the public. On May 20, 2019, the first preview builds of Edge for macOS were released to the public, marking the first time in 13 years that a Microsoft browser was available on the Mac platform. The last time a Microsoft browser was available on the Mac platform was Internet Explorer for Mac, which was withdrawn in January 2006.

On June 18, 2019, IAmA post on Reddit, an Edge developer stated that it was theoretically possible for a Linux version to be developed in the future, but no work had actually started on that possibility. On June 19, 2019, Microsoft made Edge available on old Windows versions for testing. Then on August 20, 2019, Microsoft made its first beta build of Edge available for Windows and macOS. At Microsoft Ignite, the company revealed the brand new, wave-like logo for Edge.

The new Edge was released on January 15, 2020, and was gradually rolled out to all Windows 10 users. The new Edge was also rolled out to Windows users via Windows Update. Windows Vista and earlier were not supported at the time Edge started supporting older Windows versions.

On September 22, 2020, Microsoft announced that a beta version of Edge for Linux would be available in preview form in October 2020. This comes after the company announced in November 2019 that a Linux version would be developed and confirmed in May 2020 that the Linux version was in development. The first preview build for Linux was released on October 20, 2020.

Full support for the new Edge on older Windows versions was scheduled to end on January 15, 2022, but was later extended to January 15, 2023.

On April 29, 2022, Microsoft announced integrated VPN support for Microsoft Edge, coming in line with this privacy feature with Chrome and Firefox. There will be a free version of the integrated Edge VPN available but is limited to 1 GB of data transfer.

On November 14, 2024, Microsoft announced that they will drop support for CPUs that lack the SSE3 instruction set with the release of Edge version 128.

As of March 2, 2025, the Edge Canary channel has begun automatically disabling Manifest V2 extensions, notably impacting the uBlock Origin extension. However, thus far, they can be manually turned back on, and this doesn't affect the Dev, Beta, and Stable channels. This move, part of the transition to Manifest V3 (first imposed by Google in Google Chrome and subsequently in Chromium), has sparked notable debate among privacy advocates and users.

== Reception ==
Microsoft's switch to Blink as Edge's engine has faced mixed reception. The move increases the consistency of web platform compatibility between major browsers. For this reason, the move has attracted criticism, as it reduces diversity in the overall web browser market and increases the influence of Google on the overall browser market by Microsoft ceding its independently developed browser engine.

Edge sends the images that the users view online to Microsoft servers by default, although Microsoft has stated that it encrypts images before transfer. According to Douglas J. Leith, a computer science professor from Trinity College, Dublin, Microsoft Edge is among the least private browsers. He explained, "from a privacy perspective Microsoft Edge and Yandex are much more worrisome than the other browsers studied. Both send identifiers that are linked to the device hardware and so persist across fresh browser installs and can also be used to link different apps running on the same device. Edge sends the hardware UUID of the device to Microsoft, a strong and enduring identifier that cannot be easily changed or deleted." In response, a spokesperson from Microsoft Edge explained that it uses user diagnostic data to improve the product.

In June 2020, users criticized newly released Windows updates that installed Edge and imported some user data from Chrome and Firefox prior to obtaining user permission. Microsoft responded by stating that if a user rejects giving Edge data import permission, then Edge will delete the imported data. However, if the browser crashes before the user has a chance to reject the import, then the already imported data will not be cleared. The Verge called these "spyware tactics" and called Edge's "first run experience" a "dark pattern".

Microsoft uses proprietary URL handlers in Windows 10 and 11 to redirect URLs accessed via system search functions to Edge, deliberately ignoring the user's choice of default browser. In November 2021, a patch was released to frustrate a workaround employed by the third-party tool "EdgeDeflector", with a Microsoft spokesperson stating that search in the Windows shell is an "end-to-end customer experience" that is not designed to be modified. The developer of EdgeDeflector, Daniel Aleksandersen, called this "clearly a user-hostile move that sees Windows compromise its own product usability in order to make it more difficult to use competing products."

In November 2021, Microsoft announced that it would display integrated advertising for the buy now, pay later service Zip Pay in Edge during online purchases eligible for financing via the service, and allow users to link their Microsoft account to expedite registration for the service. Microsoft claims that it "does not collect a fee for connecting users to loan providers." This decision was met with criticism from users and the press, arguing that the feature was added bloat.

=== Controversy ===
Example of a Windows 11 prompt of Microsoft Edge "Recommended settings"

In December 2021, Microsoft began testing the display of in-browser prompts on the Google Chrome website to discourage downloading the browser. Similar prompts intended to discourage Google Chrome downloads also appear when searching for "Chrome" or "browser" on Microsoft Bing search engine. In February 2023, users reported seeing large banner advertisements for Microsoft Edge on the Chrome download page, a move that was criticized for deceptively altering part of Google's official website. In October 2023, Microsoft began testing the display of a sidebar containing a survey related to Chrome when the browser is downloaded.

In January 2026, canary builds of Microsoft Edge suggested that Microsoft was preparing to similarly discourage downloads of ChatGPT Atlas when it was made available on Windows.

=== Market share ===
Desktop/laptop browser statistics
Google Chrome	72.59%
Microsoft Edge	10.49%
Mozilla Firefox	6.02%
Safari	5.14%
Opera	1.78%
Other	3.59%
Desktop web browser market share according to StatCounter for June 2026
