= Rodent's Revenge =

1991 computer puzzle game

- Level 12
- Publisher: Microsoft
- Designer: Christopher Lee Fraley
- Platform: Windows
- Release: 1991
- Genre: Puzzle
- Mode: Single-player

Rodent's Revenge is a puzzle video game created by Christopher Lee Fraley and distributed as part of Microsoft Entertainment Pack 2 in 1991. The player takes on the role of a mouse, with the objective being to trap cats by pushing blocks around, while avoiding obstacles.

The game was re-released on App Store for iOS on January 9, 2013, along with the Skifree, which was first included in Microsoft Entertainment Pack 3 .

== Gameplay ==
To win a level, the mouse must stay alive and trap all the cats using the movable blocks. Doing so changes the cats into cheese, which the mouse can eat for extra points. The player is given three lives before the game is over.

Levels get increasingly harder, but the player is allowed to start playing at any level up to 50. If a player defeats Level 50, Level 51 will begin and so on. The difficulty of each level is determined by several factors. Sink holes trap the mouse for a few seconds. Mouse traps kill the mouse if it accidentally walks into one. Flying balls of yarn kill the mouse on contact. The number of movable blocks determine how difficult it is to trap the cats, while the unmovable blocks make it hard to move blocks around and hinder navigation.

During each level, a clock ticks away until it reaches a certain point, which is represented by a blue line. When this happens, more cats are spawned into the level, making it more difficult, but also increasing the potential reward. After the new cats have spawned, the blue line moves further around the clock and it resumes ticking.

Points are awarded for completing a level and for eating pieces of cheese. Players are awarded extra points based on how quickly they complete the level and the difficulty involved. The best scores are displayed on the high score table, which shows the best games overall and from the past 24 hours.

== See also ==
- Beast
- Bomberman
