= Stepanavan =

Stepanavan Ստեփանավան
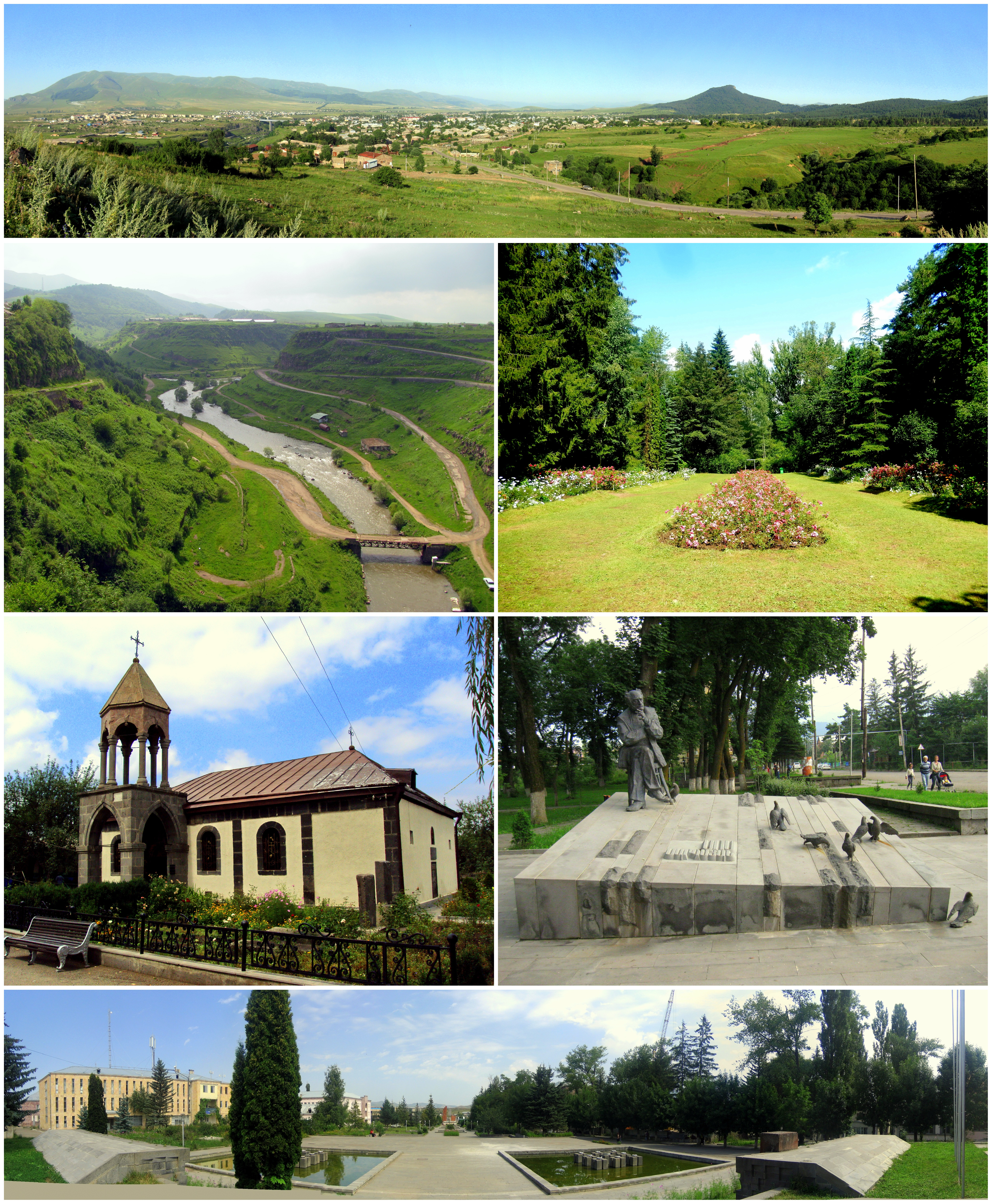
- From top left: Panoramic view of Stepanavan; Dzoraget River • Stepanavan Dendropark; Surp Sarkis Church • Memorial to Sos Sargsyan; Stepanavan central square

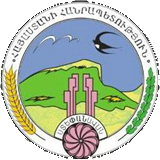
- Seal

- Location within Armenia
- Coordinates: 41°00′34.65″N 44°23′2.71″E
- Country: Armenia
- Province: Lori
- Founded: 1810

Area
  - Total: 14 km^{2} (5.4 sq mi)
- Elevation: 1,375 m (4,511 ft)

Population (2022)
  - Total: 11,982
  - Density: 860/km^{2} (2,200/sq mi)
- Time zone: UTC+4 (AMT)
- Website: stepanavan.am

Stepanavan (Armenian: Ստեփանավան) is a city and municipal community in the Lori Province of Armenia. It is located 139 km (86 mi) north of the capital Yerevan and 24 km (15 mi) north of the provincial centre Vanadzor, halfway between Yerevan and Tbilisi. As of the 2011 census, the population of the town is 13,086. Currently, the town has an approximate population of 10,800 as per the 2016 official estimate. As of the 2022 census, the population of the town is 11,982.

Due to its location on the shores of Dzoraget River among the forest of Lori plateau and Bazum mountains, Stepanavan is considered a resort town in northern Armenia.

== Etymology ==
Stepanavan was founded in 1810 as Jalaloghli, literally meaning son of Jalal in Turkic languages. The name is derived from the Armenian noble family of Hasan-Jalalyan. A khachkar-memorial in the town testifies that the settlement was founded in 1810 by prince Davit Hasan-Jalalyan. In 1923, Jalaloghli was renamed Stepanavan, meaning town of Stepan in Armenian, in honour of the bolshevik leader Stepan Shaumian.

== History ==
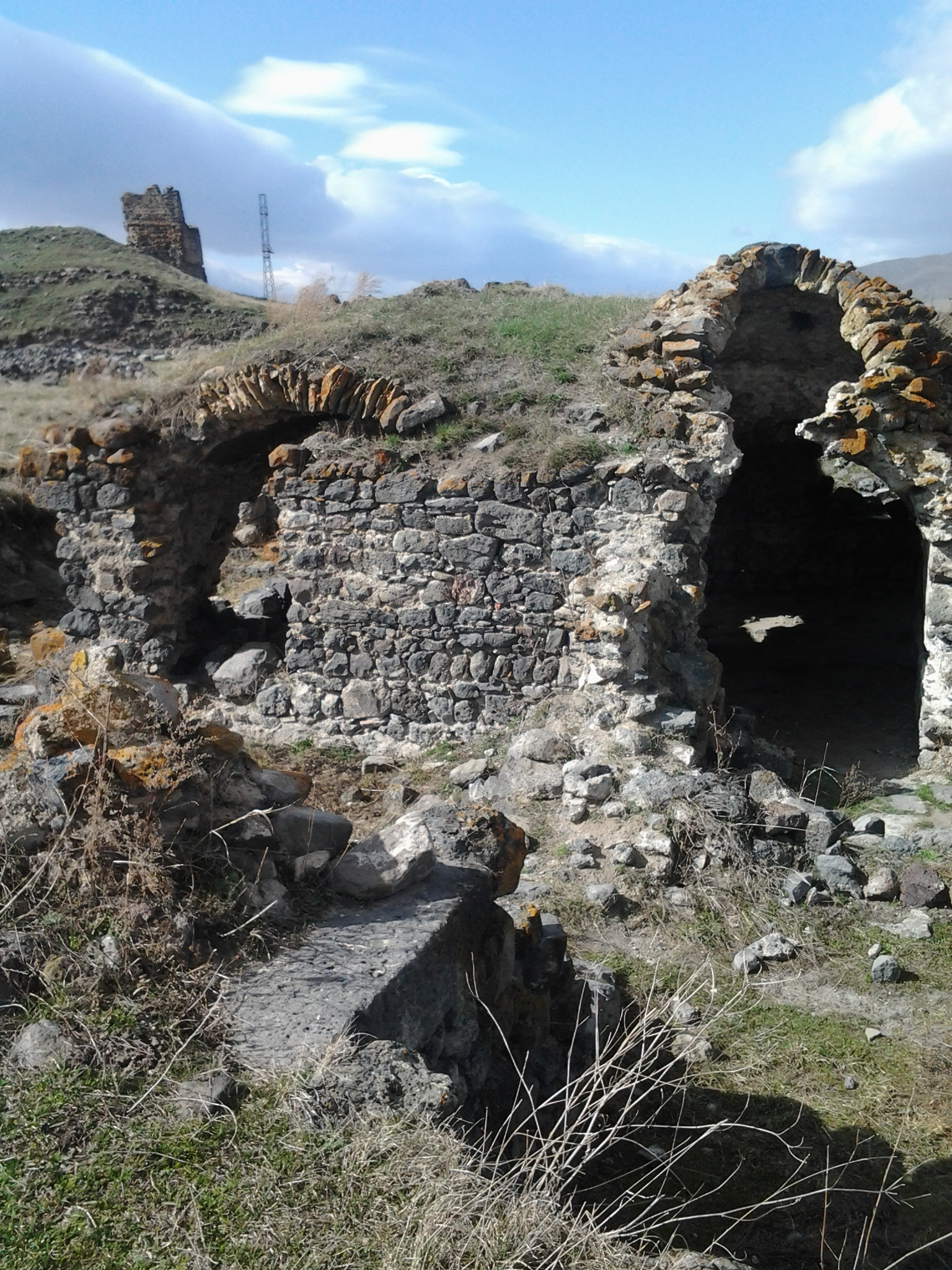
The remains of the fortress dating back to the 3rd millennium BC

The area of modern-day Stepanavan was first settled during the 4th millennium BC. The remains of an ancient fortress are found on the western edge of the town dating back to the 3rd millennium BC. Later, it became part of the Urartu Kingdom between the 8th and 6th centuries BC. After the Achaemenid invasion, the region became part of the Satrapy of Armenia between the 6th and 4th centuries BC. With the establishment of the Kingdom of Armenia in 331 BC, the region became part of the Tashir canton of Gugark; the 13th province of Greater Armenia.

Following the partition of Armenia in 387 between the Byzantine Empire and Sassanid Persia, and the subsequent collapse of Arsacid Armenia in 428, Eastern Armenia including Tashir region became under the rule of Sassanid Persia. However, the earliest records about human settlement in modern-day Stepanavan dates back to the 5th century, when the basilica of the Holy Mother of God was built on the shores of Dzoraget River (destroyed by the Soviets during the 1930s).

During the 2nd half of the 7th century, Armenia was conquered by the Arab invaders. At the end of the 9th century, Tashir became part of the newly established Bagratid Kingdom of Armenia. In 979, King Kiurike I founded the Kingdom of Tashir-Dzoraget (alternatively known as the Kingdom of Lori) under the rule of the Kiurikian dynasty and the protectorate of the Bagratid kings of Armenia. The Kiurikians ruled the kingdom until 1118 when Tashir-Dzoraget became part of the Kingdom of Georgia.

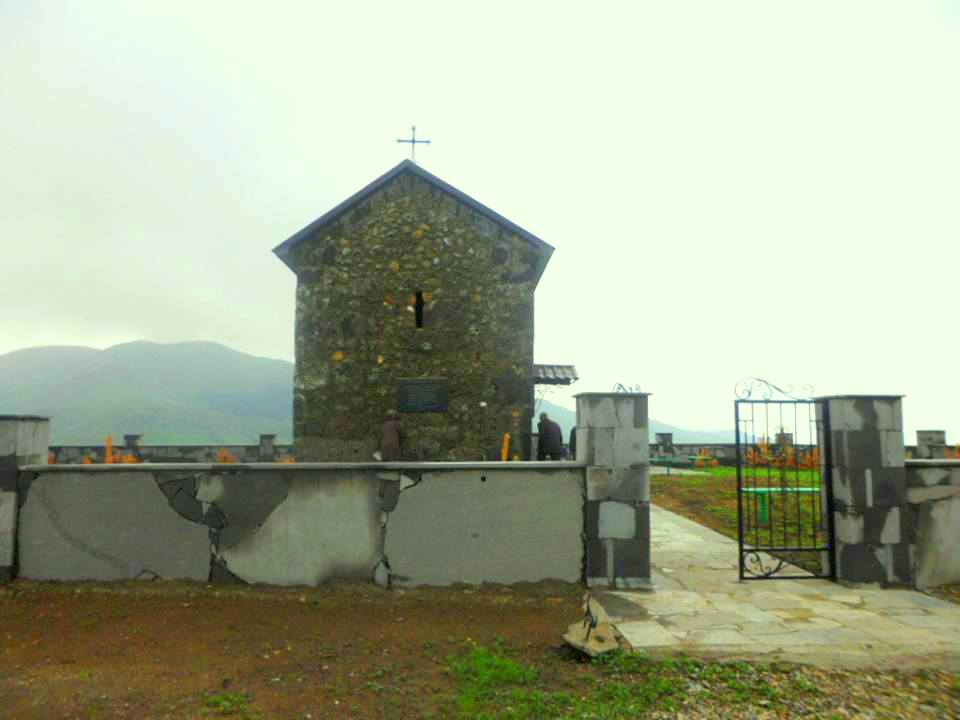
The 13th century chapel of the Holy Saviour

The Seljuks invaded the region in the early 12th century, but their rule did not last long and in 1118-1122 the Georgian king David the Builder conquered Lori and granted the rule to the Georgian-Armenian Orbelian Dynasty. The Orbelians revolted unsuccessfully in 1177, after which a Kipchak named Khubasari was appointed spasalari of Lori. Later in 1185, the province became ruled by the Zakarian dynasty after Queen Tamar of Georgia appointed the Zakarid prince Sarkis as its governor. The Holy Saviour chapel dating back to the 13th century is still found at the centre of modern-day Stepanavan. Located on the northern trade route, Tashir region turned into a significant commercial centre in medieval Armenia. However, the region was devastated by the Mongol invasion of 1236 led by Chaghatai Khan, and the Zakarian dynasty declined by the second half of the 14th century.

Tashir region was annexed by Safavid Persia as a result of the 1555 Peace of Amasya and became part of Persia's Kartli-Kakheti province. After Nader Shah's murder in 1747, the Georgian kingdoms of Kartli and Kakheti became independent and united into a single kingdom by 1762. In 1801, together with the Georgian provinces of Kartli and Kakheti, Tashir was annexed by the Russian Empire. During the reign of Catherine the Great, the town of Jalaloghly was founded in 1810, by the Armenian prince Davit Hasan-Jalalyan from Artsakh. Tashir became officially part of the Russian Empire at the Treaty of Gulistan signed on 1 January 1813 between Imperial Russia and Qajar Persia. Administratively, Jalaloghli was part of the Borchaly uezd within the Tiflis Governorate of the Russian Empire.

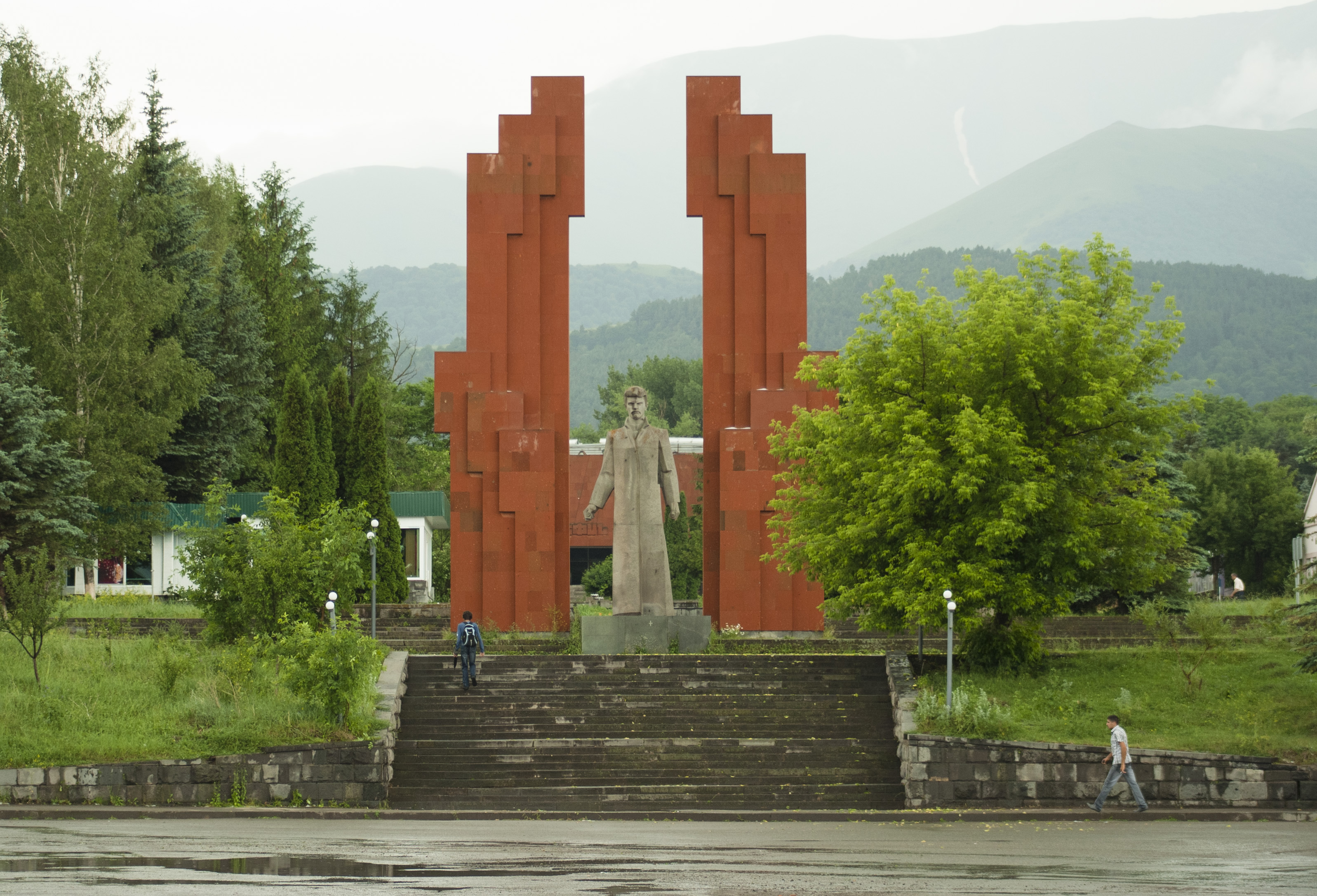
The statue of Stepan Shaumian

In May 1918, Lori became part of the newly formed Republic of Armenia. In late 1918, Armenia and Georgia fought a border war over Lori. In January 1919, the Lori neutral zone was established by the British forces. Following Armenia's sovietization in December 1920, Lori -including Jalaloghli- was finally incorporated into Soviet Armenia on 11 February 1921. In 1923, Jalaloghli was renamed Stepanavan after the Armenian Bolshevik leader Stepan Shaumian.

In 1930, Stepanavan became the centre of the newly formed Stepanavan raion. The first major plan of the town was introduces in 1957. It was revised in 1962 and 1971. Stepanavan was granted the status of a town of republican subordination in 1967. Originally built on the right bank of the Dzoraget River, Stepanavan has been expanded towards the right bank of the river as well after the devastating 1988 earthquake that left around 6000 families homeless in the town. The 2 parts of the town are connected with each other through the Stepanavan Bridge opened in 1989.

== Geography ==
Stepanavan is situated on Lori plateau to the north of Bazum mountains, on the shores of river Dzoraget at an average height of 1375 meters above sea level, covering an area of 17 km^{2}. The deep gorge of Dzoraget divides Stepanavan into northern and southern banks, the latter of which has deeper historical roots.

Surrounded with thick forests and alpine meadows, Stepanavan has a relatively humid climate with an average yearly temperature of 6.6 °C (43.9 °F). The average temperature of January is −4.2 °C (24.4 °F) while in July it makes +16.7 °C (62.1 °F). The annual precipitation is 683 mm (26.9 in) with snowy winters.

Stepanavan is a health resort known for its pine forests and mountainous climate. The essential oils, isolated by coniferous trees, possess strong bactericidal properties; therefore mountainous air of Stepanavan, filled with the aroma of pine tree, is useful for patients who suffer from respiratory problems.

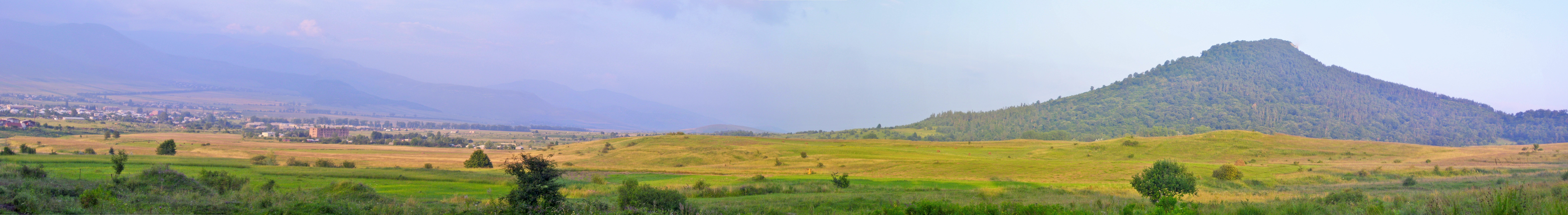
Mount Arjasar (1819 meters) overlooking the town of Stepanavan from its south

=== Climate ===
Stepanavan has a humid continental climate with Dfb designation in Köppen climate classification. The weather is cold and snowy in winter but with low precipitation, whereas there is significant precipitation in spring and summer months. Hail is a rare phenomenon which mostly happens in summer.

Climate data for Stepanavan (1991-2020)
Month	Jan	Feb	Mar	Apr	May	Jun	Jul	Aug	Sep	Oct	Nov	Dec	Year
Record high °C (°F)	17.3 (63.1)	19.0 (66.2)	23.7 (74.7)	27.8 (82.0)	28.8 (83.8)	31.0 (87.8)	35.3 (95.5)	36.8 (98.2)	32.5 (90.5)	28.7 (83.7)	21.0 (69.8)	18.3 (64.9)	36.8 (98.2)
Daily mean °C (°F)	−3.2 (26.2)	−2.2 (28.0)	2.2 (36.0)	7.1 (44.8)	11.6 (52.9)	15.3 (59.5)	18.0 (64.4)	18.0 (64.4)	14.1 (57.4)	9.3 (48.7)	3.0 (37.4)	−1.3 (29.7)	7.7 (45.8)
Record low °C (°F)	−26.9 (−16.4)	−28.0 (−18.4)	−20.6 (−5.1)	−13.4 (7.9)	−3.0 (26.6)	−0.7 (30.7)	2.4 (36.3)	2.8 (37.0)	−2.4 (27.7)	−6.3 (20.7)	−18.2 (−0.8)	−24.8 (−12.6)	−28.0 (−18.4)
Average precipitation mm (inches)	21.5 (0.85)	24.7 (0.97)	44.1 (1.74)	77.7 (3.06)	101.5 (4.00)	107.3 (4.22)	71.3 (2.81)	52.4 (2.06)	48.3 (1.90)	44.6 (1.76)	29.7 (1.17)	19.0 (0.75)	642.1 (25.29)
Average precipitation days (≥ 1 mm)	4.4	4.8	7.8	10.6	15.4	13.2	9.4	8	7.5	7.5	4.9	3.7	97.2
Average relative humidity (%)	72.8	71.7	71	74	77.4	78.6	77.8	75	77.3	77.7	75.2	73.1	75.1
Mean monthly sunshine hours	133	141.4	154.8	150.9	180.5	206.7	188.5	191.7	178.2	154.9	137.6	122	1,940.2

== Demographics ==
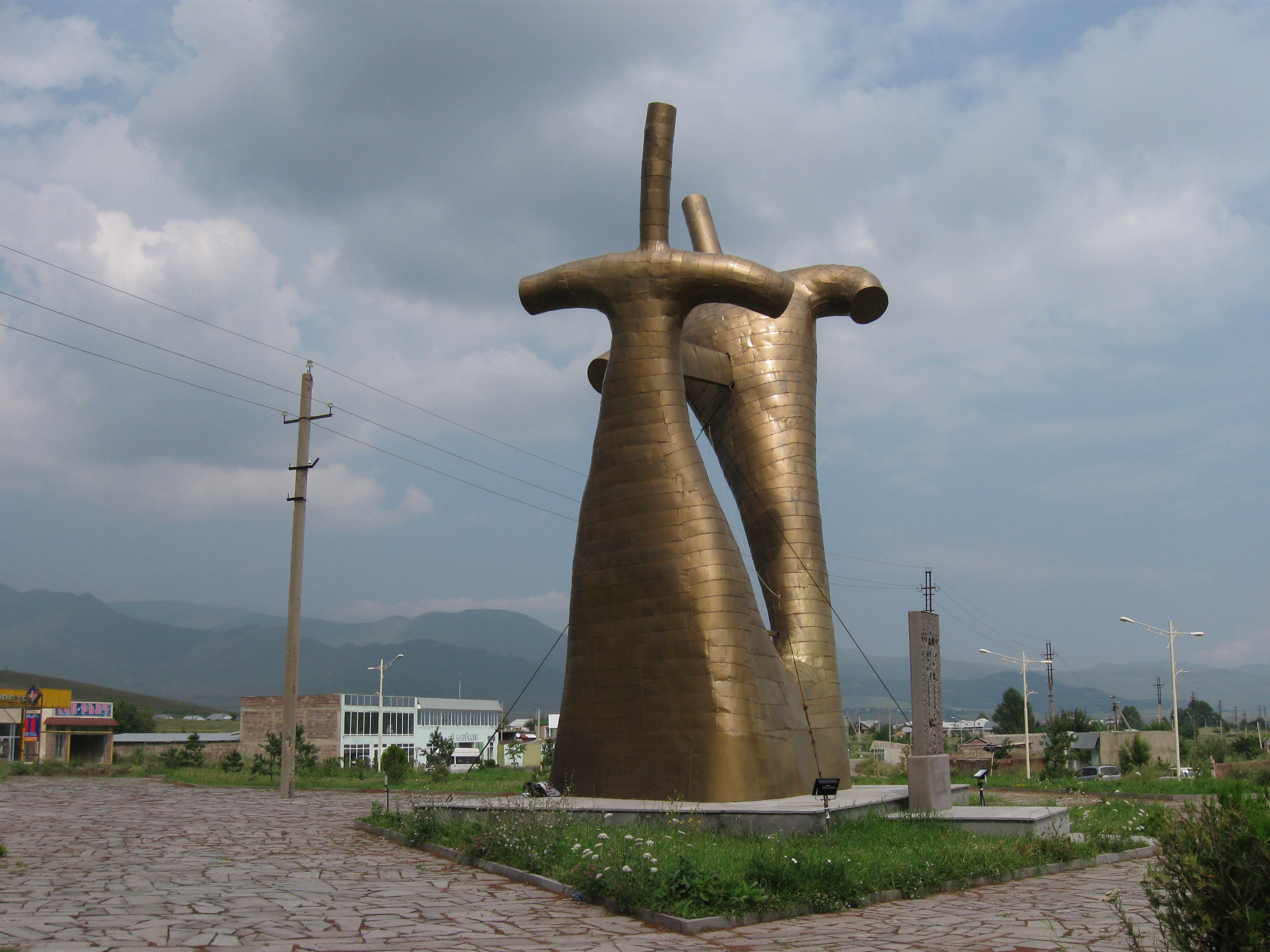
A monument at the centre of Stepanavan

The majority of Stepanavan's inhabitants are ethnic Armenians who belong to the Armenian Apostolic Church. The Surp Sarkis church dating back to the 19th century is the central church of the town. Recently, the Armenian Evangelical community has opened its church at the centre of the town.

However, the town is also home to small communities of Orthodox Russians, Ukrainians and Pontic Greeks. The nearby villages of Yaghdan and Koghes used to have significant Greek communities as well.

Historical population
Year	Pop.	±% p.a.
1831	148	—
1897	3,324	+4.83%
1926	4,973	+1.40%
1939	6,057	+1.53%
1959	9,714	+2.39%
1975	14,764	+2.65%
1989	14,273	−0.24%
2001	16,299	+1.11%
2011	13,086	−2.17%
2022	11,982	−0.80%

== Culture ==
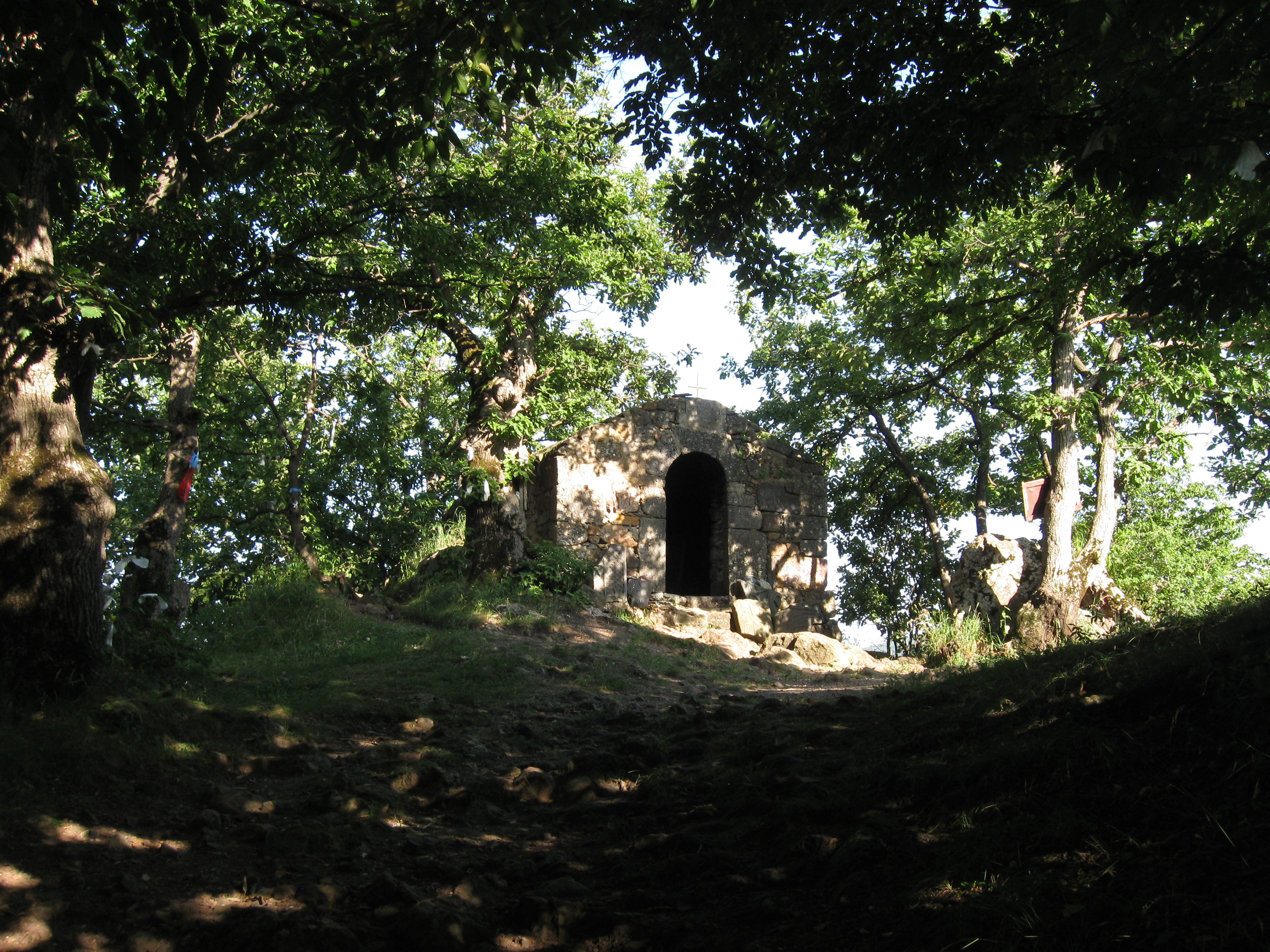
Surp Nshan chapel

The central square of the town is home to the town hall, the cultural palace and the Stepan Shaumian museum. The town is also served by a public library and a medical centre.

=== Heritage ===
- The remains of Tormak Church from the 5-6 centuries in the nearby village of Gyulagarak.
- Lori Fortress of the 11th century. It was the centre of the Kingdom of Tashir-Dzoraget.
- Lori Berd bridge of the 11th century on Miskhana river.
- The Holy Saviour's chapel of the 13th century.
- Surp Nshan chapel of 1871, overlooking the town from an adjacent hill.
- The Russian Saint Nikolai church in the nearby village of Amrakits.

== Transportation ==
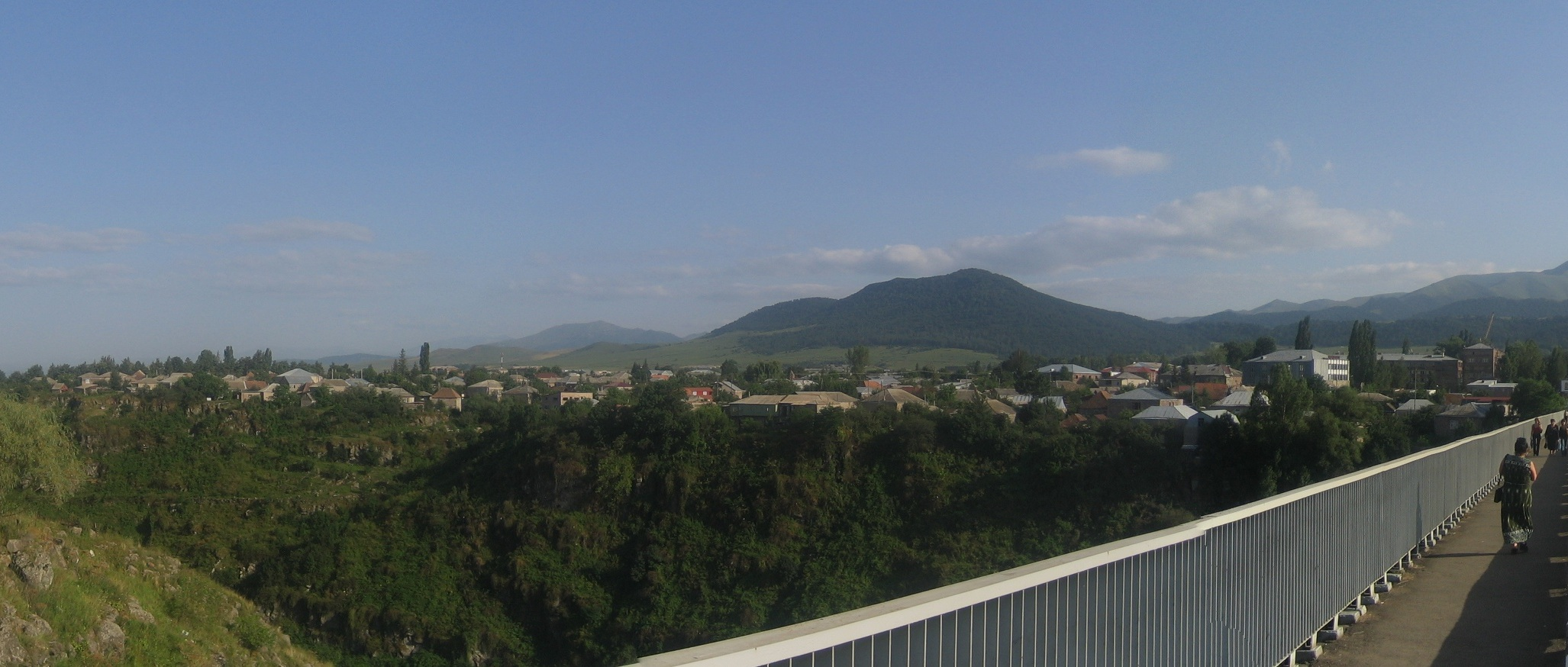
Stepanavan skyline as seen from the Dzoraget bridge

The Stepanavan Airport opened in 1982 is located 8 km (5 mi) northwest of the town, near the village of Getavan. However, it is currently defunct and the government is planning to reopen the airport during 2018.

The M-3 Motorway connects Stepanavan with Yerevan and Vanadzor. The town is connected with other municipalities in Lori viа the H-34 Road from the north, H-33 Road from the east and H-23 Road from the west.

== Economy and tourism ==
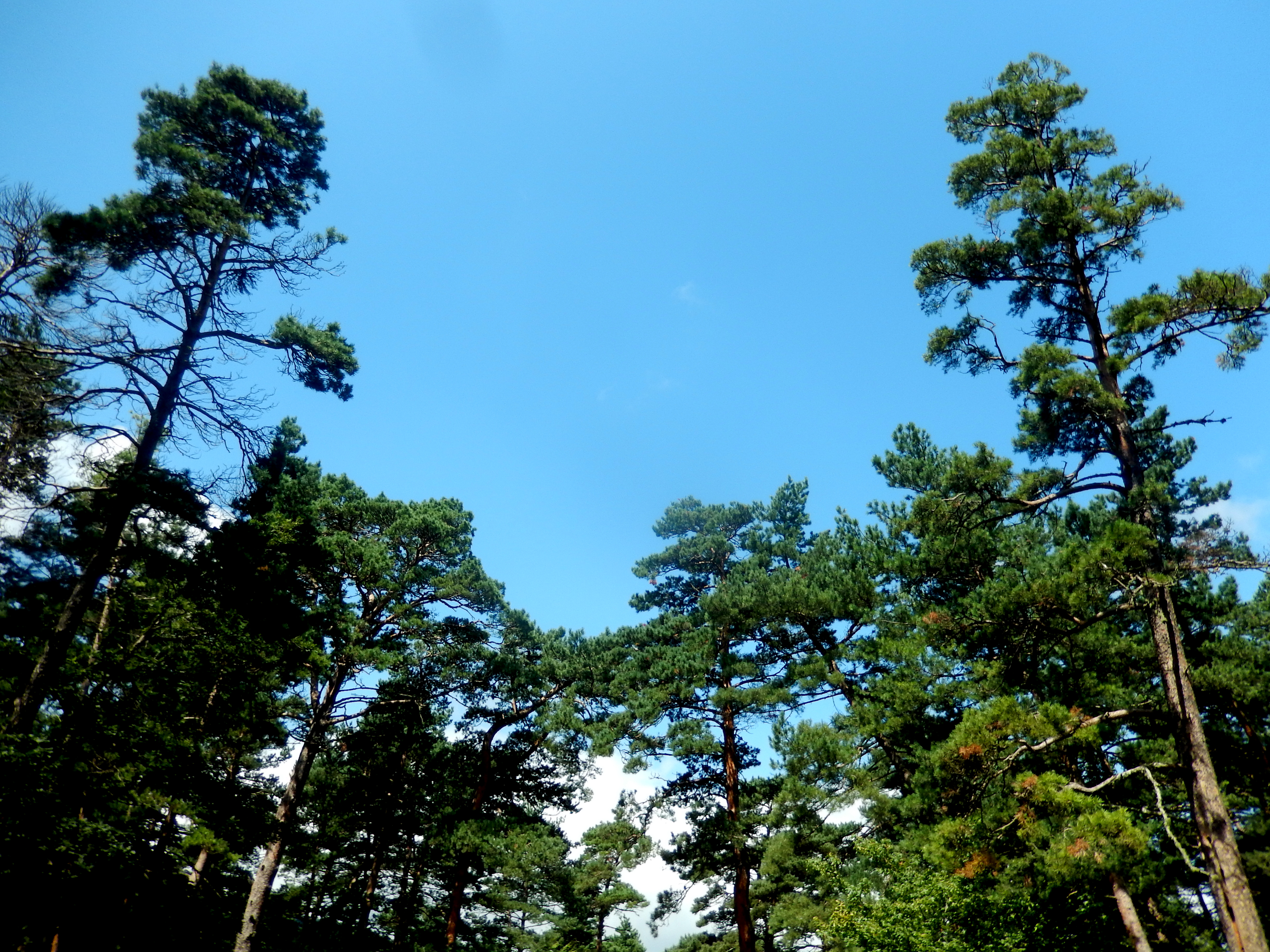
Stepanavan Dendropark

The light industry of the town is mainly based on food-processing and dairy products.

Stepanavan was one of Armenia's most famous tourist spots during the Soviet era, but it had suffered major destruction during the Spitak earthquake of 1988. Nowadays, the city is reviving and tourists from all over the world visit Stepanavan to enjoy the beauty of one of Armenia's most picturesque towns. Nowadays, Stepanavan has many restaurants, hotels and sanatoriums that attract both local and foreign visitors.

=== Attractions ===
- Dzoraget Canyon, a popular recreational destination.
- Lake Kyubishev near Stepanavan, hidden in the heart of Lori's alpine meadows. The lake is covered with lilies and bulrushes.
- Stepanavan Dendropark, founded in 1931 by "Edmon Leonovich", this 35-hectare (86-acre) botanical garden features a broad range of tree species from many regions. It is only 12 km (7 mi) west of Stepanavan, just outside the village of Gyulagarak. The park is known for its pine trees in "Sochut" area.

== Education ==
The first school in Stepanavan was opened in 1869. Currently, there are 6 public education schools and 4 kindergartens in Stepanavan.

The Stepanavan branch of the Crisis Management State Academy is operating since 2006, under the supervision of the Ministry of Emergency Situations of Armenia.

== Sport ==
Football (soccer) is the most popular sport in Stepanavan. However, other types of sports including martial arts, winter sports and handball are also popular in the town.

Stepanavan was chosen as the youth and sport capital of 2015 in Armenia.

== Notable people ==
- Avetik Sahakyan (1863–1933), politician, the first Parliament chairman of the First Republic of Armenia
- Sos Sargsyan (1929-2013), prominent actor, People's Artist of the Soviet Union
- Patvakan Barkhudaryan (1898-1948), was an Armenian film director and a People's Artist of the Armenian SSR (1940).

== Twin towns – sister cities ==
Stepanavan is twinned with:

- Décines-Charpieu, France, since 1992.
- Braslaw, Belarus, since 5 October 2012.
