= Beast (video game) =

1984 video game

- Platform: MS-DOS
- Release: NA: 1984
- Genre: Action

Beast is a text-based action game developed for MS-DOS by Dan Baker, Alan Brown, Mark Hamilton, and Derrick Shadel. It was distributed as shareware in 1984.

== Gameplay ==
Gameplay

The object is to survive through a number of levels while crushing "beasts" (represented by the character ├┤) with movable blocks. The H's are attracted to the player's position, represented by a "diamond-like" character ◄►, every move. The player can control the diamond-shaped character by using the arrow keys or the numeric keypad to move around and/or push blocks. While the normal green block is movable, the yellow static block cannot be pushed or pulled. In the advanced levels, static blocks also become "explosive", which means that the player will lose a life by moving into one. The beginning levels have only common beasts ("├┤"), but more challenging "super-beasts", represented by "╟╢", appear as the player advances through levels. "Super-beasts" are harder to kill as they must be crushed against a static block. At even more advanced levels eggs appear that eventually hatch into "hatched beasts" (╬╬) with the ability to move blocks to crush the player. A two-player mode is also available in which the second player controls a character using WASD keys.

== Reception ==
A review of Beast in the 1988 book Public-domain Software and Shareware noted that the game had "original concepts" but the author admitted that "I don't completely understand this game". In a retrospective review of "classic" ASCII games, PC Magazine described Beast as "so simple yet so replayable" and "stressful at times, but always fun". In his book The Video Game Explosion, scholar Mark Wolf noted that Beast resembled earlier block-pushing games like Sokoban and ASCII text games like Rogue, but advanced beyond both of those games by introducing "freeform, real-time spatial control" into a block-moving action game with "a level of fluidity that is unexpectedly effective".

== See also ==
- Rodent's Revenge
