= Dinosaur Game =

2014 video game

- Developer: Google
- Designers: Sebastien Gabriel; Alan Bettes; Edward Jung
- Platform: Google Chrome
- Release: September 23, 2014
- Genre: Endless running game

The Dinosaur Game (also known as the Chrome Dino) is a 2014 endless runner browser game developed by Google and built into the Google Chrome web browser. In the game, the player guides a pixelated Tyrannosaurus rex across a side-scrolling desert landscape. The game was created by Sebastien Gabriel, Alan Bettes, and Edward Jung. It is installed on the devices of approximately 3.62 billion users of Google Chrome as of March 2026.

== Gameplay ==
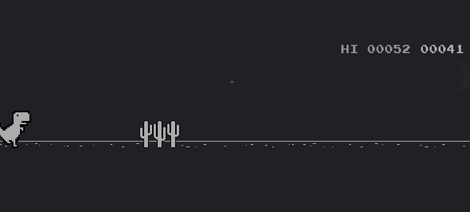
Nighttime graphics in the game

When a user attempts to navigate to a web page on Google Chrome while being offline, the browser notifies the user that they are not connected to the Internet, with an illustration of a pixelated Tyrannosaurus rex shown on the page. The game can then be launched either by pressing space or ↑ on desktop, or by tapping the dinosaur on Android or iOS mobile devices. Additionally, the game can be accessed by inputting chrome://dino or chrome://network-error/-106 into the Omnibox.

During the game, the dinosaur continuously moves from left to right across a black-and-white desert landscape, with the player attempting to avoid oncoming obstacles such as cacti and pterosaurs by jumping or ducking. Pressing space, ↑, or tapping the dinosaur on mobile devices will cause the dinosaur to jump. Pressing the ↓ key will either cause the dinosaur to duck or fall faster depending on if the button is pressed mid-air. As the game progresses, the speed of play gradually increases until the user hits an obstacle, prompting an instant game over.

Once the player reaches a certain point, the game switches from day to night (or vice versa, depending on if dark mode is selected in the browser's settings). The color scheme and accompanying weather graphics then alternate as the game progresses.

If a network administrator disables the Dinosaur Game, an error message appears when attempting to play the game, which features an image of a meteor heading towards the player character.

== Development ==
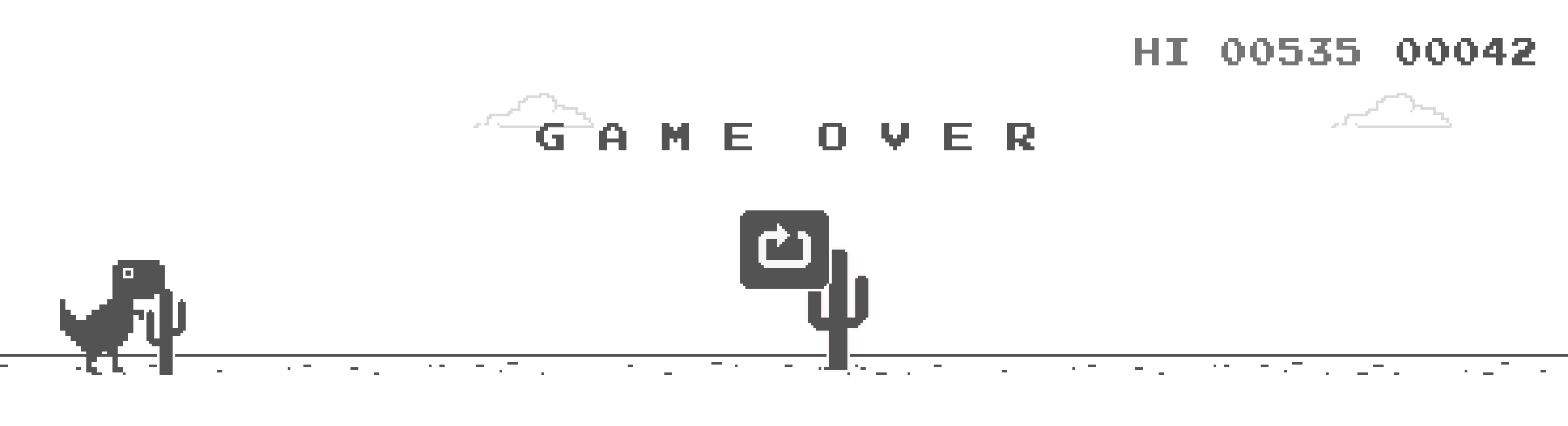
The game over header and restart button after the player runs into a cactus

The game was made by members of the Chrome UX team in 2014, which consisted of Sebastien Gabriel, Alan Bettes, and Edward Jung. Gabriel designed the player character, named the "Lonely T-Rex". During development, the game was given the codename "Project Bolan", in reference to Marc Bolan, the lead singer of the band T. Rex. The developers chose the dinosaur theme as a reference to the game's function, a joke that not having an internet connection is equivalent to living in the "prehistoric ages".

The game was released in September 2014. It initially did not work on older devices, so the code was updated and re-released in December of the same year.

== Updates ==
Pterosaurs were added as obstacles with a browser update in 2015.

In September 2018, an Easter egg was added in celebration of Chrome's 10th birthday and the game's fourth birthday, with a birthday cake appearing in the desert and a birthday hat appearing on the Lonely T-Rex if the cake is "eaten". In November of the same year, Google introduced a feature to save the player's high score. The game's source code is available on the Chromium site.

In July 2020, an Olympic torch Easter egg for the 2020 Tokyo Olympics simulating various Olympic activities was added. Upon reaching the torch, the dino transformed into various Olympic games such as swimming, running, and many others. Instead of the cacti and pterosaur obstacles, the dino encountered challenges related to the Olympics. In 2021, Google introduced a widget in March for iOS 14 that led players to chrome://dino; a similar widget was introduced to Android later that year.

In 2024, Google released GenDino, allowing users to type in a prompt and generate a Dino game with AI-generated sprites. The game was made unavailable later that year.

== Reception and impact ==
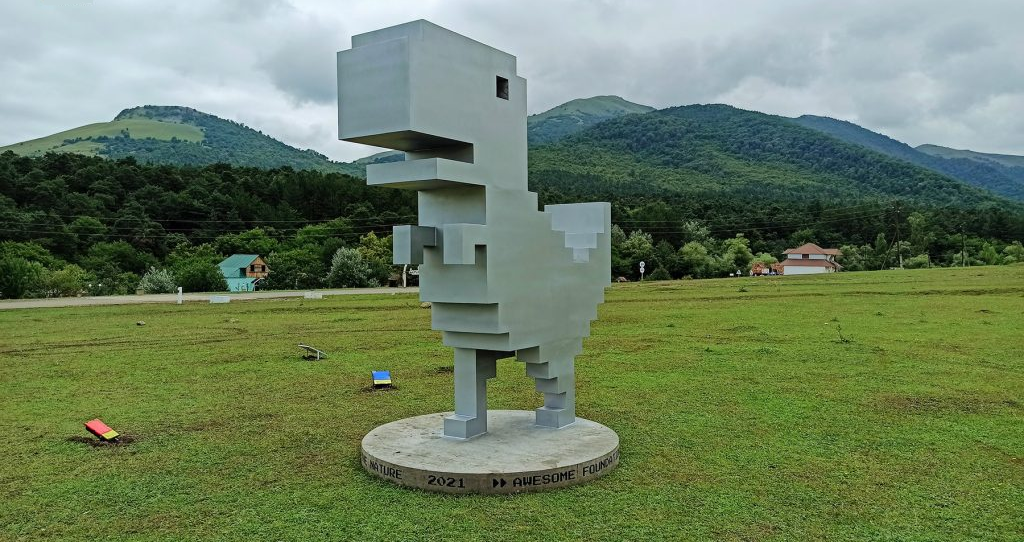
Statue of the Chrome Dino, located in Gyulagarak, Armenia

In 2018, the creators said that approximately 270 million games were played monthly.

The Dinosaur Game is referenced in the "couch gag" opening segment of the season 34 premiere of The Simpsons, "Habeas Tortoise".

In August 2020, MSCHF and 100 Thieves partnered to create a modified version titled Dino Swords, which featured a small arsenal of weapons and time-slowing pills. When mismanaged, the weapons could backfire and harm the dinosaur.

There is a statue of the player dinosaur in Gyulagarak, Armenia.

== See also ==
- List of Google Easter eggs
- Surf, a browser game included with Microsoft Edge
