= Gyulagarak =

Gyulagarak Գյուլագարակ
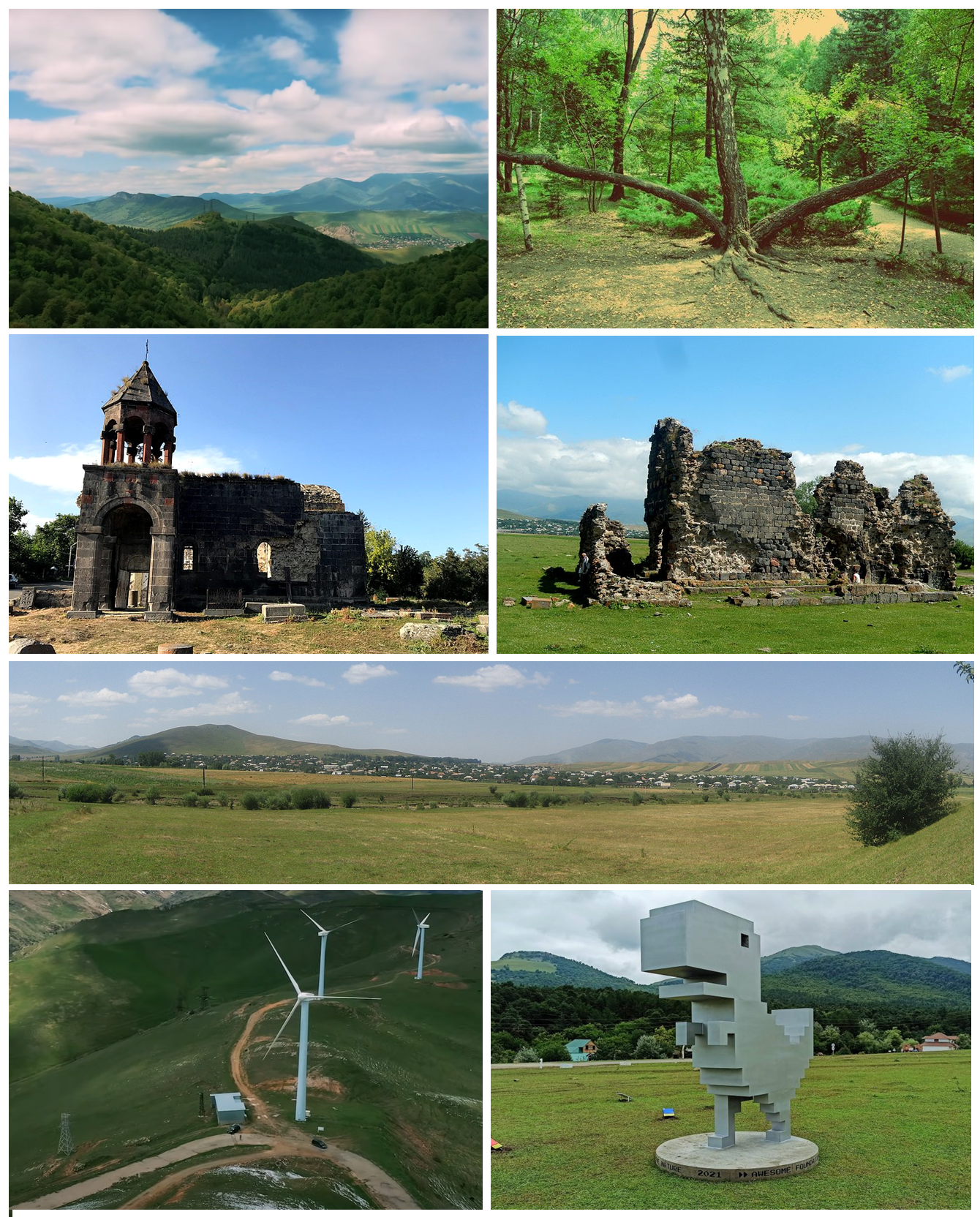

- Location within Armenia
- Coordinates: 40°57′55.86″N 44°28′12.80″E
- Country: Armenia
- Province: Lori
- Elevation: 1,360 m (4,460 ft)

Population (2011)
  - Total: 1,870
- Time zone: UTC+4 (AMT)

Gyulagarak (Armenian: Գյուլագարակ) is a village in the Lori Province of Armenia. Stepanavan Dendropark is located near the village. The village is known for its Chrome Dino statue.

== Toponymy ==
The village was formerly known as Gyulabarak.

== Gallery ==
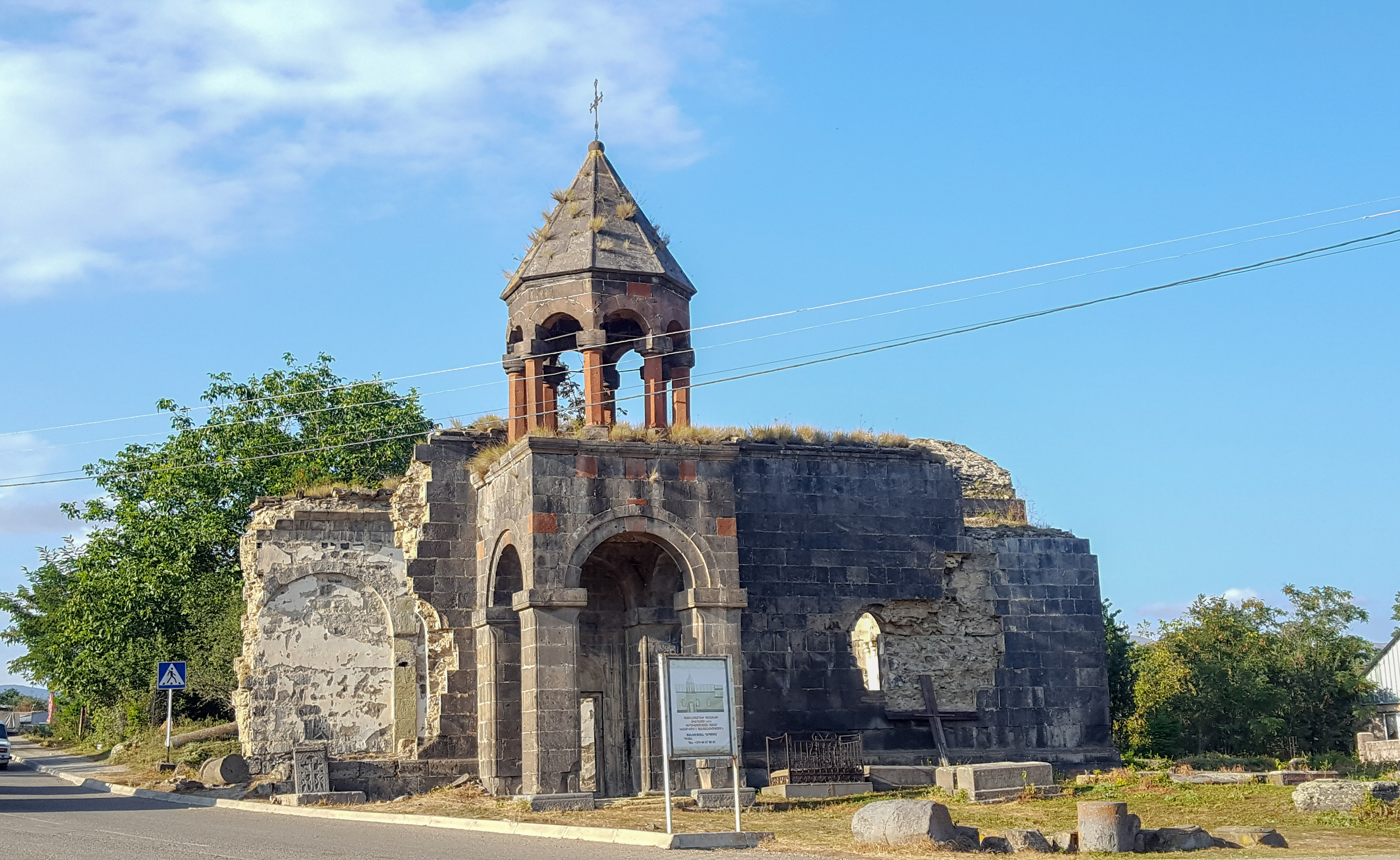
Gyulagarak Church

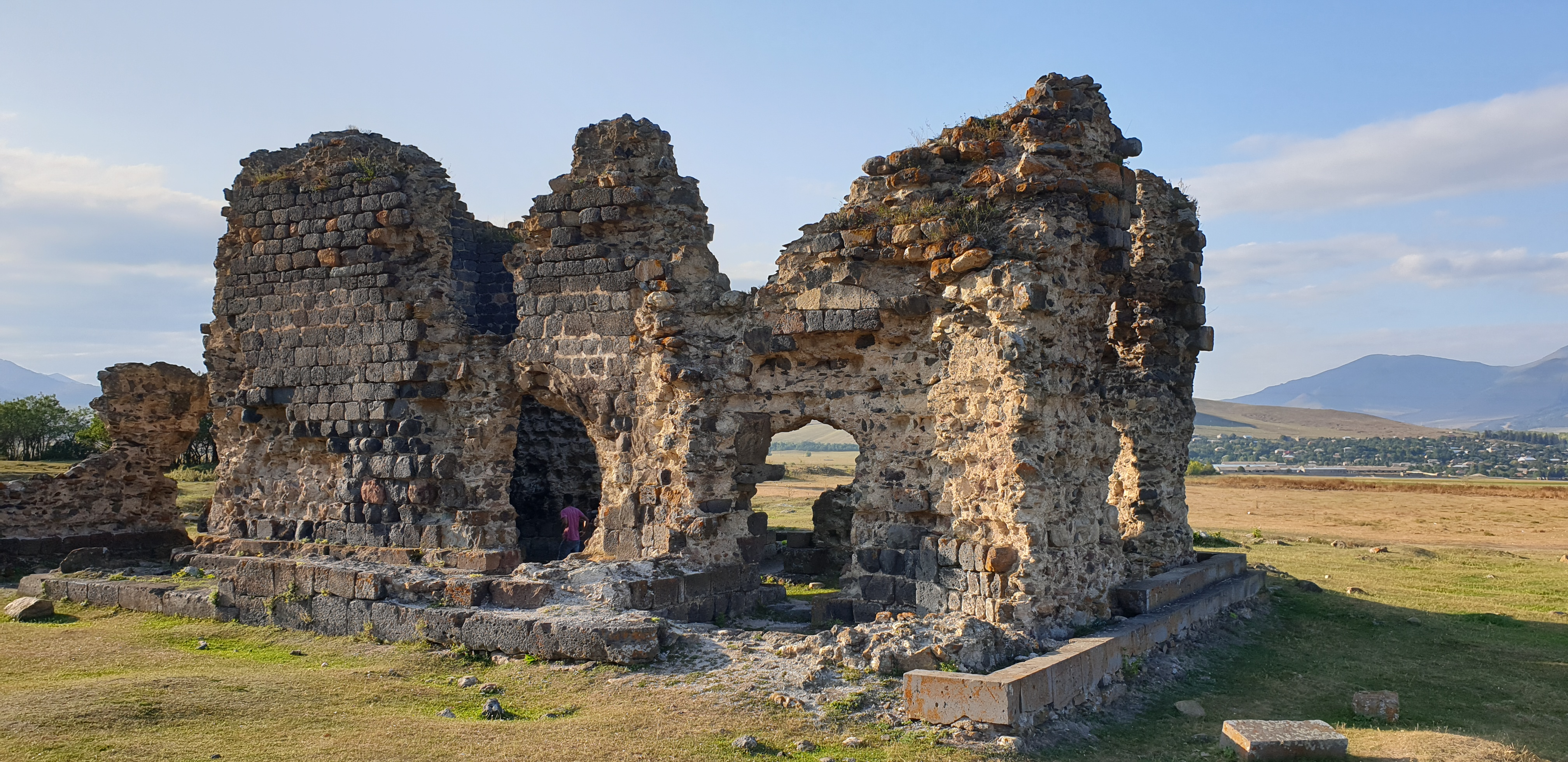
Tormak Church

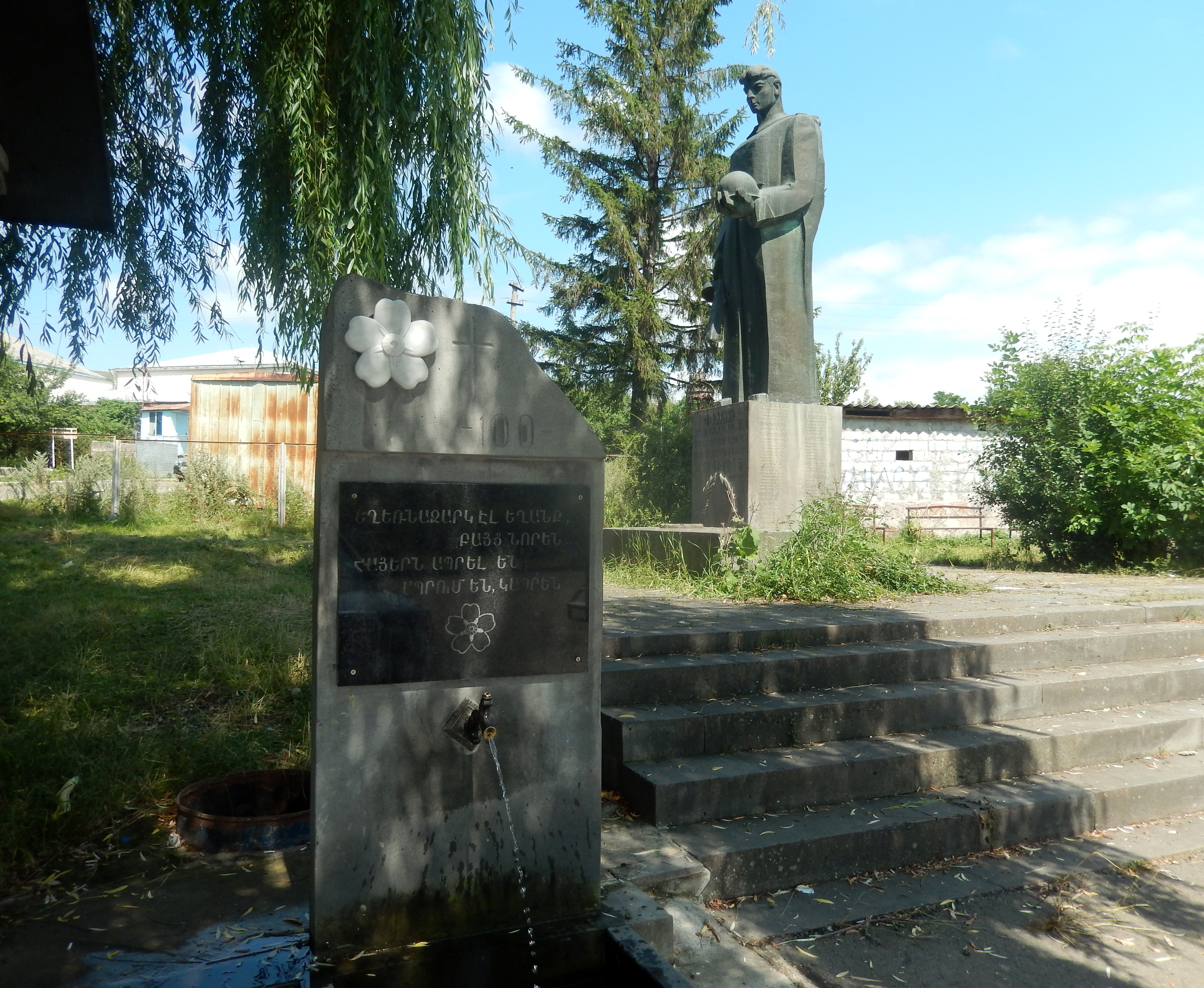
WWII Memorial

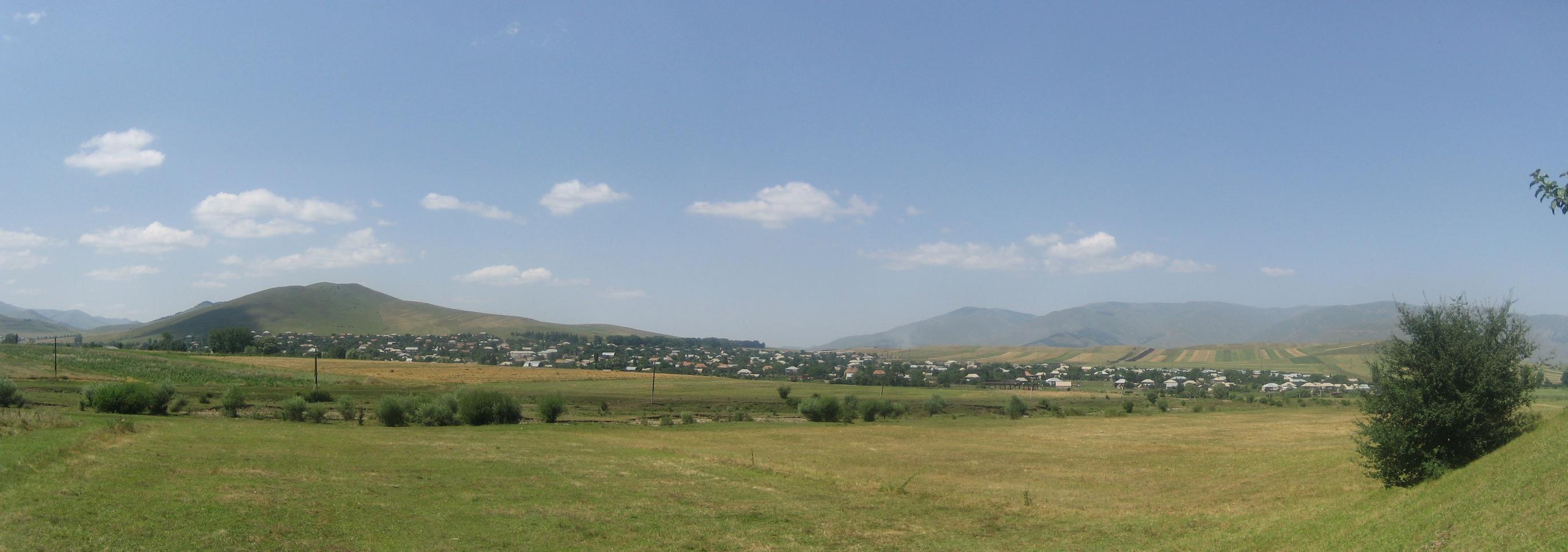
Panorama of Gyulagarak from near Hobardzi

== Notable people ==
- Hrant Shahinyan, two-time Olympic and World champion in gymnastics
