= Getavan, Armenia =

Getavan Գետավան
- Location within Armenia
- Coordinates: 41°03′N 44°20′E
- Country: Armenia
- Marz (Province): Lori
- Elevation: 1,470 m (4,820 ft)

Population (2011)
  - Total: 80
- Time zone: UTC+4 ( )
  - Summer (DST): UTC+5

Getavan (Armenian: Գետավան) is a village in the Lori Province of Armenia.
