= Stepanavan Dendropark =

Arboretum in Armenia

Sochut Dendropark named after Edmund Leonowicz
- Stepanavan "Sojut" Dendropark
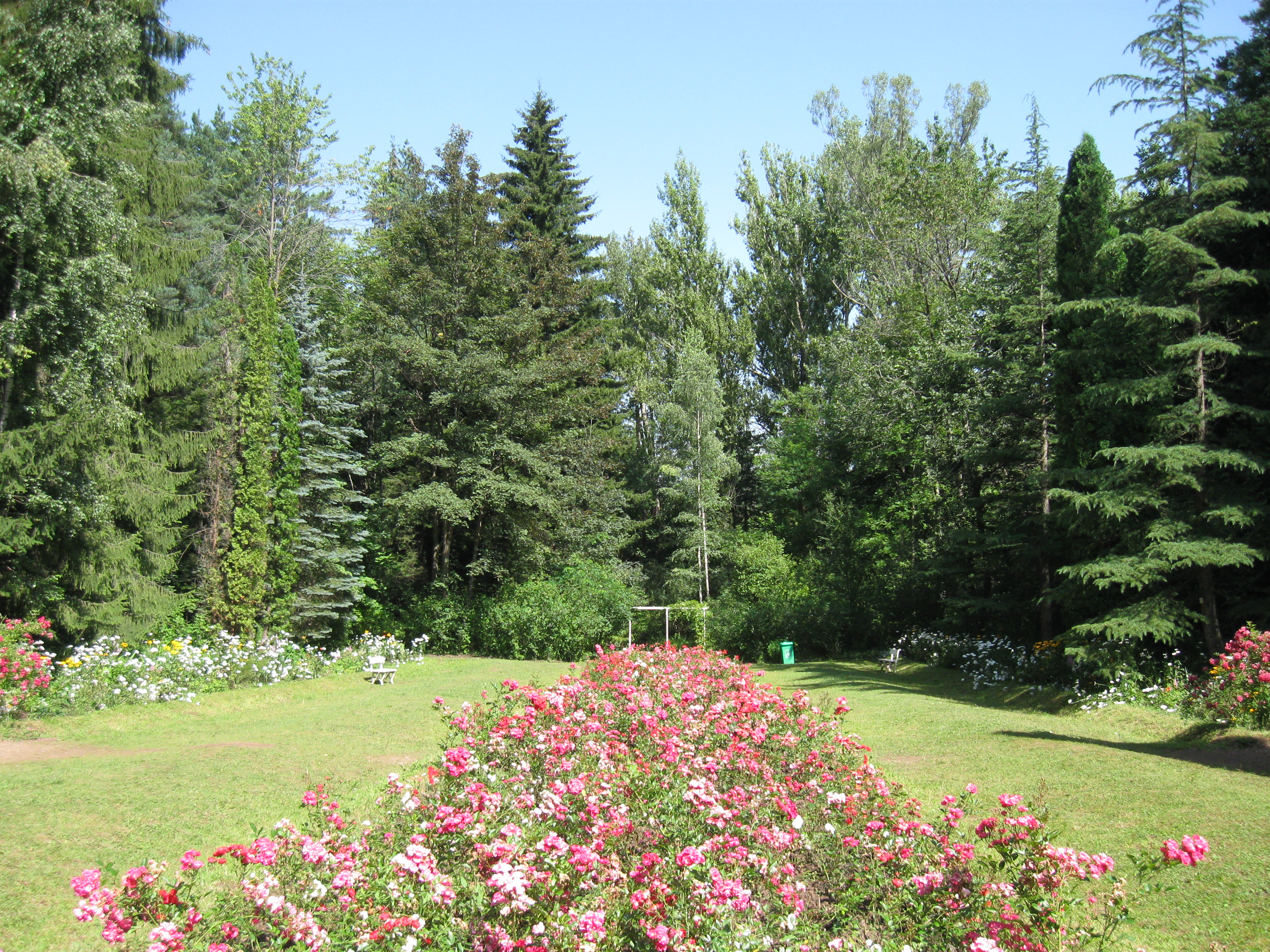
- Trail inside Stepanavan Dendropark

- Location within Armenia
- Nearest city: Stepanavan, Armenia
- Coordinates: 40°56′14.73″N 44°28′48.20″E
- Area: 35 ha (86 acres)
- Established: 1931

Officially Sochut Dendropark named after Edmund Leonowicz, commonly knowns as Stepanavan Dendropark (Armenian: Ստեփանավանի դենդրոպարկ), is an arboretum located near the Gyulagarak village, Lori Province, Armenia. Located around 85 km (53 mi) north of the capital Yerevan, the park was founded in 1931 by Polish engineer-forester Edmund Leonowicz. The arboretum is 35 ha in total of which 17.5 ha consist of natural forest and 15 ha of ornamental trees.

== History ==
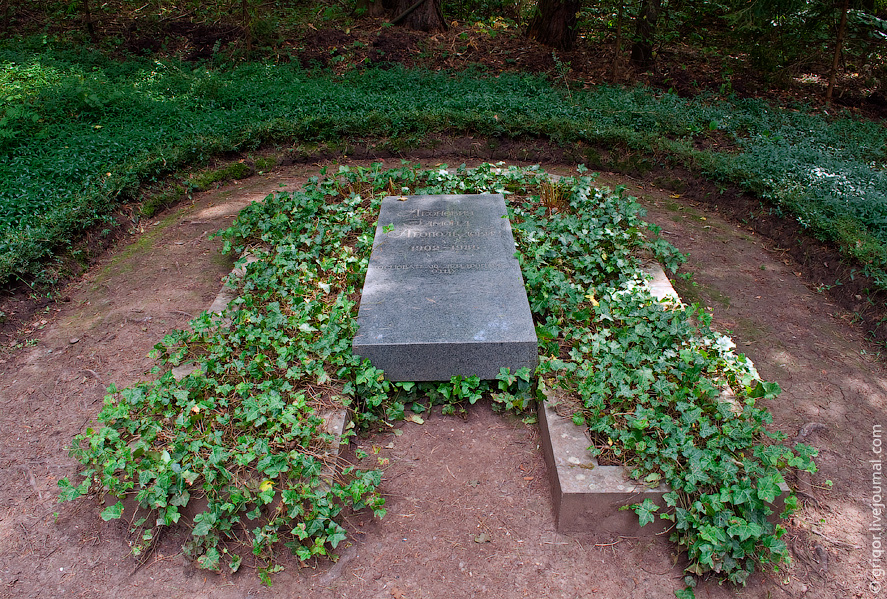
Edmund Leonowicz (1902—1986) grave at Stepanavan Dendropark

This collection expanded along the newly constructed footpaths and vistas which began to reach into the natural forest and is thought to be the first place in the Transcaucasus, where a natural forest landscape had been reshaped into a Forest Park. Most specimens were acquired from other botanic gardens as part of international exchange programmes with the Botanic Garden in Tbilisi (Georgia), Kyiv (Ukraine), Nikitski, (Crimea, Ukraine), Leningrad and Moscow Central (Soviet Union) as well as the Far East. Specimens were also obtained further afield from Germany, France, Portugal, China and the United States. There are now more than 500 introduced species.

== Collection ==
The Stepanavan Dendropark consists of deciduous forest and ornamental plantings with avenues of Lime (Tilia cordata), and wild-sourced specimens of Juglans, Malus, Populus and Pyrus. The arboretum is home to a wide variety of trees, including Magnolia species, Larix decidua, Cypresses of various genera, Pinus sibirica, Cryptomeria japonica and Sequoiadendron giganteum. Among the native species are Carpinus caucasica, the Limes Tilia dasystyla and T. cordata, Fagus orientalis, the Elms Ulmus elliptica, Ulmus scabra and Ulmus foliacea, the Oaks Quercus macranthera, Quercus iberica and Quercus longipes, Pinus sylvestris var. hamata and Pyrus communis (note: Armenia is an important centre of pear diversity with over 20 known species).

During the operation of the arboretum, it tested the suitability for local conditions of about 2,500 taxa. Of this number of taxa introduced, around 500 species have survived and are growing in the garden.

Seeds from the arboretum are spread throughout the world through Index Seminum published by Yerevan Botanical Garden. Mainly from the garden in Yerevan, there are also plants planted in the arboretum, imported from various regions of the former Soviet Union, but also China, Western Europe and North America.

== Gallery ==
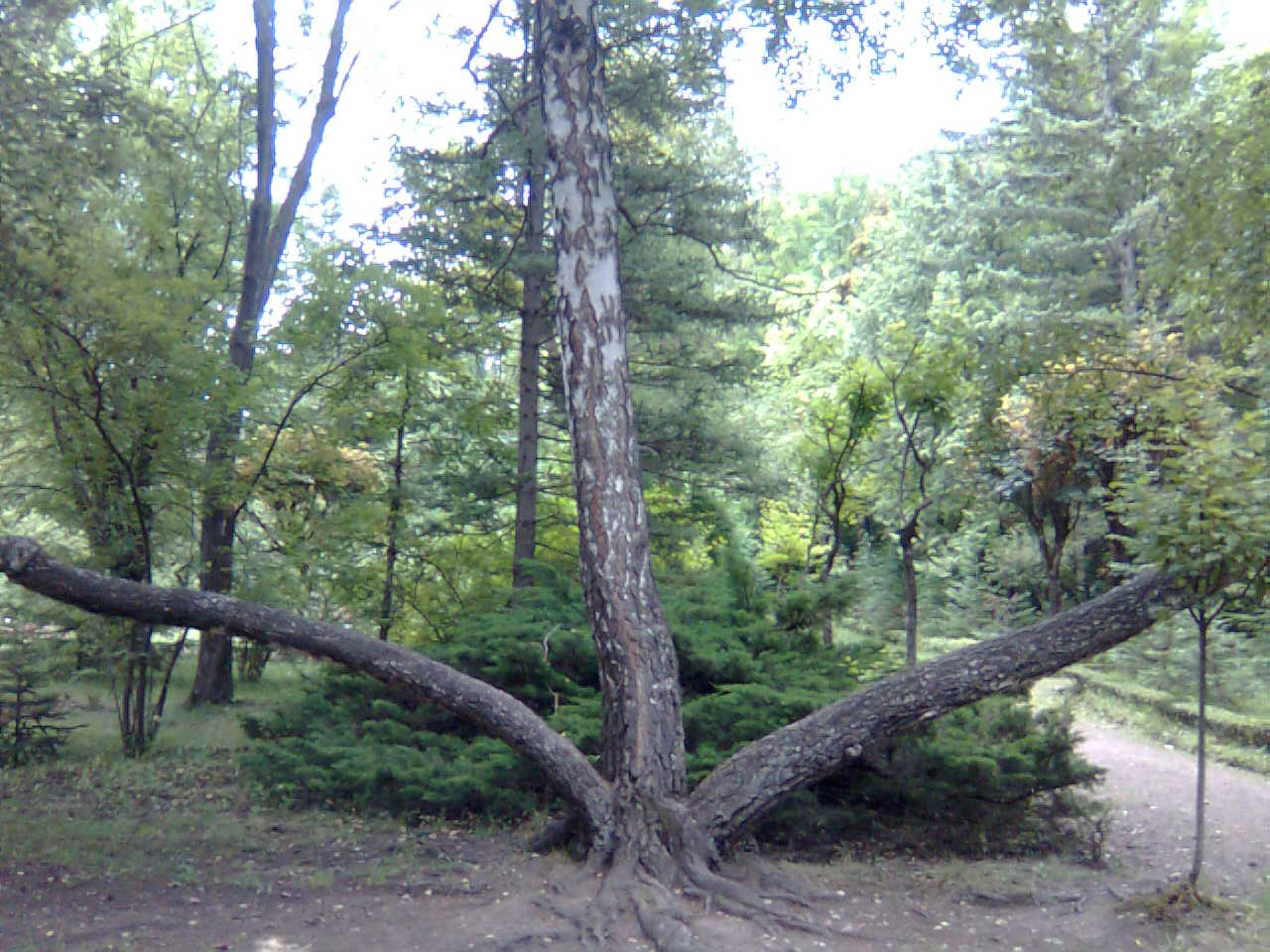
Inside Dendropark

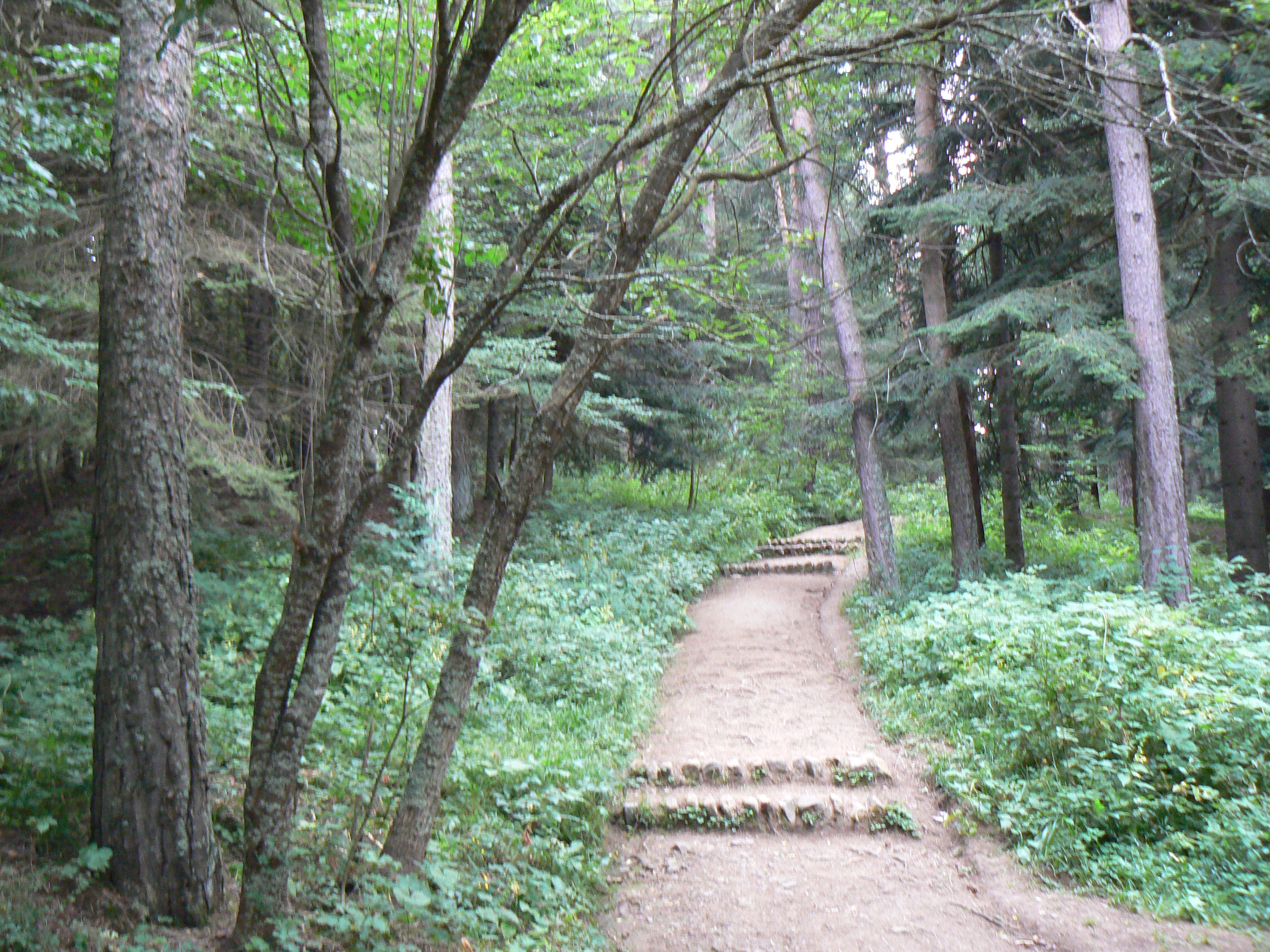
Alley in Dendropark

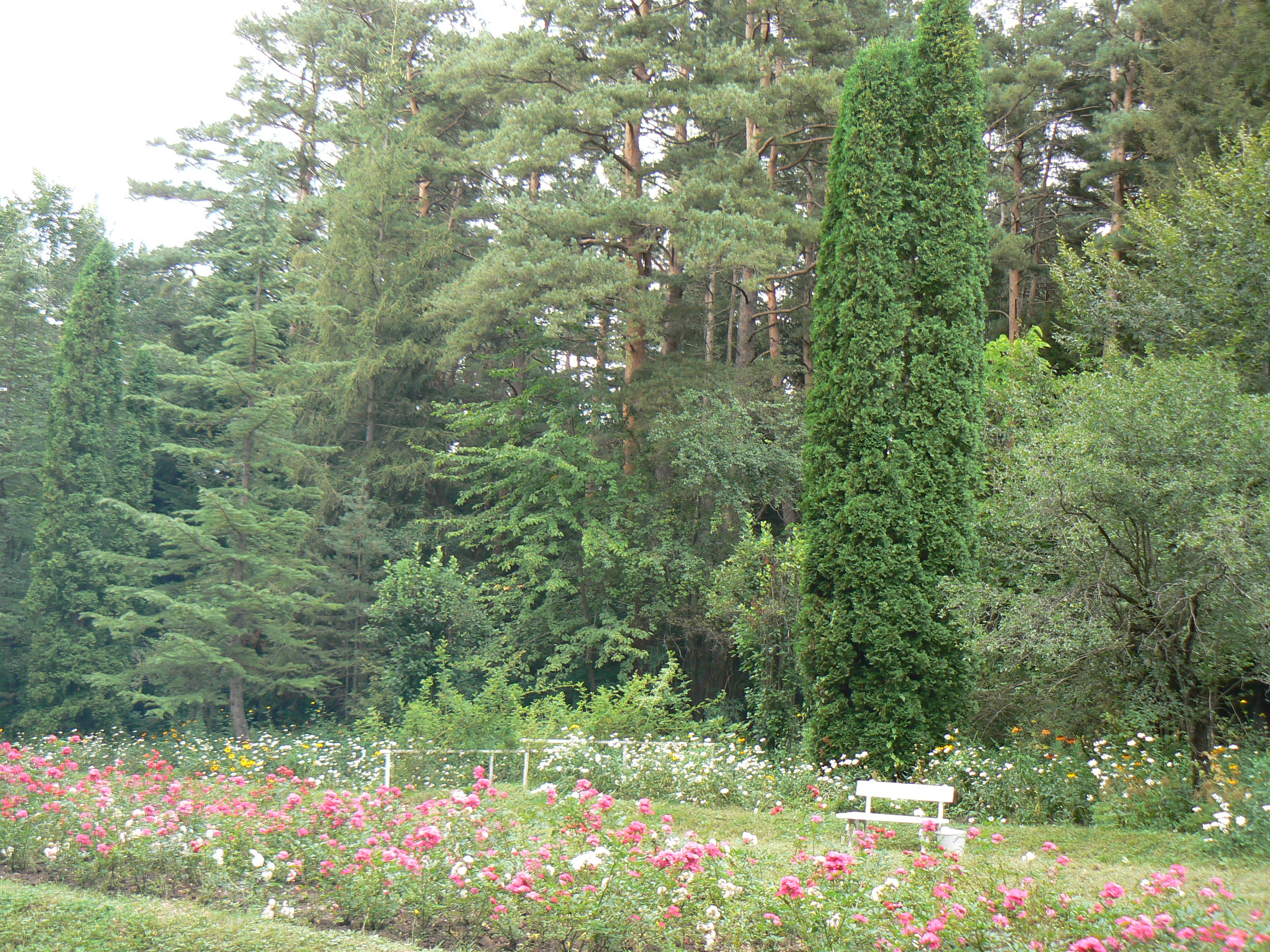
Inside Dendropark

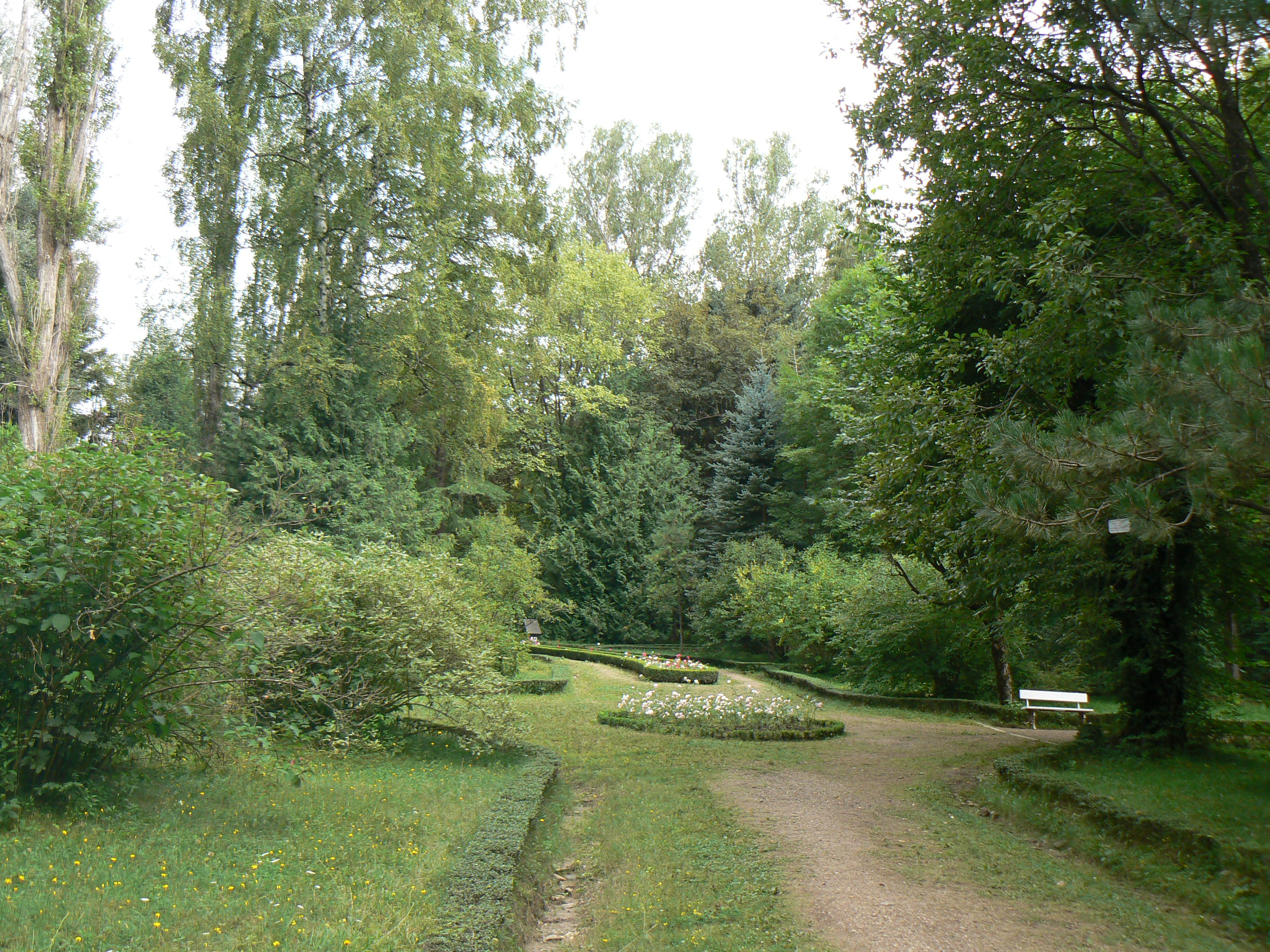
Alley in Dendropark

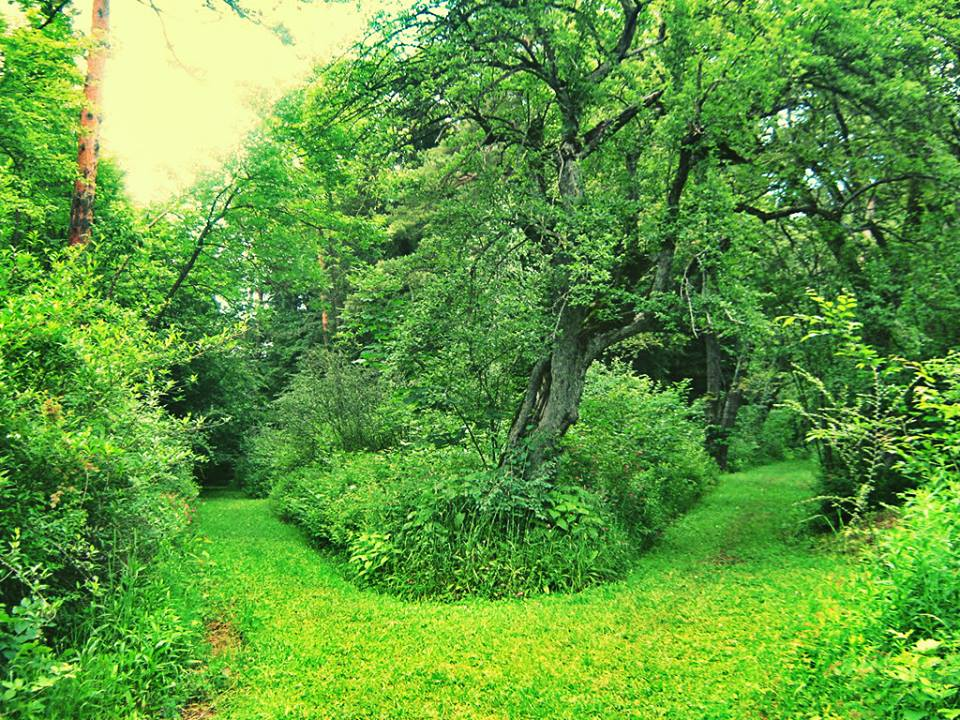
View from the dendropark

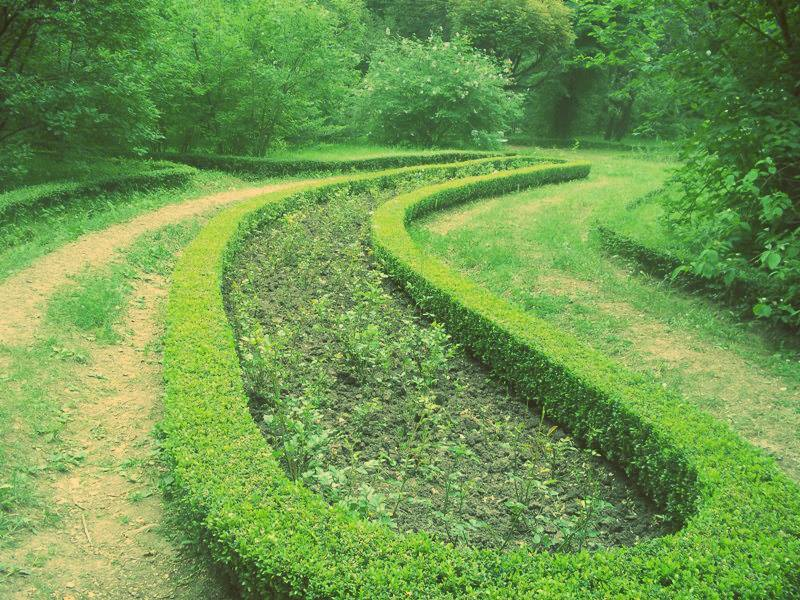
View from the dendropark

== Tourist attraction ==
Nowadays the arboretum is of interest to the general public, professional scientists and eco-tourists. It provides the opportunity to study adaptive characteristics of different plants to the new environmental conditions, conduct training programmes for student internships and study the distinctive flora of the Transcaucasus region.

Admission is free and open to the public.

== See also ==
- Yerevan Botanical Garden
