= Pyramide (patience) =

Die Pyramide is a patience game of medium difficulty that is played with 104 playing cards. It is also known as Big Harp. It has one more stack than Double Klondike, which makes the game easier. The name is German and means "The Pyramid". It is not related to the patience game of Pyramid.

== Rules ==
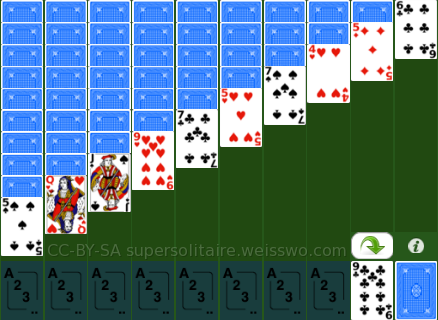
Figure 1: Pyramide: setup

Use two decks of cards. Shuffle them and deal 9, 8, 7, 6, 5, 4, 3, 2, 1 and 0 hidden cards on the 10 cascades. Now add one row of open cards and you are ready to go.

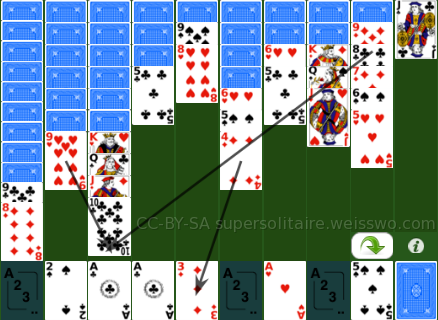
Figure 2: Pyramide - game in progress

Try to build ascending from the aces on the 8 foundations and use the Klondike red on black alternating-colour rule to build cascades. If stuck, draw card by card from the stock to the waste. The game allows you to recycle the waste stack exactly one time. Empty cascades can accept any card (easy variation) or only Kings (harder variation).

== See also ==
- Double Klondike
- List of solitaires
- Glossary of solitaire
