= Interregnum (disambiguation) =

An interregnum is a period of discontinuity in a government, organization, or social order.

Interregnum may also refer to:

- Interregnum, a period in the history of England, Ireland, and Scotland
  - Interregnum (England)
  - Interregnum (Ireland)
  - Interregnum (Scotland)
- Interregnum (Holy Roman Empire), periods in the history of the Holy Roman Emperor when there was no emperor
- Ottoman Interregnum, civil war in which the sons of Sultan Bayezid I fought for control of the empire.
- Interregnum (Transjordan) (1920–1921)
- Interregnum (History of the Maldives)
- Interregnum of World Chess Champions (1946–1948)
- Interregnum (solitaire), a card game
- George Grosz' Interregnum, a 1960 documentary short film

== See also ==
- Interregnum regent
