= Sly Fox (disambiguation) =

Sly Fox is a comedic play by Larry Gelbart, based on Ben Jonson's Volpone.

Sly Fox may also refer to:

- Sly Fox (band), an American dance pop duo
- Sly Fox (horse), an American Thoroughbred racehorse
- Sly Fox (solitaire), a solitaire card game played with two decks of 52 playing cards each
- Sly Fox (song), a song by American rapper Nas from his untitled ninth album
- Sly Fox Brewery, a Pennsylvania brewery
