= Carpet (card game) =

Patience or card solitaire game

- A Patience game
- Family: Carpet-like
- Deck: Single 52-card

The Carpet is a patience or solitaire game where the object is to discard all cards to the foundations where the aces are already dealt. It is a simple game relatively easy to get out more often than not.

== Rules ==
The game starts with the aces separated from the pack to form the foundations. After the remaining 48 cards are shuffled, 20 cards are laid out on the tableau in a 5x4 grid fashion to form "the carpet". The remaining 28 cards make up the stock or talon.

All cards from "the carpet" must be moved to the foundations up by suit (i.e. 2♠ over A♠). Any "holes on the carpet", i.e. spaces left behind by the cards that are moved to the foundations, are filled by cards from the waste pile or, if the waste pile is empty, the talon.

The talon cards are dealt one at the time on the waste pile and can be moved to the foundations or to the carpet if necessary. Once the talon is used up, all cards on the waste pile cannot be used as a new talon. Only the top card of the waste pile is available to be played.Similar mechanics and concepts can be found in other solitaire games such as Klondike, where tableau management and strategic card movement play a vital role.[3]

The game is out when all of the cards are moved into the foundations.

== Strategy ==
Good strategy aims to fill empty spaces with cards that can soon be played, if possible building up in the carpet chains of cards that can be played consecutively, while leaving higher & lower ranking Cards in the discard pile until later in the game.

== Variations ==
Under some rules (e.g. Basil Dalton's The Complete Patience Book), the Aces remain in the pack at the start of the game and only are played to the foundations when they are appear during regular play.

Colorado and Twenty (sometimes called Sly Fox) are among several games that work similar to Carpet, but use two packs.

Four Winds is a lesser known game in the style of Carpet, and has a set-up consisting of 16 tableau piles in the shape of the four directions of a compass.

== See also ==
- Colorado
- List of patiences and card solitaires
- Glossary of patience and card solitaire terms
