= Sultan of Turkey =

Sultan of Turkey may refer to:

- List of sultans of the Ottoman Empire
- Sultan of Turkey (card game), a patience or card solitaire
