= Algerian =

Algerian may refer to:

- Something of, or related to Algeria
- Algerians, a person or people from Algeria, or of Algerian descent
- Algerian Arabic, the variety of Arabic spoken in Algeria
- Algerian cuisine
- Algerian culture
- Algerian Islamic reference, framework for practising Islam in Algeria
- Algerian Mus'haf, an Algerian Quranic manuscript
- Algerian (solitaire), a card game
- Algerian (typeface), i.e. a font

== See also ==
- Languages of Algeria
- List of Algerians
