= Stalactite (disambiguation) =

Stalactite or stalactites may refer to:

- Stalactite, a mineral formation that hangs from the ceiling of caves
- Stalactite work, another name for muqarna vaulting technique
- Stalactites (solitaire), a card game
- Stalactites (restaurant), a restaurant in Melbourne, Australia
