= Precedence =

Precedence may refer to:

- Message precedence of military communications traffic
- Order of precedence, the ceremonial hierarchy within a nation or state
- Precedence (mathematics) for defining the order of operations in a computation
- Precedence Entertainment, a defunct American game publisher
- Precedence (solitaire), a solitaire card game which uses two decks of playing cards
- Precedence, a brand of SPECT/CT scanner manufactured by Philips

== See also ==
- Precedent, a legal case establishing a principle to be adhered to in subsequent rulings
