= Archway (card game) =

Solitaire card game

Archway is a patience or solitaire card game of the open builder type that uses two packs of 52 playing cards. Its goal is to bring all 104 cards into the foundation. It was invented by David Parlett, and is based on an old French solitaire game called La Chatelaine (Lady of the Manor).

== Description ==
=== Layout ===
The game starts by placing one of each ace (A♥, A♠, A♦, A♣) and one of each king (K♥, K♠, K♦, K♣) at the bottom of your playing area. These cards will be your foundation. At the middle of the playing area, the tableau is created by randomly dealing 4 columns of 12 cards all face up.

All the remaining cards are placed in one of the 13 reserve piles that are placed like an archway around the tableau. Each of the reserve piles corresponds to the face value of a card; the aces will be the first one on the left side, the kings will be the first one on the right side, and the 7 will be at the top of your archway.

=== Playing ===
The goal is to move cards from the tableau and the reserve piles to the foundation to form 4 piles from ace to king (1 for each suit) and 4 piles of king to ace (1 for each suit). Any reserve card can be moved from the reserve pile to the foundation as long as the card is the next in the foundation suite. Only the top most card of a tableau pile can be moved to a foundation pile. If a tableau pile is empty, any card can be placed at the location of the empty pile.

=== Winning ===
The game is won when all eight foundation piles count 13 cards each, each pile containing only one suite and all cards in order, from aces to kings or from kings to aces. The game is lost when no more moves are possible and the foundations are not completed.

== Variations ==
Archway rarely works out successfully, and the chances of winning have been estimated as having less than 1%. The rules described in The Playing Card Kit make the game slightly easier by allowing cards to be moved from the tableau to the reserve piles.

Archway was based on La Châtelaine (also called Lady of the Manor), which begins with eight aces as foundations, with the goal of building all these up to kings. Unlike Archway, the starting tableau consists of four face-up piles rather than four columns where all the cards are visible. Although it is not an open information game like Archway, Lady of the Manor is considerably easier to win, because building on the foundations happens regardless of suit.

== See also ==
- List of patiences and solitaires
- Glossary of patience and solitaire terms
