= Acme (card game) =

Canfield type of patience or solitaire card game using a single deck of playing cards

- A Patience game
- Origin: England
- Type: Reserved packer
- Deck: Single 52-card

Acme is a patience or card solitaire of the reserved packer type using a single deck of playing cards.

== History ==
Acme is an old patience whose rules are first recorded by "Tarbart" in 1905.

== Rules ==
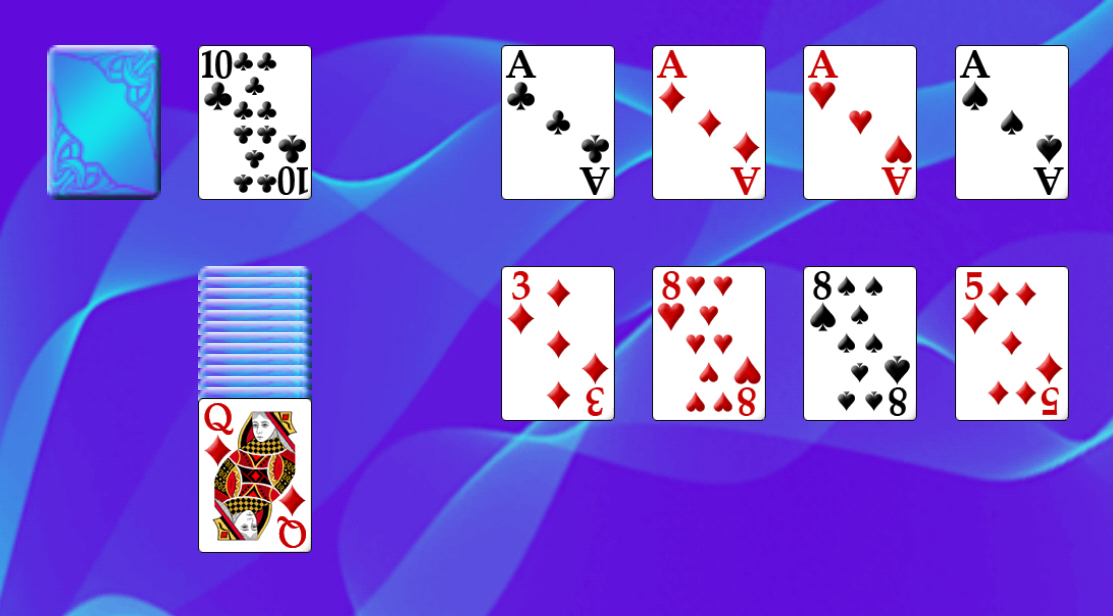
Game layout

Acme has four tableau locations or depots initially of one card each, and they are built down in suit. There are also four foundations that build up in suit. The reserve pile contains 13 cards which can be played onto the foundations or tableau. The player turns up one card at a time from the talon, the cards remaining in their hand.

Only the top card of a depot can be moved. These cards can be moved to a foundation or onto another depot. The tableau builds down in suit, and the foundations build up in suit. Cards from the reserve automatically fill any vacancies in the tableau. Any card can fill a vacancy after the reserve is exhausted. There is only one redeal allowed in this game, so only two passes through the deck are allowed.

Strategy: Rather than using the cards from the deck, a player should try to use all of the reserve cards first. Only two passes are allowed, so the deck should be used wisely.

== Variations ==
In the variation Acme II, the whole of each tableau pile may be moved rather than just the top card.

== Bibliography ==
- "Tarbart" (1905). Games of Patience. 2nd edn. De La Rue.

== See also ==
- Canfield
- List of patiences and solitaires
- Glossary of patience and solitaire terms
