= Elevens =

Card games

Elevens is a patience or card solitaire of the Simple Addition family that uses a standard 52-card deck, with the goal of removing pairs of cards that add to eleven. Odds of winning are slightly better than 1 in 10.

== Rules ==
Cards are placed in a 3x3 grid. Pairs of cards which add up to eleven (5 and 6; 4 and 7; 3 and 8; 2 and 9; Ace and 10) are covered up. Face cards (J, Q, K) may be eliminated in a set of three cards consisting of one Jack, one Queen and one King regardless of suit.

If all cards are covered up the game is won; if there are no more pairs of cards that add up to eleven, and there do not exist a Jack, a Queen, and a King, the game is lost.

== Strategy ==
An individual game of Elevens is a game of pure chance, except for the small element of skill involved in spotting the pairs; the skill and strategic interest comes in not shuffling the cards at the end of each game, but instead collecting them up in order.

== Variations ==
Elevens is very similar to several other solitaire games in the adding and pairing genre, such as Fifteens, Straight Fifteens, Block 10, and Kings in the Corners, all of which use a 4x4 grid, but require players to remove pairs adding to a total other than 11 such as 15 or 10. The solitaire games Tens, Good Thirteen (also called Thirteens), Seventeens, and Eighteens apply a similar concept to other totals.

== See also ==
- List of solitaires
- Glossary of solitaire

== Bibliography ==
- Moyse, Alphonse Jr. (1950). 150 Ways to Play Solitaire. USPCC. 128 pp.
