= Ninety-One (solitaire) =

Solitaire card game

Ninety-One is a solitaire card game which is played using a deck of playing cards. The object of this game is to move cards so the top cards of the piles total to 91, hence the name.

== Rules ==
Thirteen piles of four cards each are dealt. Only one card can be moved at a time and the top cards of the piles are ones that are counted. Cards are even transferred without any regard to suit or value. Spot cards (cards from ace to ten) are taken at their face value, while jacks are valued at 11, queens at 12, and kings at 13.

The game is won when the top cards of the thirteen piles have a total value of 91. The easiest combination to obtain is a sequence of thirteen cards from ace to king ($91=1+2+3+4+5+6+7+8+9+10+11+12+13$). But there are many other combinations that add up to 91, such as four kings, four aces, three fives, and two tens for instance ($91=13*4+1*4+3*5+10*2=52+4+15+20$). It is up to the player how to figure out those combinations.

== See also ==
- List of solitaire games
- Glossary of solitaire terms
