= Tower of Hanoy =

Solitaire card game based on Tower of Hanoi

Tower of Hanoy is a solitaire card game which only uses 9 playing cards. It is based on the actual Tower of Hanoi game, where the object is to transfer discs from one peg to another without disturbing their order. The origin of the spelling is unclear. It has also been given the alternative names Tower of Pisa or The Tower of Pisa.

== Rules ==
The following rules are based on Coops (1939) except where stated:

First, nine cards, from Deuce to 10 (or Ace to 9) are removed from the deck, shuffled and dealt in 3 columns of three cards each, face up. The aim is to rearrange the cards in sequence as one column or 'tower' with the 10 at the top according to the following rules:

- Only one card can be moved at a time
- The card must be moved from the bottom of one column to the bottom of another
- The moved card must be placed under one of higher rank
- When a column has been emptied, the bottom card from one of the two remaining columns may be moved to the top of the vacant column

The game is won when all nine cards arranged vertically in one column from the nine at the bottom to the ace at the top.

== Variations ==
This article explains the game with the cards overlapping to avoid confusion. There are versions of the game where the cards are laid out in a 3×3 grid and the player aims to make a vertical column with the direction of play either upwards or downwards; the rules above can be modified to suit the direction and/or manner of play.

== See also ==
- Tower of Hanoi
- List of patiences and solitaires
- Glossary of patience and solitaire terms

== Bibliography ==
- Coops, Helen Leslie (1939). 100 Games of Solitaire. Whitman.
- Hervey, George F. (1965). Card Games for One: Patiences, Solitaires. Sevenoaks: Hodder & Stoughton.
- Lock, Ward (1994) [1993]. The Complete Book of Card Games. London: Magna. ISBN 1-85422-855-2
