= Duchess of Luynes =

Card game

- A Patience game
- Alternative names: La Duchesse de Luynes, Grand Duchess
- Family: Carpet-like
- Deck: Single 52-card

Duchess of Luynes is a patience or card solitaire game played with two packs of playing cards. It is a member of the Sir Tommy family. A unique feature of this game is the building of the reserve, which is not used until the entire stock runs out.

== Name ==
An English game possibly of French origin it was first called La Duchesse de Luynes or Duchess of Luynes by Lady Adelaide Cadogan (1874). In American sources it is usually known by the name of Grand Duchess (Note: Dick (1883) was the first to coin the name The Grand Duchess. but it is copied by others including Morehead and Mott-Smith (1950).) Jones (1888) also referred to it as One to Six and that name is occasionally copied by later writers. Parisienne is a variant recorded by Parlett.

== Rules ==
First, four cards are dealt face-up, one onto each tableau pile, and two more cards are dealt face-down on the reserve to be used later. After each deal of six cards, the player pauses to see if any cards are playable. Available for play to the foundations (which are above the four tableau piles) are the top cards of each tableau pile.

As they become available, one ace and one king of each suit are placed in the foundations. The aces are built up to kings while the kings are built down to aces, all by suit. Furthermore, once a foundation card is set, any can be built upon it at any time.

Once the player builds the necessary cards one could, another set of six is dealt: one on each of the four tableau piles and two face-down ones set aside on the reserve. Afterwards the player builds more cards and the process is repeated until the stock runs out. Once this occurs, the entire reserve is turned face-up. All cards in that reserve become available to be built on the foundations, along with the top cards of each reserve pile.

When play goes on a stand still (when the tableau and the reserve no longer yield playable cards), the player is then entitled to three redeals. To do a redeal, the player picks up the first tableau pile and places it over the second pile, picks up that newly formed pile and puts it over the third pile, and these three piles are then laid over the fourth pile. Then, the piles are turned face-down to form the new stock, and the remaining reserve piles are placed under it. On the first two redeals, the process of dealing one card on each of the four tableau piles and two more on the reserve faced down, stopping each time to make any play, and using the reserve when the stock runs out is repeated. But on the last redeal, there is no more reserve; all cards are dealt four at a time, one on each tableau pile.

The game ends soon after the stock runs out in the last redeal. The game is out when all cards end up in the foundations.

== Parisienne ==
Parisienne (also known as La Parisienne or Parisian) is a variant of Grand Duchess. The game is played like Grand Duchess except the before the game starts, one ace and one king of each suit is removed from the pack and placed on the foundations.

== See also ==
- Sir Tommy
- List of patiences and card solitaires
- Glossary of patience and card solitaire terms

== Literature ==
- Cadogan, Lady Adelaide (1874). Illustrated Games of Patience. London: Sampson Low, Marston, Low & Searle.
- Dick, William Brisbane (1883). Dick's Games of Patience, Or, Solitaire with Cards. 44 games. New York: Dick & Fitzgerald. Mostly plagiarised from Cadogan.
- Whitmore Jones, Mary (1888,90). Games of Patience for One or More Players. 1st Series. L: L. Upcott Gill.
- Morehead, A. H. & Geoffrey Mott-Smith (1950). Complete Book of Patience. London: Faber & Faber.
- Parlett, David (1979). The Penguin Book of Patience, London: Penguin. ISBN 0-7139-1193-X
