= Imaginary Thirteen =

Card game

Imaginary Thirteen is a solitaire card game which is played with two decks of playing cards. Its gameplay makes it a two-deck version of Calculation and its name is taken from the fact that when a sum is over thirteen, thirteen (from out of nowhere) is subtracted to get the value of the next card, with spot cards worth their face value, jacks eleven, queens twelve, and kings thirteen.

== Rules ==
To set up the tableau, an ace, a deuce (two), a trey (three), a four, a five, a six, a seven, and an eight are removed and placed in a row. These cards are markers which remind the player on the number to be added to the top card of the foundations to be placed under them.

Then eight cards are placed under the marker cards, each supposedly double the value of the card above it. Therefore, a deuce is placed below the ace, a four below the deuce, a six below the three, an eight below the four, a ten below the five, and a queen below the six. Since $7 * 2 = 14$ and $14 - 13 = 1$, an ace is placed below the seven. Also, $8 * 2 = 16$ and $16 - 13 = 3$, which puts a trey under the eight. The illustration below shows the arrangement.

| A | 2 | 3 | 4 | 5 | 6 | 7 | 8 |
|---|---|---|---|---|---|---|---|
| 2 | 4 | 6 | 8 | 10 | Q | A | 3 |

These eight new cards will be the bases for the eight foundations, each would be built up regardless of suit to kings in intervals each indicated by the marker cards, i.e. the foundation under the ace is built up by ones, the foundation under the deuce built up by twos, the foundation under the trey built up by threes, and so on. Whenever the total goes over thirteen, it is deducted by thirteen to get the value of the next card. The table below illustrates the sequences in the building the foundations below.

Foundations and Markers
| A | 2 | 3 | 4 | 5 | 6 | 7 | 8 | 9 | 10 | J | Q | K |
| 2 | 4 | 6 | 8 | 10 | Q | A | 3 | 5 | 7 | 9 | J | K |
| 3 | 6 | 9 | Q | 2 | 5 | 8 | J | A | 4 | 7 | 10 | K |
| 4 | 8 | Q | 3 | 7 | J | 2 | 6 | 10 | A | 5 | 9 | K |
| 5 | 10 | 2 | 7 | Q | 4 | 9 | A | 6 | J | 3 | 8 | K |
| 6 | Q | 5 | J | 4 | 10 | 3 | 9 | 2 | 8 | A | 7 | K |
| 7 | A | 8 | 2 | 9 | 3 | 10 | 4 | J | 5 | Q | 6 | K |
| 8 | 3 | J | 6 | A | 9 | 4 | Q | 7 | 2 | 10 | 5 | K |

The gameplay is composed of taking a card from the stock. If it can be played on the foundations, it is placed there in the appropriate foundation. Otherwise, it is placed in one of four waste piles. The top card of each waste pile is available for play. At any time, after a card is placed in the foundations, the player would check the top cards of the waste piles to see if any more plays are possible. This process is repeated until the stock is depleted.

The game is won when all cards have been played to the foundations after the stock runs out. The game is lost, however, if there are no more plays after the stock runs out.

== See also ==
- Calculation
- List of solitaires
- Glossary of solitaire
