= Moojub =

Card game

- A card solitaire game
- Origin: US
- Type: Reserved builder
- Family: Windmill
- Deck: Double 52-card

Moojub is a card solitaire which is played using one deck of playing cards. It was invented by Geoffrey Mott-Smith and Albert H. Morehead around 1950. It is also one of the easier games to win: a player can win half of all games played.

== Rules ==
To start, four cards are dealt in a column, forming a reserve. To form the first foundation column, the player has to pick out the card with the lowest value (aces are ranked low in this case). Then the card with the next lowest value in a different suit is placed under the first card, below that a card of a third, and a card of a fourth suit, forming the first foundation column with each card the lowest one in each suit at the time. The order of suits in the first foundation column determines the order of suits in the other columns. The foundations are built up by suit; they are also round-the-corner, i.e. an ace can be placed on a king; in turn a two can be played on the ace.

Cards are then dealt continuously in batches of four, one on each reserve pile. If a card can be built on a foundation, it must be built. However, if the card cannot be built, the player can use it as a base for a new foundation pile, provided that:

- Each foundation column must contain all suits before a new one is formed. It should also be put in order from top to bottom,
- Each new foundation card should be of the same suit as its left-hand neighbor, and
- If there are at least two cards of the same suit that are available as bases, the lower-ranked one is taken.

The reserve is only ever filled by the subsequent dealing of cards.

The game is won when the stock is exhausted and all cards are in the foundation columns.

== See also ==
- List of patiences and solitaires
- Glossary of patience and solitaire terms
