= Nestor (solitaire) =

Card game

- A Patience game
- A game of Nestor from Professor Hoffmann's Illustrated Book of Patience Games.
- Family: Adding and pairing
- Deck: Single 52-card

Nestor is a patience or solitaire card game played with a single deck of standard playing cards. The object is the removal of pairs of cards with the same value from a layout of six rows of eight face-up cards and four additional face-up cards.

== Rules ==
As described in Louis Hoffmann's book The Illustrated Book of Patience Games (1892), Nestor is played as follows:

- Cards are dealt into eight columns of six cards. They are dealt in such a way that no two cards in the same column have the same rank. To avoid that, the identically ranking card is placed at the bottom of the deck and a new one is dealt.
- Once the eight columns are dealt, the four remaining cards are placed either face-up or face-down in a row above or below the columns. These four cards will be the reserve.
- Play is composed of removing pairs of cards with the same rank (such as two kings or two 7s). All cards in the reserve and the top card of each column are available for play. Once a pair has been removed, new cards become exposed and available for play.
- The game is won once all cards are discarded.

== Variations ==
Several variations exist. One alternative rule in this game is after the eight columns are dealt, the reserve cards are placed as one overlapping row and the top card is the only one available for play.

In the variant Vertical, seven columns of six cards each are dealt, with a reserve of 10 cards. With fewer buried cards, this increases the odds of winning.

In the variant Doublets, twelve columns of four cards each are dealt, with a reserve of four cards.

== See also ==
- List of solitaires
- Glossary of solitaire
