= Zodiac (solitaire) =

Zodiac is a solitaire card game which is played with two decks of playing cards shuffled together. An old game, it first appeared in Lady Adelaide Cadogan's book Illustrated Games of Patience. It is so-named probably because of its "globe"-shaped layout. It had many variations until its rules were standardized in 1914.

== Rules ==
First, eight cards are dealt in a row. They form the cells which make up the reserve, or the "Equator". Each reserve cell can only hold one card. Then twenty four cards are dealt in a circle surrounding the Equator to form the tableau, or the "Zodiac."

The game is divided into two phases: the first phases consists of playing the rest of the cards into the Zodiac and the Equator; the second phase is the building of the cards into the foundations.

In the first phase of the game, the cards in the Zodiac are built up or down by suit; the build can change direction in the same pile. However, the cards in Zodiac cannot be touched until the second phase. This means that until the second phase starts, the cards in the Zodiac cannot be used to build on each other. Also, any card build on a pile in the Zodiac stays there until the start of the second phase.

The cards on the Equator are used to build on the cards on the Zodiac. The space in the Equator can be filled with an available card from the stock or the top card of the wastepile. However, filling a space is not compulsory, i.e. a player can leave a space open for as long as the player finds it advantageous.

Meanwhile, the stock is dealt one card at a time, and unplayable cards are placed on a wastepile, the top card of which is available to be built on a pile in the Zodiac or to fill a space on the Equator. Once the stock runs out, the player can just pick up the remaining cards in the wastepile and turn it face down to make it the new stock. The player can do this as many times as he wants as long as there still more cards neither in the Zodiac nor in the Equator.

Only when all cards are both in the Zodiac and in the Equator, the second phase begins. The cards in the Zodiac and Equator are built straight to the foundations. The foundations are built up by suit from Aces to Kings. The game is won when all the cards are built on the foundations.

At any point in the game, when it becomes stuck, i.e. the cards in the stock/wastepile cannot be built without blocking other cards during the first phase, or encountering a block during the second phase, the game is lost.

== Strategy ==
The player must have great care and consideration in building the cards in the Zodiac in order for the game to be won. Also, the layout of the game is large when played with standard-sized playing cards. So, as a suggestion, the player can just deal eight cards for the Equator and twenty-four cards for the Zodiac to save space.

== See also ==
- List of solitaire games
- Glossary of solitaire terms
