= Rosamund's Bower =

Patience card game

- Patience card game
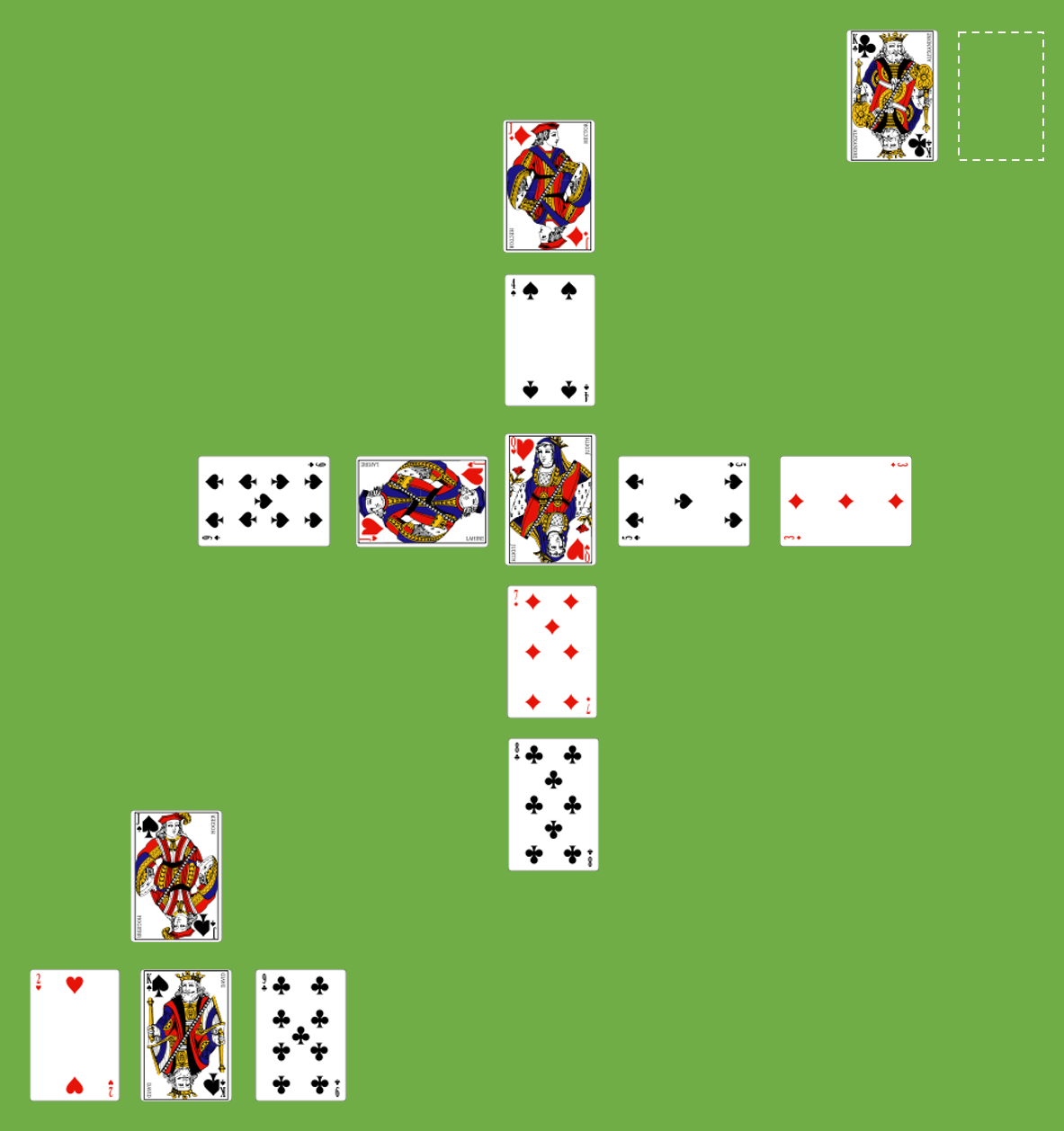
- "Rosamond's Bower Patience" (Jones, 1898).
- Origin: England
- Alternative names: Rosamund, Rosamond's Bower Patience
- Type: Planner
- Deck: Single 52-card
- Playing time: 10 min
- Odds of winning: 1 in 4

Rosamund's Bower, also called Rosamund, is a pictorial game of patience or card solitaire that uses a single pack of 52 playing cards. Peter Arnold, author of the 2011 book Card Games for One, connects it to Rosamund Clifford, known as "Fair Rosamund", the mistress of King Henry II of England. The aim is to unite Rosamund and Henry at the top of the single foundation pile. Meanwhile, the "sinister object" of the Jack of Spades is to dispose of Henry and the guards and capture Rosamund.

== History ==
The game is first described as Rosamond's Bower Patience in 1898 by Mary Whitmore Jones and has been periodically described in English sources since, notably by Dalton (1948), Parlett (1979) and Arnold (2011). It is normally called Rosamund's Bower, but Parlett calls it Rosamund and gives Rosamund's Bower as an alternative. Only Whitmore Jones uses the spelling Rosamond.

== Background ==
The background is a legendary story that King Henry II of England adopted Rosamund Clifford as his mistress. Rosamund was reputed to be one of the great beauties of the 12th century, inspiring ballads, poems, stories, and paintings. To conceal his illicit amours from his queen, Eleanor of Aquitaine, Henry conducted them within the innermost recesses of an elaborate maze, "Rosamund's Bower", which he laid out in his park at Woodstock Palace in Oxfordshire. However, Eleanor heard rumours of the affair and made her way through the labyrinth to force Rosamund to choose between a dagger and a bowl of poison. Rosamund chose the poison and died.

Based on this story, Arnold states that the aim of this game is to "reunite Rosamund and Henry" by succeeding in building its single foundation up to the final Ace, which is then followed by King Henry and then Fair Rosamund herself.

== Rules ==
First, Rosamund (♥Q), Henry (♣K) and the ♠J are removed from a single pack of 52 cards. Rosamund is placed in the centre of the tableau and eight cards arranged in the form of a cross around her; these are the "guards of her bower". Henry is placed at the top right of the tableau and the ♠J at the bottom right. A packet of seven cards is placed face down and to the right of the King as a reserve or "extra guards."

The ♠J is the base card of the single foundation which must be built on in descending sequence, regardless of suit, with Kings following Aces. The outermost cards of the cross are available for play to the foundation. As soon as one is moved to the foundation, its place is taken by the top card of the reserve guard. Once the latter is exhausted, the outer cards are not replaced and an inner card becomes available once the corresponding outer card has gone.

Once any initial moves have been made from the guards, the stock is turned singly, cards being played directly to the foundation if possible or to any one of three rubbish heaps (or wastepiles) placed in a row at the bottom left of the tableau. The top card of each rubbish heap is always available for play to the foundation, but cards may not be moved between rubbish heaps. If an outer card of Rosamund's bower is suitable to be built to the foundation, it must always be taken in preference to a card from a rubbish heap.

When the stock is exhausted, the rubbish heaps may be gathered up - Arnold allows this "in any order" - and redealt. They must not be shuffled. Three re-deals are allowed. The game is won if all cards are built to the foundation with Henry and Fair Rosamund as the last two.

== Bibliography ==
- Arnold, Peter (2011). Card Games for One. 2nd edn. London: Chambers. ISBN 9780550102010
- Dalton, Basil (1948,64,67). The Complete Patience Book. John Baker. 234 pp.
- Parlett, David (1979). The Penguin Book of Patience, London: Penguin. ISBN 0-7139-1193-X
- Whitmore Jones, Mary (1898). Games of Patience for One or More Players. 4th series. London: L. Upcott Gill.

== See also ==
- List of patiences and card solitaires
- Glossary of patience and solitaire terms
