= Fourteen Out =

Patience or card solitaire

- A Patience game
- Alternative names: Fourteen Off, Fourteen Puzzle, Fourteen
- Family: Adding and pairing
- Deck: Single 52-card

The Deal (Cascade). Note that all cards are dealt face up

Fourteen Out (also known as Fourteen Off, Fourteen Puzzle, Take Fourteen, or just Fourteen) is a Patience card game played with a deck of 52 playing cards. As this game involves carrying off cards with a fixed sum, it belongs to the same family of games as Pyramid. The name refers to the goal of each turn to make pairs that add up to 14.

== Rules ==
The cards are dealt face up into twelve columns, from left to right. The first four columns therefore receive an extra card. The exposed top cards of each column are available for play.

As denoted by the game's name, the object is to discard pairs of cards that total fourteen. Jacks value eleven, queens twelve, and kings thirteen, all others (including the ace) at face value. So the combination of cards to be discarded are as follows:

- King and Ace
- Queen and 2
- Jack and 3
- 10 and 4
- 9 and 5
- 8 and 6
- 7 and 7

Once a card has been discarded, the card under it becomes available. The game is out when all cards are discarded.

== Strategy ==
Strategy of Fourteen Out involves identifying pairs that cannot be matched because of their position, and preemptively selecting other eligible matches. Potential difficulties arise when pairs are found in the same pile, or when two different matches are in potentially mutually blocking positions.

== Variants ==
Columns may be stacked rather than cascaded, thus obscuring not-yet-active cards. This results in considerably more blind play.

== See also ==
- Pyramid
- List of solitaires
- Glossary of patience and solitaire terms
