= Herring-Bone (card game) =

Solitaire card game

Herringbone is a solitaire card game played with 104 playing cards. It is also commonly known as Pigtail, Braid or by its original German name, "Der Zopf". While the game demands relatively little planning, it serves as a moderately challenging solitaire option. The English name was mentioned in Lady Cadogan's Illustrated Games of Solitaire or Patience in 1914.

== Rules ==
Start by constructing a central herringbone (or braid/pigtail) using 21 cards, positioned in the middle of the tableau. Next, allocate six free cells to the left and to the right of the bone, and place the eight foundations (four on each side) further out to the left and the right.

The objective is to build on the eight wrap-around foundations located to the left and right of the tableau. Only the bottom card of the herringbone is available for play. Building directly on the herringbone is not permitted. Four free cells connected to the center of the herringbone can be filled with the last card from the herringbone if it cannot be placed on the foundations. Additionally, all free cells can temporarily hold cards from the waste pile that might prove useful shortly.

== Variations ==
In Long Braid, the game starts with 24 instead of 21 cards in the middle, and cards from the braid/herringbone can be played to all free cells, not merely the four linked specifically to the herringbone.

Both "Herringbone" and "Braid" can each refer to two other solitaire games that are played with quite different rules.

== See also ==
- Backbone
- List of solitaires
- Glossary of solitaire
