= La Croix d'Honneur =

Card game

La Croix d'Honneur (French for the cross of honor) is the solitaire card game which is played using a deck of playing cards. It is a pairing game, and was first described in the French book Nouveau Recueil de Patiences, which was printed in Paris in 1885 by the publishing company Watilliaux.

== Rules ==
The cross in this game is an eight-rayed cross, composed of an inner circle and an outer circle, each having eight cards. The object of this game is discard all cards in pairs. A pair in this game refers to two cards having the same rank.

In the first stage, only the top card of the waste pile and of the cards in the inner circle can make a pair. Once a card leaves the inner circle, it is immediately replaced only by the corresponding card from the outer circle. Cards in the outer circle are not replaced.

After the stock runs out, the second stage begins, wherein the cards from the waste pile are used to fill empty spaces in the inner circle (not all however). The rule in which the top card of the waste pile should only be paired up with a card from the inner circle still applies.

The third stage begins once all the cards from the waste pile are either discarded or end up in the inner circle. At this stage, cards at the inner circle can now be paired with each other. There is no redeal.

The game is won when all cards are discarded.

== See also ==
- List of solitaire games
- Glossary of solitaire terms
