= The Plot (card game) =

Patience-type card game

- A Patience game
- Family: Fan
- Deck: Double 52-card

The Plot is a Patience game which is played with two decks of playing cards.

== Rules ==
First, thirteen cards are dealt, squared up, and turned face up. This pile makes up the reserve. Then a card is placed as the first foundation. Then, below the reserve, twelve cards are dealt in three rows of four cards each.

As they become available, the seven other cards of the same rank as the first foundation card are placed in the foundations as well, and all are built up regardless of suit until each contains thirteen cards. For example, if the card dealt after the reserve is formed is a seven, the other sevens should start the other foundations. But the other foundations cards are subject on this restriction: The first foundation must be built up first until it has thirteen cards. When the first foundation is finished, the other seven foundations can be started and built at the same time.

The top card of the reserve is available for play only on the foundations. The top cards of the tableau piles (initially containing one card) are available for play both on the foundations and on other tableau piles. The tableau cards are built down regardless of suit, and only one card can be moved at a time. Building in this case is round-the-corner, i.e. an ace is ranked between a king and a two.

Spaces in the tableau are filled using only cards from the wastepile or the stock (never from the tableau), but not immediately; the player can leave a space as long as one likes. During the restriction, while the first foundation is still being built, only a card that is of the same rank as the first card of the first foundation can be placed in a space in the tableau. Foundation cards in the tableau cannot be built on other cards or built upon, they can only fill spaces. Once the first foundation is finished (i.e. contains thirteen cards), any card from the wastepile or the stock can be placed on a space.

The stock can be dealt one at a time and unplayable cards can be placed on the wastepile, the top card of which is available for play. There is no redeal.

The game is blocked if it cannot be completed after the stock runs out. The patience is out when all cards are built in the foundations.

== Strategy ==
Because of the restriction, the player is advised to build on the first foundation as fast as possible so when that is done, the player can proceed in the building the other foundations.

Also, the use of the reserve is suggested in every opportunity, and the use of spaces must be maximized, since they may not filled immediately.

== See also ==
- List of patiences and card solitaires
- Glossary of patience and card solitaire terms
