= Royal Rendezvous =

Royal Rendezvous is a solitaire card game which uses two decks of playing cards shuffled together. It is also known as Royal Appointment.

== Rules ==
All eight aces and one deuce (2 cards) of each suit are separated for the shuffled deck of cards. Four aces (one for each suit) are placed in a row to form the Upper Aces. The remaining four aces are placed in a row below the Upper Aces to form the Lower Aces. Two deuces are placed at each side of the Aces. The formation of the Upper and Lower Aces and the Deuces should somewhat look like this:

| 2 | 2 | A | A | A | A | 2 | 2 |
| 2 | 2 | A | A | A | A | 2 | 2 |

Then, sixteen cards are dealt below the formation in any convenient way possible. As a suggestion, they should form two rows of eight cards. They form the reserve.

The above formation above represents the foundations. The Upper Aces are built up by suit to Kings. The Lower Aces are built up by suit in twos; same goes for the Deuces. Therefore, the building order is as follows:

- Upper Aces: 2-3-4-5-6-7-8-9-10-J-Q-K
- Lower Aces: 3-5-7-9-J-K
- Deuces: 4-6-8-10-Q

The sixteen cards in the reserve are available only to the foundations; they are not for building. Any space left behind in the reserve is filled by a card from the wastepile or, if one has not been built yet, the stock.

When no moves are possible from the reserve, the stock is dealt, one at a time to the wastepile. The top card is available to be played directly to the foundation or used to fill up gaps in the reserve. The stock can only be dealt with once.

The game ends as soon as the stock runs out. The game is considered won when all cards end up in the foundations.

== Related games ==
Other solitaire games which are similar to Royal Rendezvous (building up foundations by suit in twos, and using a reserve) include Odd and Even and Royal Cotillion.

== See also ==
- List of solitaire games
- Glossary of solitaire terms
