= Little Spider =

Little Spider is an old patience or solitaire card game of English origin using a deck of 52 playing cards. Because of its unique form of game play and dealing, it should not be confused with other solitaire games like Spider and its one-deck cousin Spiderette.

== Rules ==
Game play is composed of two parts. At first, eight cards are dealt into two rows of four cards each, with a space in the middle for the four foundations.

At the first part of game play, two aces of one color and two kings of the other should be found and transferred to the foundations. When at least one of them is available, it is built immediately; the kings are built down to ace while the aces are built up to kings, in both cases by suit. Game play in this part is composed strictly of moving cards from the two rows to the foundations. Cards from the upper row can be placed on any of the foundations, while cards from the lower row can only be placed on the foundations directly on top of it. Once possible plays are made, eight new cards are dealt from the stock, one on each pile, empty or otherwise. Once the entire stock is dealt, the second part of game play begins.

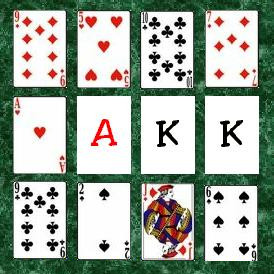
The game of Little Spider in progress, after 3 deals of eight cards. The Ace of Hearts was built after the third deal.

At the second part of game play, cards from both rows can be placed on the foundations as well as around the piles at both rows, building either up or down regardless of suit at the piles. Building is also continuous as a king can be placed over an ace and vice versa.

The game is won when all cards made their way to the foundations.

== See also ==
- List of solitaire games
- Glossary of solitaire terms
