= British Square (card game) =

Patience game

British Square is a patience or solitaire card game which uses two decks of 52 playing cards each. It is a fan-type game in the style of La Belle Lucie. It has an unusual feature of switchback building whereby each foundation is first built up (from ace to king) and then built down (from king to ace).

== Rules ==
First, sixteen cards are dealt onto the tableau into four columns of four cards each, turning it into a "square." American rule sets call for the formation of the tableau with sixteen piles, four rows of four piles each. Each pile contains one card at the start of the game.

The object of the game is to free an ace of each suit to make four foundations, then to build them up in ascending order by suit up to kings, then to build down in descending order, again by suit, from kings to aces.

The top card of each column is available for play, to be placed either on the foundations or on other columns in the tableau. In American rule sets, the top card of each pile is available.

When building on the tableau, they can be built either up or down by suit. But once a card has been built, it indicates the direction of building on the column; it cannot go both ways. For instance, when the 8♥ is placed on the 7♥, the next card to be built should be the 9♥. If the reverse happens (7♥ over 8♥), the next card should be 6♥. The direction can be altered by placing the top card of the sequence on an appropriate card in a different column. Furthermore, building is not "round-the-corner;" i.e., a sequence can be built only up to Kings/down to aces, it cannot "loop around" from kings directly to aces or vice versa.

Cards can be moved one a time. Any empty column is filled with a card from either from the stock or from the waste pile.

When moving cards on the tableau is no longer possible, the stock is dealt one card at a time and any applicable card is placed on the foundations or on the tableau. The stock can only be dealt once.

The game is won when all cards are built to the foundations. There are four foundations, one for each suit.

== See also ==
- La Belle Lucie
- List of solitaires
- Glossary of solitaire
