= Beetle (solitaire) =

Solitaire card game

Beetle is a difficult patience or solitaire card game using two decks of playing cards. The game is similar to Spider, except the Tableau cards are faced up. The object of the game is to group all of the cards into sets of 13 in suit.

== Rules ==
Beetle has ten tableau stacks. Six of these contain four cards, and the other four consist of five cards. The deck is present towards the bottom left.

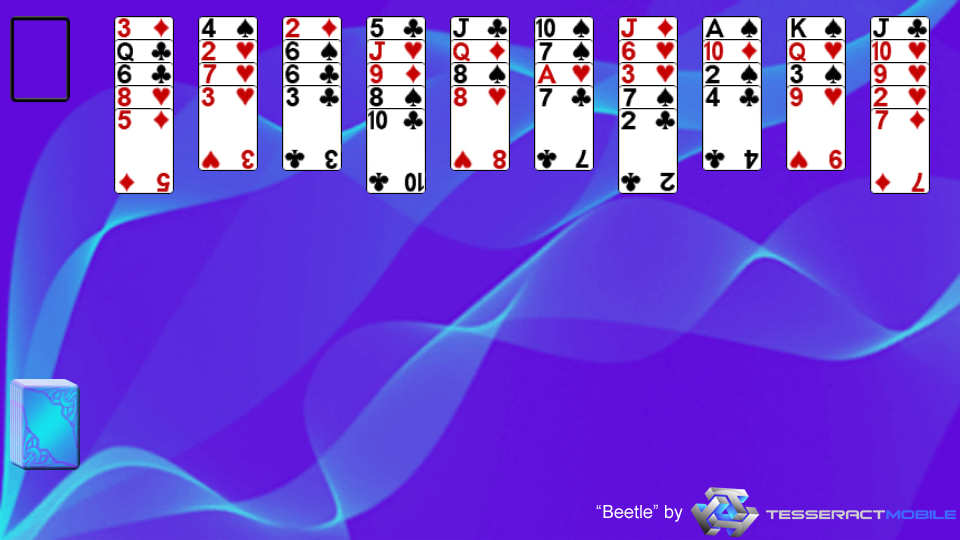
Beetle Layout

Group all of the cards into sets of 13 building down from King to Ace in suit (e.g. K♠, Q♠, J♠, 10♠...).

The Tableau Stacks can be built down regardless of suit, but ordered groups can only be moved if they share the same suit (e.g. If there is [4♥, 3♣, 2♣], only the 3♣ & 2♣ can be moved as a group).

Once a complete set of suited cards from King to Ace have been built, it will be removed from the Tableau. An empty space can be filled with any card or stack. When the gameplay comes to a standstill, click or tap the Deck to deal out one card to each Tableau Stack. The game is won after all the cards have been grouped into suited sets and removed.

== See also ==
- Spider
- List of patience games
- Glossary of solitaire
