= Six By Six =

- Deck: Single 52-card

Six By Six is a solitaire card game played with a standard set of 52 playing cards.

Winning depends mostly on skill, but even with strategic play the odds of winning are 1 in 15.

== Rules ==
The goal is to build each foundation up in suit from ace to king.

The layout consists of six columns each with six cards dealt to them at the start of the game. Aces dealt are moved to the foundations and replaced with another card from the stock, although this provision isn't followed by all sources.

Cards are dealt from the stock to the first column in the tableau. Building within the tableau happens by suit in descending sequence. A sequence of cards of the same suit can be moved together, and spaces in the tableau can be filled by any card. There is no redeal.

== Variations ==
The variation Thirty Six employs a similar set-up, but the biggest change is that cards are dealt from the stock to a waste-pile instead of to the first column, and suits are disregarded when building down in the tableau. This increases the chances of success significantly.

== See also ==
- List of solitaire games
- Glossary of solitaire terms
