= Royal Flush (game) =

Royal Flush is a solitaire card game which is played with a deck of 52 playing cards. The game is so called because the aim of the game is to end up with a royal flush of any suit.

The game is so mechanical in nature that there is currently no digital implementation.

== Rules ==
First, the deck is dealt into five piles: two piles of eleven cards and three piles of ten. The player first turns the first pile up and looks for either an ace, a ten, a king, a queen, and a jack, cards which comprise a royal flush. Once such a card is found, the search ends there, with the cards on top of it discarded and those under it left alone. The search then proceeds into the next pile and the search for other cards in the royal flush continues. Also, the suit of the first card found determines the suit of the entire royal flush. When a pile contains no card of the royal flush being searched, the entire pile is discarded. When another royal-flush card is found in a pile, the search continues until all five piles are searched and royal-flush cards are at the top of their piles.

Afterwards, the piles are placed on top of each other in the reverse direction of the deal. So if the deal is from left to right, once the search ends, each pile is placed on its neighbor to the left. (Morehead and Mott-Smith's rule said stated that the piles should be turned face down first before the piles are gathered). The discarded cards are set aside.

Then without shuffling, the remaining cards are dealt this time into four piles. After this, the search the cards of the royal flush begins again with the same procedure already stated above. Once all four piles are searched and regathered, the remaining cards (again without reshuffling) are dealt into three piles. The process continues, and after the gathering of the piles, the cards are dealt into two piles and the procedure begins once more.

When the two piles are regathered, the remaining cards at this point are then dealt into a single pile. Even at this point, the search stops when a royal-flush card is found and the cards on top of it are discarded. The game is won when the cards of the royal flush are the only ones left in the pile and are arranged in any order. If there are any other cards sandwiched among the royal flush cards, the game is lost.

== Variation ==
To give the game some variation, Lee and Packard suggests the player to try other poker hands such as four-of-a-kinds, full houses, or straight flushes. The player can simply look for a specific hand or look for certain cards to include in their hand while playing the game.

== See also ==
- List of solitaire games
- Glossary of solitaire terms

== External sources ==
100 Best Solitaire Games. Cardoza Publishing. 1 September 2013. pp. 51–. ISBN 978-1-58042-562-9.
