= Windmill (card game) =

Solitaire card game

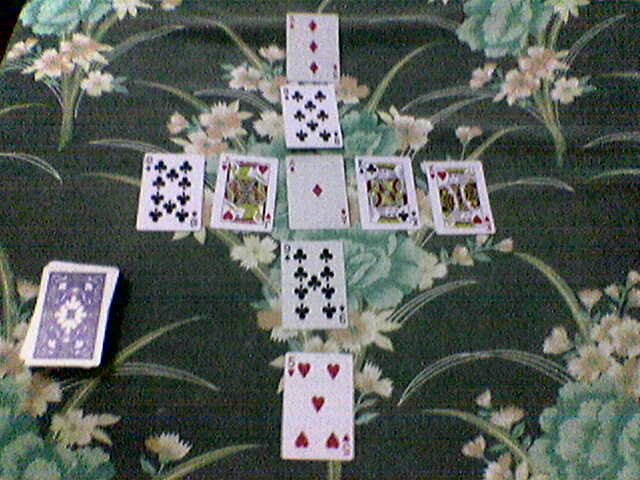
The layout of the solitaire game Windmill at the start of the game.

Windmill is a solitaire card game played with two decks of playing cards; it is a relatively mechanical game that isn't won that frequently. It is so called because of its distinctive initial layout, which resembles a windmill's sails. It is also known under the name Propeller.

== Rules ==
=== Set-up ===
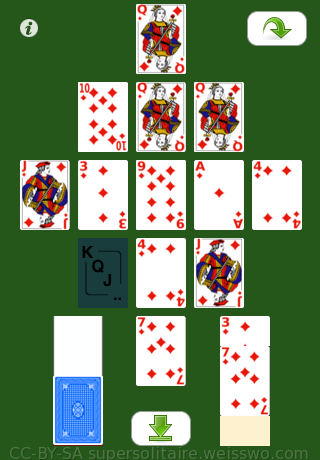
Windmill solitaire in progress

First, an ace is placed at the center. Then, eight cards are placed around it so that the layout looks like a cross. The ace forms the primary foundation, and the eight cards form the reserve. The gaps at the corners of the "sails" are reserved for kings and form the secondary foundations. The suits of the kings to be placed on the secondary foundations are disregarded. The object of the game is to build the primary foundation up to king with 52 cards in it and the secondary foundations down to ace with 13 cards each. All foundations are built regardless of suit.

The illustration below shows how the tableau is initially laid out. (A) is for the primary foundation, R for the reserve (8 free cells), and (K) for the secondary foundations, empty at first.

		R		
	(K)	R	(K)	
R	R	(A)	R	R
	(K)	R	(K)	
		R		

=== Game-play ===
The game starts by moving cards from the reserve to either the primary foundation or, if available, to one of the secondary foundations. Gaps in the reserve must be immediately filled by cards from the wastepile or, if the wastepile is empty, from the stock. If no more moves are possible from the reserve, the player deals cards from the stock one at a time to the wastepile, searching for playable cards. The player may also move the top card of a secondary foundation to the primary foundation, provided that the next card to be placed on the primary foundation comes from either the wastepile or the reserve.

When the primary foundation reaches a king, an ace can be placed over it. But when a secondary foundation reaches an ace, it can longer be built unless the ace is moved to the primary foundation.

The game is won if all cards are placed in the foundations: 52 on the primary foundation and 13 on each of the four secondary foundations. There is no re-deal of the wastepile.

== Variations ==
There is also an alternate variation wherein the direction of building on the primary and secondary foundations is reversed. In this variation, the primary foundation starts with a laid-out king and is built down while the secondary foundations start with the first available aces and are built up.

== See also ==
- List of solitaire games
- Glossary of solitaire terms
