= Monte Carlo (card game) =

Playing card game

- A Patience game
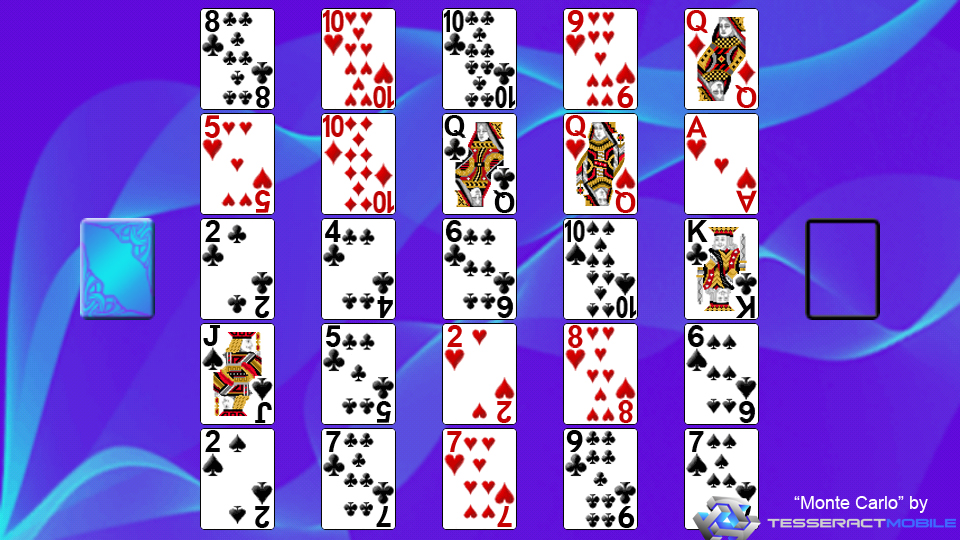
- Screenshot of Monte Carlo
- Alternative names: Double and Quits, Weddings
- Named variants: Monte Carlo Thirteens
- Family: Adding and pairing
- Deck: Single 52-card

Monte Carlo is a pair-matching patience or card solitaire game using a pack of 52 playing cards where the object is to remove pairs from the tableau. Despite its name, it has no relation to the city with the same name nor to any casino-related game. Alternative names for this game include Good Neighbours and Weddings.

== Rules ==
The game is set up by laying out 25 cards so that they form a 5x5 grid. The rest of the pack is set aside as the stock.

Cards that make up a pair (such as two Kings or two Sixes) are removed when they are immediately next to each other horizontally, vertically, or diagonally. Once some or all such pairs have been removed, the cards are consolidated, i.e. moving cards to the left as if towards the upper left corner to fill any gaps left behind by the discarded pairs. New cards are then laid out from the stock to form a fresh layout of 25 cards.

This process is repeated continues until it is no longer possible to remove pairs (e.g. in the finishing stages of the game one might be stuck with "4-6-4-6."). The game is out if all cards are successfully discarded.

Although luck is a large part of Monte Carlo, strategy can sometimes play a part. For example, one could leave a pair alone to be used to aid freeing a separated pair (e. g. two Queens that are left alone to unlock a Q-7-Q).

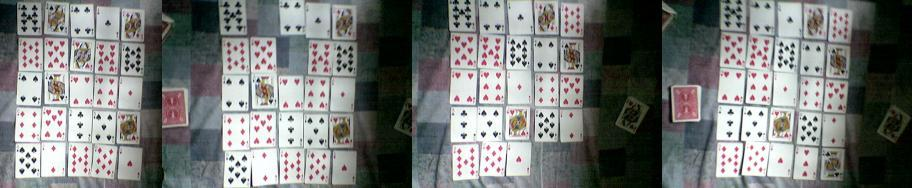
A game of Monte Carlo. From left, layout at the start of the game, and layout after pairs are removed, consolidation of cards, addition of new cards.

== Variants ==
- In a variant called Monte Carlo Thirteens, instead of pairs of cards with the same rank, kings and pairs of cards with values totalling 13 are removed during game play. Monte Carlo Fourteens is a variant where pairs totalling 14 are removed.
- The same layout is used for a variant called Fourteens, but instead of being adjacent, the pairs need to be in the same row or column. Aces Square simplifies this further by allowing removal of pairs of cards that match in suit (rather than in rank) and that are in the same row or column.
- A less common version of Monte Carlo has the initial 20 cards dealt to form a 5x4 grid.

== See also ==
- List of patiences and solitaires
- Glossary of patience and solitaire terms
