= Heads and Tails (card game) =

Solitaire card game

Heads and Tails is a solitaire card game which uses two decks of playing cards. It is mostly based on luck.

== Rules ==
First, a row of eight cards are dealt; this is the "Heads" row. Then 8 piles of 11 cards are dealt; this is reserve. Below them is another row of eight cards, the "Tails" row.

The object of the game is to free one Ace and one King of each suit and build each of them by suit; the Aces are built up to Kings while the Kings are built down to Aces.

Only the cards on the Heads and Tails rows are available to play on the foundations or on either the Heads or Tails row; the eight piles are used only to fill gaps. The cards on the Heads or Tails rows can be built either up or down by suit; building can change direction, but Aces cannot be built onto Kings and vice versa.

When a gap occurs on either the Heads or the Tails row, it is filled by the top card of the reserve pile immediately below or above it (depending on which row the gap is). But when a gap occurs above or below an empty pile, two different rule sets say the gap is filled with:

- The top card of the pile to the immediate left of the empty pile (Solsuite, BVS Solitaire Collection)
- The top card of any other pile. (Pretty Good Solitaire)

The game is won when all cards are built onto the foundations.

== See also ==
- List of solitaires
- Glossary of solitaire
