= Matrimony (solitaire) =

Matrimony is a patience or card solitaire game that uses two packs of 52 playing cards. It is a difficult game which depends mostly on luck and is sometimes mechanical.

While the words matrimony and marriage are synonymous with each other, this game should not be confused with Royal Marriage, which is sometimes also given the name Matrimony.

Like many patience games, there is more than one set of rules, and there are two main versions of Matrimony. The one described below is from Peter Arnold's Card Games for One.

== Rules ==
One Q♦ and one J♦ are taken out of the pack to form the foundations. As they become available during the deal, the two J♥ and the four black 10s (two 10♠ and two 10♣) are placed beside the two cards already present also form the foundations. After that, sixteen cards are dealt into two rows of eight cards each, forming the bases for the sixteen tableau piles. The foundations and the tableau may look like this:

Q♦	J♦	(J♥)	(J♥)	(10♠)	(10♠)	(10♣)	(10♣)
1	2	3	4	5	6	7	8
9	10	11	12	13	14	15	16

The Q♦ is built up to Jack, and all other foundations are built down, with the Jacks up to Queens and the Tens up to Jacks, all by suit and all round-the-corner, i.e. putting a king over an ace and vice versa. The cards to be used to build on these eight foundations are those put on the piles. The top card of each pile is available for play.

Once no more moves are possible, a new batch of 16 cards are dealt from the stock, one on each pile, filling any spaces in the process. Therefore, an empty pile is not filled until the next deal. In between deals, cards are moved onto the foundations. The dealing of new batches of cards and moving cards to the foundations continue until the stock runs out. From that point, a new special process of dealing begins.

Using the diagram above as a guideline, the player picks up the cards from pile 16 and deals them from left to right, starting from the gap it leaves behind and goes from pile 16 to pile 1 if necessary. Then the cards from pile 15 are picked up and deal a card to piles 15, 16, 1, and so on until they run out. Then the cards on pile 14 are done the same. This continues until all cards from pile 1 are dealt. The player must make a point to build appropriate cards to the foundations each time after a pile is dealt. Also, a pile with only one card is left untouched because once it is picked up, it is placed back there anyway.

The game is out when all cards are built into the foundations.

== See also ==
- List of patiences and card solitaires
- Glossary of patience and card solitaire terms
