= Birthday (patience) =

- A patience game
- Origin: Germany
- Deck: Single 52-card French pack

Birthday (German: Der Geburtstag) is a simple, German patience game, which is played with a French pack of 52 cards.

== Rules ==
Like most patience games, Birthday is a card game for one person. It uses a single Rommé pack of 52 cards.

Starting layout
and subsequent stages

Before shuffling, four cards are removed from the pack to form four foundations with a four-figure number that acts as a target. This number could be, for example, a year of birth, but it must not contain a zero. Now four pip cards of different card suits are selected that each have a value of one more than the target number. If, as in the example on the right, the number 1956 is the target, the values 2, 10, 6 and 7 are needed. These cards form the start layout or foundation.

After these cards have been laid out, the remaining 48 cards are shuffled and then taken, face down, into the hand as a talon. From this stock, cards are taken one after another and either placed face up on a discard pile or, if they have a card value one more than one of the foundation cards and are of the same suit (in ascending order), they are built onto them. In playing a card from the discard pile, the card beneath also becomes available and may be laid on the foundations. When the talon is exhausted, it is shuffled again and placed back in the hand and the process repeated until the talon has been gone through four times. If, after four passes, all the cards have been placed, the patience has been solved.

== See also ==
- List of solitaires
- Glossary of solitaire

== Literature ==
- "Der Geburtstag". In: Irmgard Wolter-Rosendorf: Patiencen in Wort und Bild. Falken-Verlag, 1994; pp. 47–49. ISBN 3-8068-2003-1.
