= Amazons (card game) =

- A Patience game
- Type: Simple builder
- Family: Discarding
- Deck: Piquet pack minus the Kings
- Playing time: 5 min
- Odds of winning: 1 in 10

Amazons is an old patience or card solitaire game which is played with a single deck of playing cards. The game is played with a Piquet pack minus the kings or a standard 52-card pack that has its twos, threes, fours, fives, sixes, and kings removed. This game is named after the female-led tribe, the Amazons, because the queen is the highest card, and all queens are displayed if the game is won.

== Background ==
Amazons is an old game, recorded as early as 1898 in the 2nd series of Dick's Games of Patience, where it is described as being played with a Piquet pack. Parlett points out that, like Puzzler, it is the short pack equivalent of the compulsive but frustrating game of Auld Lang Syne. As a 32-card patience, it is not commonly included in English games compendia.

== Rules ==
First, four cards are dealt in a row as the tableau, called the auxiliary row by Dick and the reserve row by Morehead & Mott-Smith. Above this is another row of initially four spaces for the foundations. Once an ace is available, it is placed on the foundations from left to right in the order in which they become available.

If an available card in the auxiliary row is immediately below the foundation of the same suit and is the next card in sequence, it is played onto that foundation pile. (Note: Morehead & Mott-Smith allow the Queen to be moved to complete its foundation pile from any depot in the tableau. This grace is not mentioned by Dick or Parlett.) The order of placing is in ascending sequence: A-7-8-9-10-J-Q.

When no more cards can be played, four more cards are then dealt, face up, one to each depot, covering any cards already there. (Note: Parlett allows cards to be overlapped as a column.) The player pauses again to see if any of the cards dealt can be placed on the foundations. Spaces are not filled until the next deal. This process is repeated until the talon runs out. When it does, a new one is formed by picking up each pile in turn, turning them face down and dealing again; this should be done without reshuffling. (Note: Parlett specifies that the 'columns' are gathered up from left to right; Dick says "take the auxiliary packets up one upon the other in rotation from right to left".) The process of dealing the cards, building to the foundations, and redealing, is repeated without limit until the game is won or blocked i.e. lost.

The game is won when all cards are built onto the foundations, with the Queens at the top.

== Strategy ==
Given the unlimited redeals, one of the best strategies for winning Amazons in as many as half the games played is to only play one Ace at a time rather than all of them initially, working on a single foundation at a time, and only playing another Ace when stuck despite redealing.

== See also ==
- List of patiences and solitaires
- Glossary of patience and solitaire terms

== Literature ==
- Dick, Harris B. (1898). Dick's Games of Patience. Second series. 70 games. NY: Dick & Fitzgerald.
- Liflander, Pamela (2002). The Little Book of Solitaire. Philadelphia, PA: Running Press. ISBN 0-7624-1381-6
- Morehead, Albert and Geoffrey Mott-Smith (2001). The Complete Book of Solitaire and Patience. Slough: Foulsham. ISBN 0-572-02654-4
- Parlett, David (1979). The Penguin Book of Patience, London: Penguin. ISBN 0-7139-1193-X
