= Queen's Audience =

Card game

- A Patience game
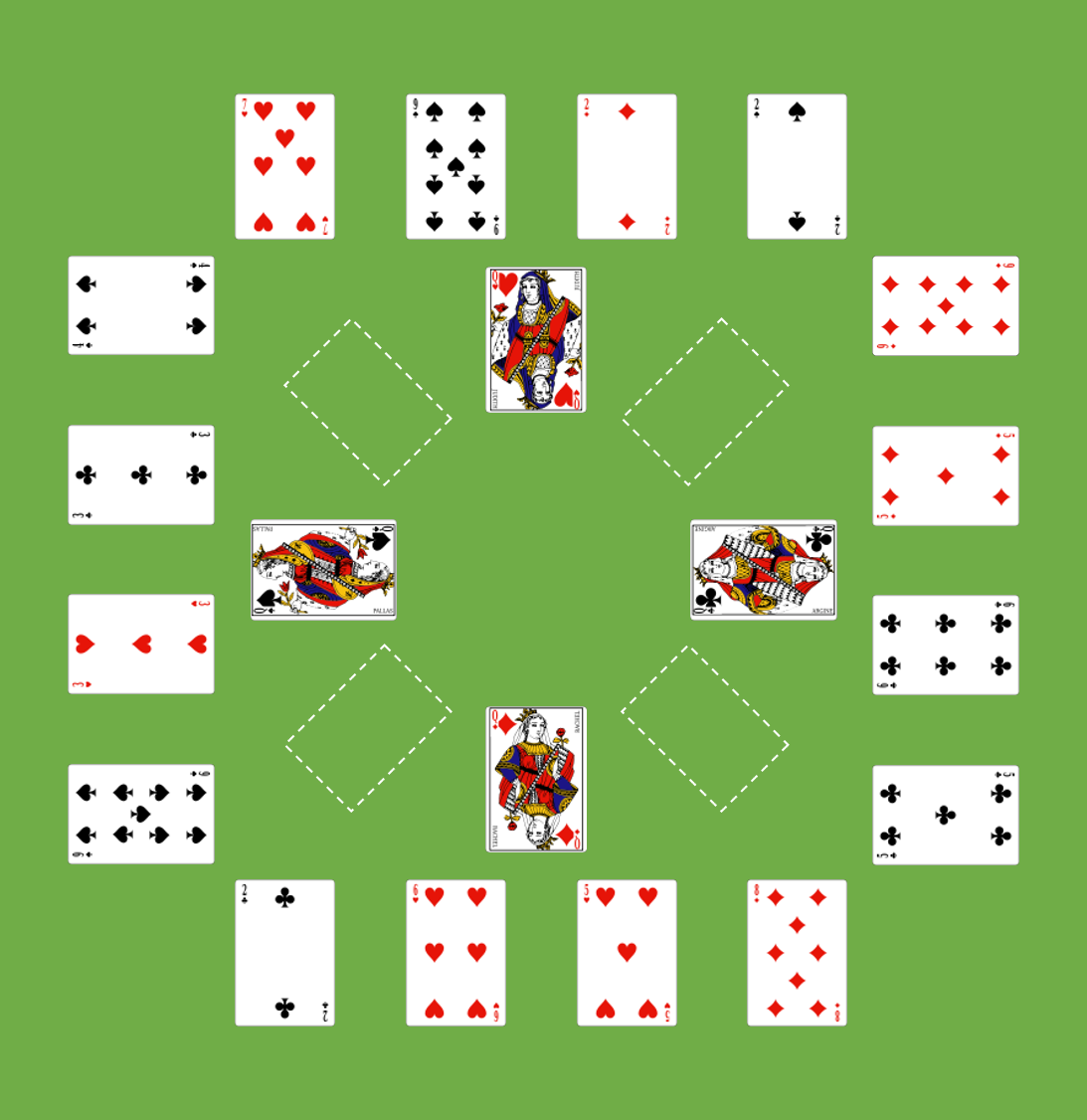
- Queen's Audience with circular audience chamber
- Origin: US
- Alternative names: King's Audience
- Type: Reserved builder
- Family: Carpet-like
- Deck: Single 52-card
- Playing time: 4 or 5 min
- Odds of winning: 3 in 4 or 1 in 2

Queen's Audience, sometimes known as King's Audience, is a pictorial patience or solitaire card game which uses a single pack of 52 playing cards. It is so named because the Jacks and their 'entourage' end up adjacent to their respective Queens (or Kings) as if having an audience with them.

== History ==
The game first appears as The Queen's Audience in the 1883 edition of William Brisbane Dick's Games of Patience or Solitaire with Cards. The name 'King's Audience' is first used, as an alternative, by Coops in 1939, but only Morehead & Mott-Smith give this as the main name. The rules have remained unaltered since Dick (1883); only the layout of the audience chamber varies. In Dick's original version it is arranged in a circle with the ♥Q at the top, ♦Q at the bottom, ♠Q to the left and ♣Q to the right. The "Knaves" are placed between the Queens, but no order is specified; the cards are arranged radially like the spokes of a wheel (see infobox). Bonaventure has the audience chamber laid out in a square of 3 cards a side. The "thrones" are in the centre of each side and the Knave foundations in the corners. The key cards from top left are: ♣J, ♠Q, ♥J, ♣Q, ♦J, ♥Q, ♠J, and ♦Q. Coops uses a circle like Dick, but the cards are vertical, parallel to the sides of the antechamber. She follows Dick's placement and adds that the Jacks go to the right of their respective Queens. Morehead & Mott-Smith arrange the audience chamber in two rows, royalty above and foundations below. Moyse (1950) does likewise but collapses all the royalty into a single side-on pile. Parlett (1979) and Arnold (2011) follow Morehead & Mott-Smith.

== Rules ==
First, sixteen cards are dealt to form a square. These compose the reserve, or "antechamber." On the other hand, the area inside the square is called the "audience chamber." This is where twelve cards are to be placed later. The audience chamber may be laid out in any of the ways described above. All cards in the antechamber are available for play.

After the cards are dealt, the King and Queen of each suit, whenever both are available, are placed inside the audience chamber, Queen on top, never to take part in the rest of the game. Also, the Jack and the Ace of each suit, whenever they become available at the same time, are placed inside the audience chamber with the Jack on top; this pair becomes a foundation, to be built down by suit to the Deuces (Twos).

There is no packing between cards in the antechamber; they are only available for play to the foundations. When a card leaves the antechamber, it is replaced with a card from the wastepile or, if there is none, the stock.

When play comes to a standstill, cards from the stock are dealt one a time to a wastepile, the top card of which is available for play. The stock can only be dealt once.

The game is out when all cards end up in the audience chamber. On average, Queen's Audience can be won three times out of four.

King's Audience is identical except that the Kings are the top card in each King-Queen pair.

== Bibliography ==
- Arnold, Peter (2011). Card Games for One. 2nd edn. London: Chambers. ISBN 9780550102010
- Bonaventure, George A. (1931). Games of Solitaire: One Hundred Variations With a Single Pack. New York: Duffield & Green.
- Coops, Helen Leslie (1939). 100 Games of Solitaire. Whitman. 128 pp.
- Dick, William Brisbane (1883). Dick's Games of Patience, Or, Solitaire with Cards. 44 games. NY: Dick & Fitzgerald.
- Morehead, Albert H. and Mott-Smith, Geoffrey (1949). The Complete Book of Solitaire and Patience Games. New York: Grosset & Dunlop.
- Morehead, Albert H. and Mott-Smith, Geoffrey (2001). The Complete Book of Solitaire and Patience Games. Slough: Foulsham. ISBN 0-572-02654-4
- Moyse Jr., Alphonse (1950). 150 Ways to Play Solitaire. Cincinnati: Whitman.
- Parlett, David (1979). The Penguin Book of Patience, London: Penguin. ISBN 0-7139-1193-X

== See also ==
- List of patiences and card solitaires
- Glossary of patience and solitaire terms
