= Persian Patience =

Persian Patience (or simply Persian) is a patience card game which is played with two decks of playing cards. The unusual feature of this game is the fact that the two decks are decks used in Piquet and Bezique, i.e. those that have the Deuces (twos), Treys (Threes), Fours, Fives, and Sixes removed.

== Rules ==
The tableau is set up into eight columns of eight cards. The object of the game is to free all eight Aces and build each of them up by suit. In this case, when an Ace is placed on a foundation, the next card to be placed on it is a seven.

Building on the tableau is down by alternating colour. Only one card can be moved at a time. When a space occurs, it is filled with any available card.

When the player has done all of the moves he could possibly make, the player can gather the cards on the tableau, shuffle them, and redeal them into eight piles. This can be done only twice during the game (three deals in all). However, when no moves are made after a deal (whether the original deal or one of the redeals), the deal does not count.

The game ends long after the cards are dealt the third time. The game is won when all cards are built onto the foundations.

== See also ==
- List of solitaire games
- Glossary of solitaire terms

== Bibliography ==
- Parlett, David (1979). The Penguin Book of Patience, Penguin, London. ISBN 0-7139-1193-X
