= King Albert (card game) =

Solitaire card game

- A Patience game
- Type: Open packer
- Family: Klondike
- Deck: Single 52-card
- Playing time: 15 min
- Odds of winning: 2 in 5

King Albert is a patience or card solitaire using a deck of 52 playing cards of the open packer type. It is a conventional building game, and is said to be named after Albert I of Belgium and is a variant of Somerset. It is the best known of the three games that are each called Idiot's Delight because of the low chance of winning the game (the other two are Aces Up and Perpetual Motion).

== Rules ==
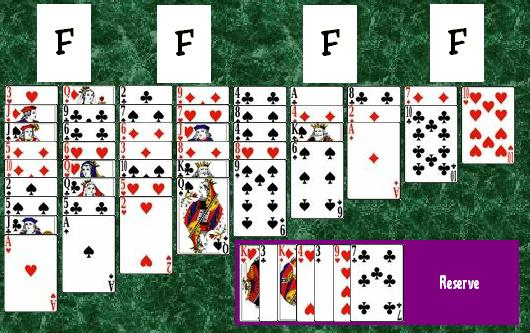
Initial layout

The aim, as in most patience or solitaire games, is to release the aces to the foundations and build each of them up by suit to Kings.

First, the cards are dealt into nine columns in such a way that the first column contains nine cards, the second having eight cards, the third seven, and so on until the ninth column has a single card. The seven left over cards form the reserve, sometimes known as "the Belgian Reserve."

Building on the tableau is down by alternating colors and only one card can be moved at a time. Only the top card of each column and all cards in the reserve are available for play as well as the top cards in the foundation. Furthermore, an empty column can be filled with any available card.

Once an ace is released, it can be built upon immediately.

The game is out when all cards end up in the foundations.

== Variants ==
Raglan is a popular variant of King Albert, and makes the game easier and achievable by starting with the Aces on the foundations. Other variant games include Somerset, Bath, Usk, and Morehead, the latter being named after Albert H. Morehead.

== See also ==
- List of patiences and solitaires
- Glossary of patience and solitaire terms

== Bibliography ==
- Arnold, Peter (2011). Card Games for One. 2nd edn. London: Chambers.
- Parlett, David (1979). The Penguin Book of Patience. London: Penguin. ISBN 0-7139-1193-X.
