= Aces and Kings =

Independent card game

Aces and Kings is a challenging and original solitaire game using two decks of playing cards, and was created by Thomas Warfield. The object of the game is to build 8 foundations down from King to Ace or up from Ace to King without regard to suit.

Aces and Kings is a difficult game to win, with good players winning about 1 in 10 games. It is a popular game that has been implemented on many websites and software programs that offer solitaire games.

== Rules ==
Aces and Kings has eight foundations in total. Four foundations start with an Ace and build up regardless of suit, e.g. A♥, 2♠, 3♦, 4♦.

The other four start with a King and build down regardless of suit, e.g. K♣, Q♥, J♠, 10♣

The games include two reserve piles of thirteen cards each that can only be played onto the foundations. At the bottom left, there is a stock pile and a waste pile. At the bottom right, there are the four tableau piles of one face-up card each.

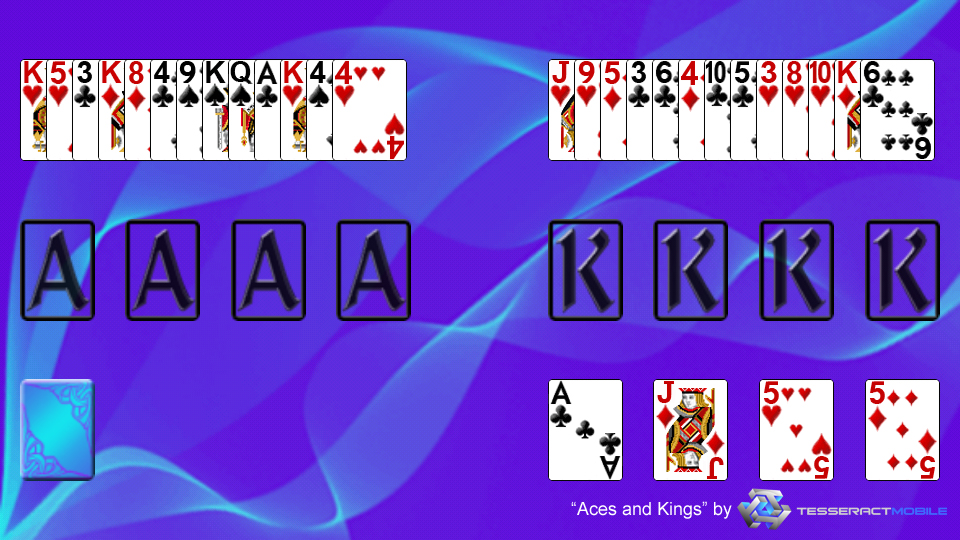
Aces and Kings layout

Cards in the tableau can only be moved to the foundations; empty tableau spaces should be immediately filled with the top card from the stock pile. If desired, the top card on a foundation pile can be transferred onto another one, as long as it is of compatible rank. When the stock pile is empty, the game is over: if all of the foundations can be completed, the game has been won.

== Variants ==
Other variations of Aces and Kings that were created by Thomas Warfield include Deuces and Queens, Acey and Kingsley, and Five Little Guys.

Racing Aces is a three deck version of the game, and Double Aces and Kings is a four deck version.

== See also ==
- List of solitaires
- Glossary of solitaire
