= Deuces (card game) =

Solitaire card game

- Solitaire game
- Origin: England
- Alternative names: Twos, The Twos, The Deuces
- Named variants: Courtyard, Square
- Type: Simple packer
- Family: Napoleon at St Helena
- Deck: Double 52-card
- Playing time: 10 min
- Odds of winning: 1in2

Deuces or Twos is a patience or card solitaire game of English origin which is played with two packs of playing cards. It is so called because each foundation starts with a Deuce, or Two. It belongs to a family of card games that includes Busy Aces, which is derived in turn from Napoleon at St Helena (aka Forty Thieves).

== History ==
The game is first recorded by Professor Hoffmann in 1892 as The Twos and subsequently by Dick in 1898 as The Deuces. These early rules do not seem to allow sequences to be moved between depots in the tableau and they are followed in this regard by Coop (1939) and Moyse (1950). However most later rules, including Morehead and Mott-Smith (1949, 2001) and Parlett (1979) allow sequences or part-sequences, as well as single cards, to be transferred between depots. Sources also vary as to whether no, one or two redeals are permitted. (Note: No redeals: Morehead & Mott-Smith (1949, 2001); one redeal: Dick (1898), Coops (1939), Moyse (1950); two redeals: Hoffmann (1892), Parlett (1979).)

== Rules ==
First, the eight two cards are separated from the deck and placed in two rows to form the foundations. Then, ten cards, four above the foundations and three at each of the left and the right of the foundations, are dealt. These are the bases for the tableau piles.

The foundations should be built up by suit up to kings, then aces. In the tableau, building is down by suit, also aces can be built upon by kings.

The top cards of each tableau piles are available for play on the foundations or on other tableau piles. Sequences, where in part or in whole, can be moved as one unit. Spaces in the tableau are filled only with cards from either the stock or the wastepile.

The stock can be dealt one card at a time, onto a wastepile, the top card of which is available for play on the foundations and on the tableau. There is no redeal

The game is won when all the cards are dealt onto the foundations with the aces on top.

== Variants ==
Two variants of Deuces, both of which are akin to Busy Aces, are:

- The Square: the twos are shuffled in the deck and there are 12 piles in the tableau, four each above, to the left, and to the right of the foundation spaces.
- The Courtyard: as Square, but with aces as bases for foundations.

== See also ==
- List of patiences and solitaires
- Glossary of patience and solitaire terms

== Bibliography ==
- Coops, Helen L. (1939) 100 Games of Solitaire. Whitman. 128 pp.
- Dick, Harris B. (1898) Dick's Games of Patience, 2nd Series. 113 pp. 70 games. NY: Dick & Fitzgerald.
- Professor Hoffmann [Angelo Lewis] (1892). The Illustrated Book of Patience Games. London: Routledge.
- Morehead, Albert H. & Mott-Smith, Geoffrey. (2001) [1st edn. 1949] The Complete Book of Solitaire & Patience Games. Slough: Foulsham. ISBN 0-572-02654-4
- Moyse Jr, Alphonse. (1950) 150 Ways to play Solitaire. Cincinnati: USPCC.
- Parlett, David. (1979) The Penguin Book of Patience. London: Penguin.
