= Martha (solitaire) =

- A Patience game
- Family: Bisley
- Deck: Single 52-card

Martha is a patience or solitaire card game that is played with a deck of 52 playing cards. It has a novelty of having half of the cards in the tableau faced down.

== Rules ==
First, the aces are removed from the deck and set up as the bases for the foundations.

Then, the rest of the deck is dealt into 12 columns of four overlapping cards each, with the top card and the third card from the top faced up and the bottom card and second card from the top faced down. To make this easier, here is a simple illustration of a column:

D
U
D
U<--- top card

The top cards of the columns are available for play, to be built on either the foundations or on other columns in the tableau. The foundations are built up by suit to Kings, while the cards on the tableau are built down in alternating colors.

One card can be moved at a time, but sequences that are already built can be moved, in part or in whole, as unit. But when a gap occurs, it can be filled only with a single card.

The game is won when all cards end up in the foundations.

== See also ==
- List of solitaire games
- Glossary of solitaire terms
