= Double Canfield (solitaire) =

Solitaire card game

Double Canfield is a patience or card solitaire game using two decks of playing cards. The object of the game is to move all of the cards to the Foundations.

== Rules ==
=== Layout ===
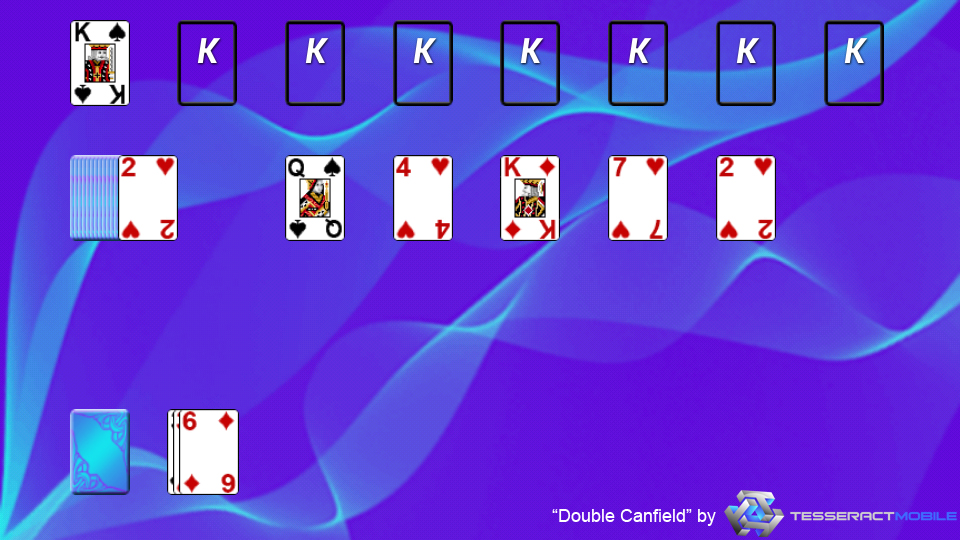
This image is a screenshot of the solitaire game "Double Canfield".

Double Canfield has eight foundations that build up in suit from rank of first card dealt, e.g. Q♣, K♣, A♣, 2♣...

There are five depots in the tableau of one card each that build down in opposite colors, e.g. 2♥, A♥, K♥, Q♥...

The reserve pile contains thirteen cards that can be played onto the tableau or foundations.

=== Play ===
Vacancies in the tableau are automatically filled with the cards from the reserve. If the reserve is empty, then the spaces may be filled by any card. Unlimited passes are allowed through the deck.

== See also ==
- Canfield
- List of solitaires
- Glossary of solitaire
