= Following (card game) =

Solitaire card game

Following is a patience or card solitaire that uses a single pack of playing cards. It is so called because a player has to follow a rotation of suits. It was first described in 1892 in Games of Patience by Mary Whitmore Jones and has since appeared in other books and software.

== Rules ==
At the onset, one has to lay six cards in a row; this will compose the tableau. The object is to remove the aces and build them up to kings. The catch of this game is the rotation of suits that the player must remember: A Club must be placed over a Heart, a Diamond over a Club, a Spade on a Diamond, and a Heart on a Spade. This rule applies to both the foundations and the tableau.

Building on the tableau is down, provided that the rotation of suits described above is followed. An entire sequence in any length can be moved, again retaining the rotation of suits. When the cards in the tableau are not sufficient for building, the stock is dealt one card at a time onto a wastepile. The top card of the wastepile can be used to build on the tableau and the foundations. Once the stock is used up, the wastepile is picked up to become the new stock. This can be done only once in the game. Also, spaces in the tableau can be filled up with any card, whether it is from one of the cards already in the tableau, the top card of the wastepile, or the next card from the stock.

The game ends soon after the stock runs out the second time. The game is out when all cards are built into the foundations, with the King of a foundation pile being the same suit as the Ace that started the pile.

== See also ==
- List of patiences and solitaires
- Glossary of patience and solitaire terms

== Bibliography ==
- Whitmore Jones, Mary (1892). Games of Patience for One or More Players. 3rd Series. London: L. Upcott Gill.
