= Casket (solitaire) =

Solitaire game using two decks of cards

Casket is a moderately easy solitaire game using two decks. The object of the game is to move all of the cards to the foundations.

== Rules ==
=== Layout ===
Casket has eight Tableau Piles located in the center of the game. These Tableau Piles form the "Casket". Located on top of the "Casket" are five face-up Reserve Piles that form the "Lid". In the center of the "Casket" are thirteen face-down cards known as the "Jewels". On one side of the "Casket" are eight Foundations that build up in suit from Ace to King, e.g. Ace♥, 2♥, 3♥, 4♥...

On the other side, the Deck and three waste piles are present. The Deck turns one card up at a time.

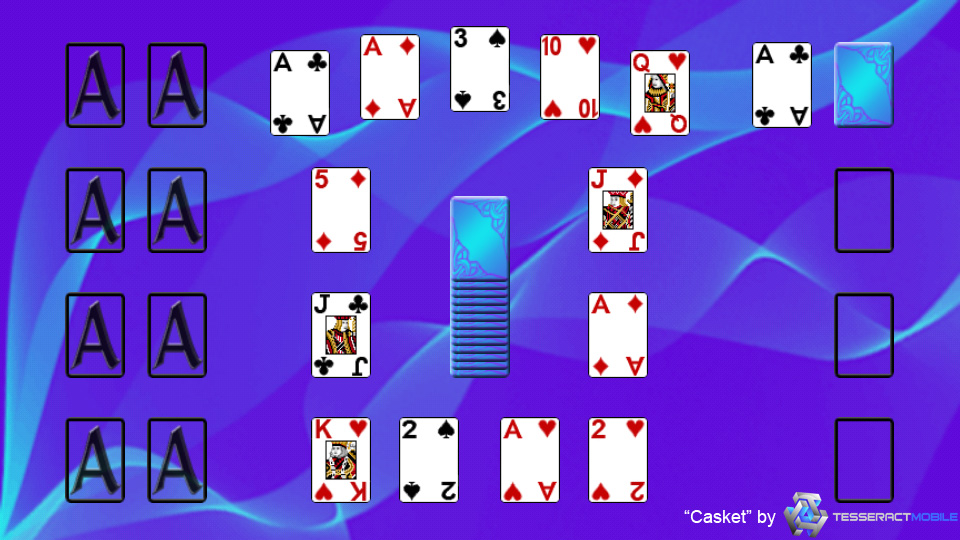
Casket Layout

=== Gameplay ===
In order to play with the "Jewels", the "Lid" must be removed first. Cards from the "Lid" can be moved to the "Casket" or onto the Foundations. The cards from the "Lid" are replaced by the "Jewels" after being played. After all the "Jewels" are removed, any card can fill the empty spaces in the "Lid". The cards in the "Lid" are not Tableau Piles, and cannot be built upon. The "Casket" builds down in suit, e.g. 7♣, 6♣, 5♣, 4♣...

The Deck automatically fills empty spaces in the "Casket". The cards dealt from the Deck must be moved. If there is not an appropriate place for the dealt card in the "Casket" or "Lid", the card must be moved to the Waste Pile. There are no redeals allowed in this game. The game is won after all cards have been moved to Foundations.

== See also ==
- List of solitaires
- Glossary of solitaire
