= Mount Olympus (solitaire) =

Mount Olympus is a solitaire card game using two decks of 52 playing cards. It is probably thus named because of the tableau's mountain shape and because if won, all the kings and queens are displayed, like the Greek gods and goddesses who were said to reside on Mount Olympus.

== Rules ==
First, all aces and deuces, or twos (16 cards in all), are removed from the two decks. Then the remaining 88 cards are shuffled and nine of them are laid out on the tableau in an inverted "V" formation. Although this is part of the theme that gives the game its name, the player can opt to just lay the nine cards in a straight line. These nine cards start each of the nine piles in the tableau.

Building on the 16 foundations is up by suit in intervals of two:

- On the aces: 3-5-7-9-J-K
- On the deuces: 4-6-8-10-Q

Building on the tableau is down, also by suit in intervals of two (i.e. the 5♠ must be placed on the 7♠). A card can be placed on an applicable card, but spaces are not filled. A sequence of cards (such as 6-8-10♣) can be moved as one unit. Any appropriate card can be placed on the foundations at any time.

Once all possible moves have been made or the player has made all moves he wanted to make, a new set of nine cards are dealt (Spider style), one for each pile. Moving, filling gaps with new cards, and dealing a new set of nine cards continue until the stock has been used up.

The game is won when all the cards are in the foundations with the kings and queens on top.

== Variations ==
The original German rules were included in Illustriertes Buch der Patiencen (published in about 1875) under the name "Der Olymp". These make no mention of a spider-style deal, or of moving sequences.

Being able only to move the top card of piles under the original rules is very restrictive, since empty spaces can't be used to move cards around. Descriptions in the 1940s started to allow entire sequences to be moved, and partial sequences soon after, and these are the rules most commonly used today.

== See also ==
- List of solitaire games
- Glossary of solitaire terms

s
