= Gate (card game) =

Card game

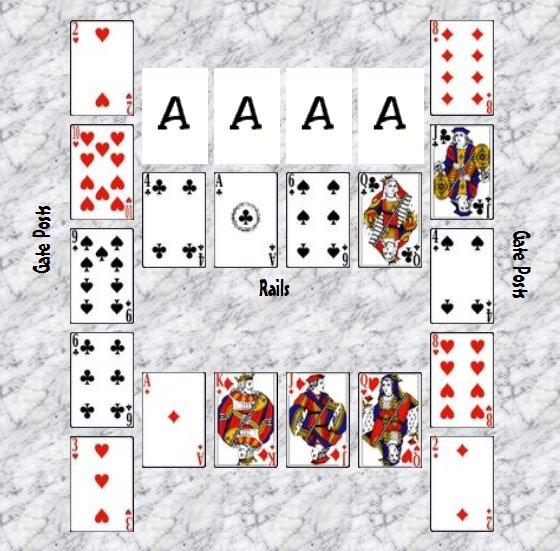
The initial layout in the game of Gate

Gate is a patience or card solitaire game played using a pack of 52 playing cards, and is a member of the Canfield family. It gets its name because the cards are laid out in such a way that they form a gate. Average players can expect to win 99% of their games.

== Rules ==
First, two columns of five cards are dealt face up. These act as the reserve or "gate posts." Then, between these columns, two rows of four cards are dealt, again face-up. These compose the "rails" or the tableau. The spaces for the foundations are allotted over the first row of cards.

The object of the game, as in many patience or solitaire games, is to find the aces, place then onto the foundations, and build each of them up by suit to kings.

The cards in the rails are available for play, to be placed on the foundations or onto other cards in the rail. The cards in the rails are built down by alternating colour (a card with a red suit over a one with a black suit, and vice versa). Spaces in the rails are filled using cards from the gate posts. If the cards in the gate posts are used up, the top card of the wastepile, or the next card in the stock if there is no wastepile, can be used to fill spaces. The gate posts are never replenished.

Generally, one card can be moved at a time, and the most prevalent rule regarding moves of sequences is that these can be moved as a whole.

The stock can be dealt one card at a time to a wastepile. The top card of which is available for play, either to be placed in on the foundations or on the rails, or to fill a gap on the rails. However, once the stock runs out, there are no redeals.

The game ends soon after the stock runs out. The patience is out when all cards are played to the foundations.

== Variants ==
Several variant ways of playing Gate Solitaire exist, including rules about which cards can be moved, and whether a redeal can be added. One common rule-set disallows moving sequences of cards, effectively making the game harder.

== See also ==
- Canfield
- List of patiences and card solitaires
- Glossary of patience and solitaire terms
