= Pharaoh's Grave =

Gallery style free cell based game

Pharaoh's Grave is a gallery style free cell based game played with 104 playing cards. It arranges the foundations as pyramid and when successfully finished, the Pharaoh, symbolized by the King of Hearts, is on the center bottom and the aces build the pyramid.

== Rules ==
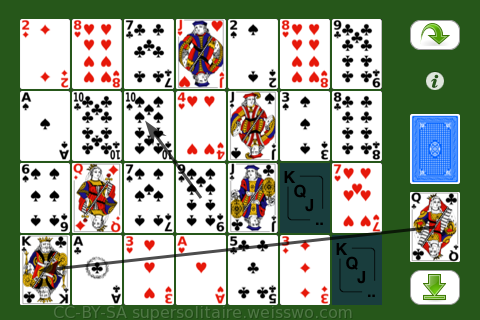
Pharaoh´s Grave Game Started

After starting the game any Kings and the Ace of Hearts need to be swapped to the correct location. This game can deal (rarely) unsolvable right away if no kings appear. Also, if two foundations of the same suit hold a card of their own suit (not the King) the game cannot be solved. Just start a new game, or fetch some kings from the stock and replace them to the right location, or swap cards on the foundations to avoid this. The whole tableau consists of free cells that each hold one card. It is not possible to move a card from the foundation to a free cell. Only from a foundation to the other.

The game is played by fetching card by card from the stock to the waste. Marry matching cards from the waste to the foundations or place them on empty free cells.

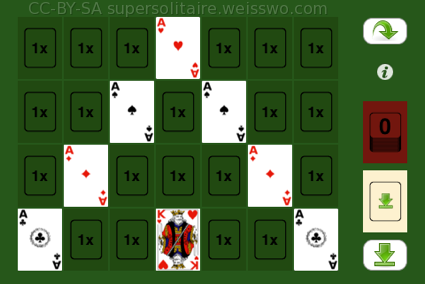
Pharaoh´s Grave Solved

The foundations, arranged as pyramid, have fixed suits. The starting cards are: K of Hearts (top), Kings of Spades (row 2), Kings of Diamonds (row 3), Kings of Clubs (bottom row) and Ace of Hearts (bottom center).

== See also ==
- List of solitaire games
- Glossary of solitaire terms
