= Päckchen =

Solitaire card game

- A Patience game
- Family: Open packers
- Deck: Single 52-card

Päckchen is a German card game of the patience genre. It is played using a single 52-card deck.

== Description ==
Päckchen is a 'combination patience' played with a standard English pattern pack of 52 playing cards. The four Aces are laid on the table as the foundations on which the suit families will be built in ascending order from Two to King. The remaining cards are placed on the table in 13 packets (Päckchen is German for packet or packets) of four cards each, face up.

To begin with the player checks to see if there are any cards e.g. Twos that can be built straight away onto the foundations. These are placed on the Aces of the same suit. Once that has been done, cards may be moved from packet to packet in order to reveal cards that can continue to be built to the foundations. Cards may only be moved to another packet if they are of the same suit as the top card of the new packet and in descending order So, for example, the Jack of Diamonds may be placed on the Queen of Diamonds; then the Ten of Diamonds onto the Jack of Diamonds and so on. As cards become available for the foundations they are built onto their families.

What is not clear from Heinrich is whether cards may be moved in groups from packet to packet nor whether the packets may be fanned. However, without both, this would be hard to solve.

If no further moves are possible, the first packet is placed on top of the second, then both on top of the third and so on until the last packet. The stock so formed is now turned and, without being shuffled, cards are placed back on the table in new packets of four. Again cards that can be used to build the foundations are moved first, then cards may be moved from packet to packet as before.

Play continues in this way until either the patience is solved or no more moves are possible.

== See also ==
- List of patiences and card solitaires
- Glossary of patience and solitaire terms

== Bibliography ==
- Heinrich, Rudolf (2011). "Die schönsten Patiencen". Perlag-Reihe (in German). 641 (35th ed.). Vienna. ISBN 978-3-99006-001-8.
