= List of solitaire games =

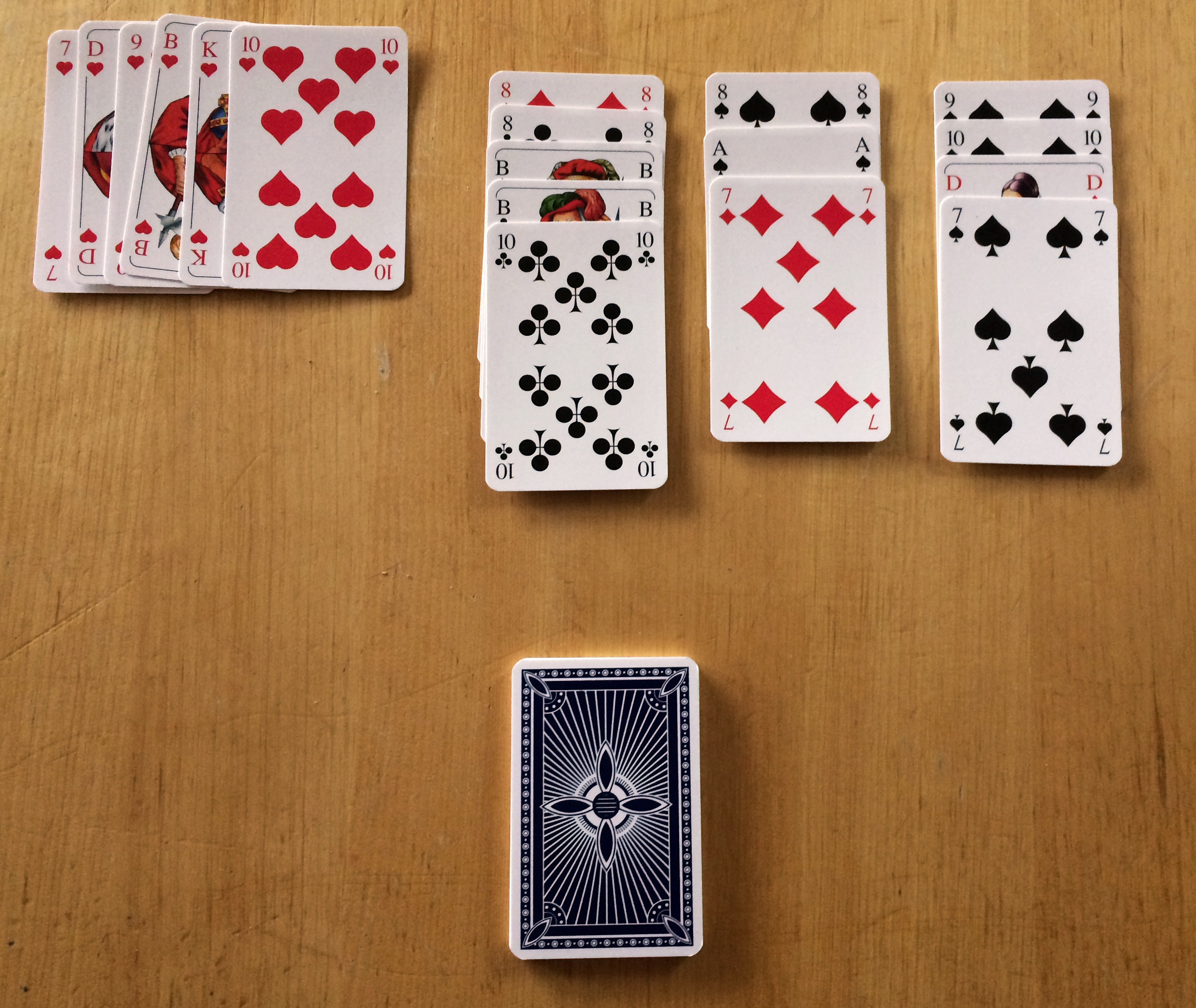
A game of Herz zu Herz under way

This is a list of solitaires, which are card games that are also referred to as patiences.

Klondike is a card game for one player and the best known and most popular version of the solitaire family.

This list is not intended to be exhaustive, but only includes games that have met the usual Wikipedia requirements (e.g. notability). Additions should only be made if there is an existing entry on Wikipedia that they can be linked to. To avoid duplicate pages being created, alternative titles and the names of variants are listed separately (except titles that include little more than the name of the parent game).

Games of the solitaire genre played by more than one player are marked with a plus (+) sign.

== A ==
- Accordion
- Aces and Kings
- Aces Square
- Aces Up
- Acme
- Addiction
- Agnes
- Alaska
- Algerian
- Alhambra
- Amazons
- American Toad
- Apophis
- Appreciate
- Acquaintance
- Archway
- Auld Lang Syne
- Australian Patience

== B ==
- Babette
- Backbone
- Baker's Dozen
- Baker's Game
- Baroness
- Batsford
- Beetle
- Beleaguered Castle
- Belvedere
- Betsy Ross
- Big Ben
- Big Forty
- Big Harp
- Birthday
- Bisley
- Black Hole
- Block 10
- Blockade
- Bowling Solitaire
- Box Kite
- Braid
- Brigade
- Bristol
- British Constitution
- British Square
- Broken Intervals
- Busy Aces

== C ==
- Calculation
- Canfield
- Capricieuse
- Carpet
- Carthage
- Casket
- Castles in Spain
- Chameleon
- Chessboard
- Cicely
- Citadel
- Clock Patience
- Colorado
- Colours
- Concentration
- Congress
- Contradance
- Corner Card
- Corner Patience
- Corners
- Corona
- Constitution
- Cotillion
- Crapette^{+}
- Courtyard
- Crazy Quilt
- Crescent
- Cribbage Solitaire
- Cribbage Squares
- Cruel
- Curds and Whey
- Czarina

== D ==
- Decade
- Deuces
- Devil's Grip
- Diplomat
- Double Canfield
- Double Klondike^{+}
- Double Solitaire^{+}
- Doublets
- Downing Street
- Dress Parade
- Duchess

== E ==
- Eagle Wing
- Easthaven
- Eight Cards
- Eight Off
- Eighteens
- Elevens
- Emperor
- Emperor of Germany
- Escalator
- Exit

== F ==
- Faerie Queen
- Fifteens
- Five Piles
- Florentine Patience
- Flower Garden
- Fly
- Following
- Fortress
- Fortune's Favor
- Forty Thieves
- Four Corners
- Four Seasons
- Four Winds
- Fourteen Out
- Fourteens
- FreeCell
- Frog
- Frustration

== G ==
- Gaps
- Gargantua
- Gate
- Gavotte
- Gay Gordons
- German Clock
- German Patience
- Giant
- Giza
- Glencoe
- Golf
- Good Measure
- Good Thirteen
- Grampus
- Granada
- Grand Duchess
- Grandfather's Clock
- Grandfather's Patience
- Grandmother's Patience

== H ==
- Harp
- Heads and Tails
- Herring-Bone
- Herz zu Herz
- Hide-and-Seek
- Hit or Miss
- House in the Woods
- House on the Hill

== I ==
- Idiot's Delight
- Imaginary Thirteen
- Imperial Guards
- Indian
- Indian Carpet
- Interregnum
- Intrigue

== J ==
- Josephine
- Jubilee

== K ==
- King Albert
- King Tut
- Kings in the Corners
- King's Audience
- Kingsdown Eights
- Klondike
- Knockout

== L ==
- La Belle Lucie
- La Chatelaine
- La Croix d'Honneur
- Labyrinth
- Lady Betty
- Lady of the Manor
- Laggard Lady
- Las Vegas Solitaire
- Last Chance
- Laying Siege
- Leoni's Own
- Limited
- Little Milligan
- Little Spider
- Little Windmill
- Long Braid
- Lovely Lucy
- Louis
- Lucas

== M ==
- Maria
- Martha
- Matrimony
- Maze
- Memory
- Millie
- Milligan Cell
- Milligan Harp
- Milligan Yukon
- Miss Milligan
- Montana
- Monte Carlo
- Moojub
- Mount Olympus
- Mrs. Mop

== N ==
- Narcotic
- Napoleon at St Helena
- Napoleon's Favorite
- Napoleon's Square
- Nerts^{+}
- Nestor
- Nine Across
- Ninety-One
- Nivernaise (La Nivernaise)
- Number Ten
- Numerica

== O ==
- Odd and Even
- Old Fashioned
- Old Mole
- Old Patience
- One234
- Osmosis

== P ==
- Päckchen
- Pairs
- Parallels
- Parisienne (La Parisienne, Parisian)
- Parliament
- Pas de Deux
- Patience
- Patriarchs
- Penguin
- Perpetual Motion
- Perseverance
- Persian Patience
- Persian Rug
- Pharaoh′s Grave
- Picture Gallery
- Picture Patience
- Pigtail
- Plait
- Poker Squares
- Portuguese Solitaire
- Precedence (Order of Precedence)
- Propeller
- Puss in the Corner
- Putt Putt
- Pyramid
- Pyramide
- Pyramid Golf

== Q ==
- Quadrille
- Queen of Italy
- Queen's Audience

== R ==
- Racing Demon^{+}
- Raglan
- Rainbow Canfield
- Rank and File
- Red and Black
- Roosevelt at San Juan
- Rosamund's Bower
- Rouge et Noir
- Royal Cotillion
- Royal Flush
- Royal Marriage
- Royal Parade
- Royal Rendezvous
- Russian Bank^{+}
- Russian

== S ==
- Salic Law
- Scorpion
- Seahaven Towers
- Seven Devils
- Sham Battle
- Shamrocks
- Simple Simon
- Simplicity
- Sir Tommy
- Six By Six
- Sixes and Sevens
- Sixty Thieves
- Sly Fox
- Solitaire
- Spaces
- Spanish Patience
- Spider
- Spiderette
- Spiderwort
- Spit^{+}
- Square
- St. Helena
- Stalactites
- Stonewall
- Storehouse
- Strategy
- Streets
- Streets and Alleys
- Stronghold
- Sultan
- Super Flower Garden
- Superior Canfield

== T ==
- Tableau
- Take Fourteen
- Tam O'Shanter
- Tens
- Terrace
- The Clock
- The Fan
- The Plot
- Thirteens
- Thirteen Up
- Thirteen Down
- Three Blind Mice
- Three Shuffles and a Draw
- Thumb and Pouch
- Tournament
- Tower of Hanoy (Tower of Hanoi)
- Tower of Pisa
- Travellers
- Trefoil
- Triangle
- Tri Peaks
- Tut's Tomb
- Twenty

== V ==
- Vanishing Cross
- Vertical
- Virginia Reel

== W ==
- Washington's Favorite
- Wasp
- Watch
- Weavers
- Westcliff
- Whitehead
- Wildflower
- Will o' the Wisp
- Windmill

== Y ==
- Yukon

== Z ==
- Zodiac

== Software solitaire games ==
This is a very select list of particularly notable and influential examples of software dedicated to solitaire games:

- Solitaire Royale (1987)
- Microsoft Solitaire (1990), Microsoft FreeCell (1991), and Microsoft Spider Solitaire (1998)
- Hoyle's Official Book of Games: Volume 2 (1990)
- Eric's Ultimate Solitaire (1993)
- Soltrio Solitaire (2007)

== See also ==
- List of card games
- Glossary of solitaire terms
