= Seven Devils =

Solitaire game

- A Patience game
- Family: Klondike-like
- Deck: Double 52-card

Seven Devils
- Players: 1
- Skills: Tactics
- Age range: 13+
- Cards: 104
- Deck: Anglo-American
- Rank (high→low): K Q J 10 9 8 7 6 5 4 3 2 A
- Playing time: Various
- Chance: Hard

Seven Devils is a solitaire game in the style of Canfield played with two decks of playing cards. It is considered to be a very difficult solitaire game.

== Rules ==
Two decks (104 cards) are used. Twenty-eight cards are dealt out to seven diminishing columns with the bottom card of each column face up, and a further seven cards (the "devils") are dealt face up to the right of the columns.

The aim is to move all the cards into thirteen-card sequences on the goal piles (at the right of the board), ascending in sequence and following suit, starting with the aces.

Cards on the table can be stacked red-on-black in descending sequence. Any card can be used to fill an empty column.

Only one card can be moved at a time. Some variations of Seven Devils let you move several cards if there are empty columns as if the empty columns were used as temporary spots.

The seven devils in the reserve stack cannot be placed on other stacks, and can be moved only to the goal piles.

== Difficulty ==
The difficulty of this game arises from four factors:

- Many games are not winnable from the start. If two higher cards overlie any card in the same suit in the reserve, the lower card can never be reached.
- Even if this is not the case, if high cards overlie lower ones in the reserve, the low cards can be very difficult to reach.
- If low cards, such as twos or threes, cannot be played to a column, they will be buried in the discard pile and become difficult to retrieve.
- Key low cards may be hidden face down in columns where they may well prove inaccessible.

== See also ==
- Canfield
- List of solitaire games
- Glossary of solitaire terms
