= Perpetual Motion (card game) =

Patience game

- A Patience game
- Alternative names: Idiot's Delight, Narcotic
- Family: Non-Builder
- Deck: Single 52-card

Perpetual Motion is a Patience game which has the objective of discarding playing cards from the tableau. The name relates to the time-consuming process of the game. It is also called Idiot's Delight or Narcotic.

The name Perpetual Motion is also the alternative name of another card solitaire game called Rondo or Eight-Day Clock. The name Idiot's Delight is also used to refer to two other unrelated games, namely Aces Up and King Albert.

== Rules ==
The tableau is made up of four piles or columns. Four cards are dealt (the rest are left aside as the stock), one in each pile. If there are cards of equal rank (such as three kings), the duplicates are moved to the leftmost pile with an equal card.

Example: The three kings mentioned are found at piles 2, 3, and 4. The kings in piles 3 and 4 are moved to pile 2.

After that, four cards are again dealt from the stock (even if one pile is empty) and plays already mentioned are made. Only the top card of each pile is available. In case the four cards dealt from the stock are all of the same rank, they are immediately discarded.

This continues until the stock runs out. After this first round, the piles are picked up, starting from the rightmost pile, and put over one another either faced down or face up without disturbing the order of the cards in each pile. Four cards are again dealt and the steps mentioned earlier are again done.

The game is out when all cards are discarded (in fours). This is not always possible, because cycles may occur: that is, the cards return to exactly the same sequence as one that has been seen previously.

== Variants ==
An alternate way to play, as suggested by Peter Drake in his book Data Structures and Algorithms in Java, gives players easier options for discarding cards. The object is still to remove all the cards from the table, but a player may also discard cards as follows:

- If there are two cards of the same rank showing, discard both of them
- If there are two cards of the same suit showing, discard the one with the lower rank

As a result, games end much sooner than with Perpetual Motion. But considering that the game can only end if the last two cards are of the same rank, the odds of winning are not in the player's favour.

Another variant that changes the Perpetual Motion less significantly allows players to move cards of the same rank to whichever column contains one of the matching cards, which also makes the game easier to win.

The outcome is also affected by the order the four piles are picked up and stacked between rounds.

== Computational analysis ==
Various people have used computer programs to play large numbers of randomized games of Perpetual Motion in order to analyze the outcomes. The likelihood of being able to complete the game, and the number of rounds before completing the game, vary greatly depending on the exact rules. According to one analyst, the game can be completed 54% of the time, with an average of 128 rounds before completion. With slightly different rules, that rate can drop to 8.67%.

== See also ==
- List of patiences and solitaires
- Glossary of patience and solitaire terms
