= German Patience =

Solitaire card game

German Patience is a solitaire card game which is played with two decks of playing cards shuffled together. It is an unusual game because building in the tableau or playing area is up, as opposed to building down in many others. Despite its name, it is not known if this game originated from Germany.

It is very difficult to win, and the winning odds for an average player are about 1 in 200 games. Thomas Warfield's solitaire game Bavarian is a variant that makes this an easier game.

== Rules ==
The object of this game is to form eight columns of thirteen cards each. Each column starts with any card and ends with the card a rank lower than the first. In this game, building is round-the-corner, i.e. an Ace can be built over a King and a Deuce (or Two card) can be placed over an Ace.

At the start of the game, each column in the tableau starts with one card. The cards in the tableau are built up regardless of suit. Only the top card of each column is available for play and cards are moved one at a time. Spaces can be filled with any card.

When there are no more moves that can be made, the stock is dealt one a time. Any card that cannot be placed onto the tableau is placed on the waste pile, the top card of which is available for play.

The game ends soon after the stock has run out (although some rule sets allow a redeal by picking up the waste pile and turning it face down to make a new stock). The game is won when all cards are built onto the tableau in eight columns of 13.

== See also ==
- List of solitaires
- Glossary of solitaire
