= Alhambra (card game) =

Solitaire card game

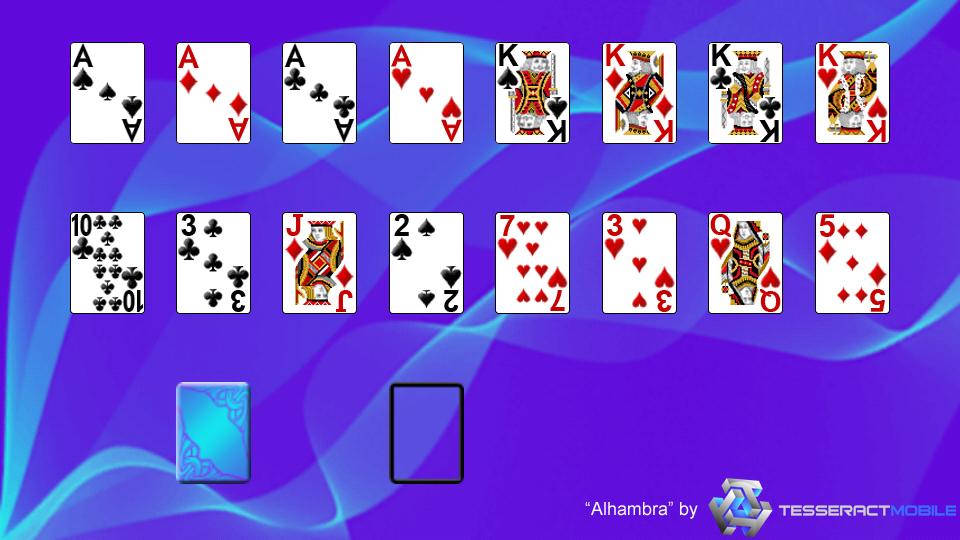
- Screenshot of Alhambra
- Family: Unique
- Deck: Double 104-card

Alhambra is a patience or card solitaire game played using two packs of playing cards. Its unusual feature is akin to that of Crazy Quilt: the cards in the reserve are built either on the foundations or onto a waste pile.

== Rules ==
One King and one Ace of each suit are separated from the packs to form the initial foundation piles: the foundations starting with Aces are to be built upwards in suit, the Kings downwards. There are also eight reserve piles dealt out with four face-up cards each. The remaining cards form the initial stock.

The stock is dealt out one card at a time onto a waste pile, where the top card is always available to be built onto the foundations. The top cards of the reserve piles are available to be built on the foundations, or onto the waste pile if they match the suit and are one rank higher or lower than the top card of the waste pile (wrapping between aces and kings is permitted). Building onto the reserve piles, or moving cards between them, is not permitted. Reserve piles that become exhausted are not refilled.

When the stock is exhausted, the waste pile (which by then usually includes some cards drawn from the reserve piles) is picked up and turned over (without shuffling) to become the new stock. This can be done a maximum of twice per game.

The game is over when all cards have been built onto the foundations (which constitutes a win), or when the stock has been exhausted for the third time.

== Variants ==
Variants of Alhambra include The Reinforcements and Granada.

== See also ==
- List of patiences and card solitaires
- Glossary of patience and card solitaire terms
