= Osmosis (solitaire) =

Card game

Osmosis (also known as Treasure Trove) is a solitaire game played with a deck of 52 playing cards. The object, like many solitaire games, is to put the cards into foundations, although not in numerical order. The name of the game reflects the fact that cards of the same value slowly filter through to successive foundations by osmosis.

Because winning the game relies on where cards are positioned in the reserve piles and in the stock pile, finishing a game of Osmosis can be difficult.

== Rules ==
Game play consists of four, vertically arranged reserve piles of four cards each (one face-up card on top of three face-down cards). A seventeenth card is put in the first (top) of four foundations, which are also arranged vertically to the right of the reserve piles. Cards with the same suit as this card must be moved to this foundation. The other three foundations are also built by suit, but must begin with cards of the same rank as the first card of the top foundation (the 17th card previously mentioned). Foundation piles are fanned from left to right. All undealt cards make up the stock.

To begin, the top cards in each reserve pile are the only cards in play and must be moved to the foundations if possible. A card can be moved to a foundation if a card of the same value has already been placed in the foundation above it. Once all possible cards have been placed in the foundations, the next face-down cards remaining in the reserve piles are turned face-up. When placing cards from the reserve piles is no longer possible, one can use the stock, deal three cards at a time, and use its top card to make possible moves. One can redeal the stock as long as there are possible moves from the stock or from the reserve piles to the foundations.

The game is won when all cards have been moved to the foundations.

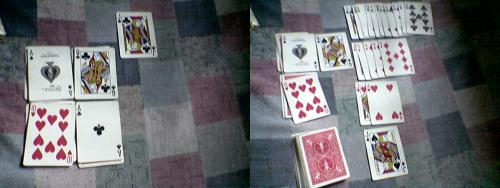
A game of Osmosis: (left) The layout at the start of the game, (right) a game at progress.

== Example of Play ==
Here's an example of gameplay (foundations only):

| ♥ | 7 8 10 2 4 9 K A |
| ♠ | 7 A 8 K 9 |
| ♦ | 7 8 K |

Legal and illegal plays in the example above:

- Any heart card can be played to the top foundation.
- The 10♠ can be played to its foundation, since the 10♥ has already been played to its foundation.
- The 2♦ cannot be played to its foundation, because the 2♠ hasn't yet been played.
- No club can be played to its foundation, because the 7♣ hasn't yet been played.

== Variants ==
Peek is an open variation of Osmosis where the reserve cards are played face up. Another Osmosis variant is called Bridesmaids.

== External Sources ==
- Barry, Sheila Anne, World's Best Card Games for One
- Day, Trevor. Collins Patience Card Games (The Diagram Group)
- Johnstone, Michael. Card Games for One
- Morehead, Albert H. & Mott-Smith, Geoffrey. The Complete Book of Solitaire & Patience Games
- Moyse Jr, Alphonse. 150 Ways to play Solitaire
- Parlett, David. The Penguin Book of Patience

== See also ==
- List of solitaires
- Glossary of solitaire
