= Gay Gordons (card game) =

Solitaire card game

- A Patience game
- Family: Adding and pairing
- Deck: Single 52-card

Gay Gordons is a patience game played with a single deck of playing cards. Gay Gordons is also known under its alternative name Exit, and was invented by David Parlett.

== Rules ==
It is played with a standard deck of playing cards, with jokers removed. A layout of five fanned piles of ten cards each is dealt face up, with the two remaining cards forming a fanned reserve pile.

If any pile contains exactly three jacks, the middle one is swapped for the top card of the reserve.

The top card of each pile and of the reserve is in play, and the piles cannot be refilled or built on. Empty piles cannot be refilled.

The aim of the game is to remove all cards by making pairs that add up to eleven (suits are not important). Kings pair with queens of a non-matching suit, jacks with other jacks, and aces with tens.

== Variants ==
The game is popularly implemented as described with 10 tableau piles of five cards each, and Parlett's own instructions refer to "ten columns". However the image on Parlett's site depicts only five tableau piles of ten cards each, which is an alternative and much more difficult way to play.

== See also ==
- List of patience or solitaire games
- Glossary of patience or solitaire terms
