= British Constitution (card game) =

Patience or solitaire card game

British Constitution (usually Constitution in American sources) is an English patience or card solitaire played with two packs of playing cards. It is a card game with a high chance of winning.

== Rules ==
First, the kings, queens, and aces are removed from the stock. The kings and queens are discarded, while the aces are placed in a row to form the "Government" or the foundations, which are built up by suit to jacks.

Below the aces, four rows of eight cards each are dealt. This forms the tableau (also known as the "Constitution").

The cards available for building in the foundations should come from Row 1 (also known as the "Privy Council") only. Furthermore, cards in Row 1 can be built down by alternating colors. Available for building in Row 1 are the top cards of the piles in Row 1 (initially containing only one card per pile) and the cards from Row 2. Only one card can be moved at a time.

When a card leaves from either Row 1 or 2, the space it leaves behind must be filled with any card from the row immediately below it, not necessarily the one immediately below the space. The space, in essence, is pushed downwards until it reaches Row 4 (the "People Row"), where it is filled with a card from the stock. This is the only way cards from the stock enter the game. Furthermore, cards from the stock cannot be played directly to the foundations. If no more spaces appear in Row 4 with cards still undealt from the stock, the game is lost.

The game is won when all cards are built in the foundations up to jacks.

== Variants ==
Lady Cadogan's rule set specified that as the tableau is being set up, one Queen of Diamonds and the eight kings are put above the foundations; the Q♦ being "The Sovereign," the black Kings being the "Bishops," and the red Kings the "Judges," all placed above the foundation. The other Queens are discarded. Since these nine cards clearly play a purely decorative role in this game, most modern rule sets bypass this, which explains the reason the kings and queens are discarded completely as mentioned above.

Lady Cadogan's rule set also slightly differs from the rules set out by Mott-Smith and Morehead that is outlined above. In Lady Cadogan's rule set, while foundations are exclusively filled from cards from Row 1, Row 1 cards can only be built upon by cards from Row 2, not other cards from Row 1. This applies to the other rows, i.e. Row 2 cards are built by cards from Row 3, Row 3 cards by cards from Row 4, and Row 4 cards from a wastepile that is formed from unplayed cards from the stock. In other words, available for building on Rows 1 to 3 are cards from the row directly below while the top card on the wastepile is available to build on cards on Row 4.

== See also ==
- List of patiences and solitaires
- Glossary of patience and solitaire terms
