= Four Corners (patience) =

Four Corners, also known as Les Quatre Coins, Cornerstones, or Corner Patience, is a solitaire card game which is played with two decks of playing cards. It is so called because of the pile of four cards at the corners of the tableau.

The version discussed in this article is the more prevalent version printed in two books: Card Games for One by Peter Arnold and The Complete Book of Solitaire and Patience Games by Albert Morehead and Geoffrey Mott-Smith.

== Rules ==
The cards are dealt into two columns of six piles, all laid out with spaces intended for the foundations. The base cards on the top and bottom of the columns are turned sideways. These are the "cornerstones", the role of which will be discussed below. The cards are dealt under the restrictions to be explained below.

The object of the game is to find an Ace and a King of each suit as they appear and put them in the middle and build each of them by suit, building up on the Aces and down on the Kings.

The cards are dealt in rotations; while dealing, cards that can be would be built on the foundations are placed on the foundations under the following rules:

- When an ace or a king of each suit is placed on the foundations no matter where is put, but both the ace and the king of the same suit must be on the same line.
- A card that is about to be placed in a cornerstone can be built in any foundation.
- A card that is about to be placed in any other pile can only be built on the foundation which is in the same row as that pile.

Also, a pile should not skipped when dealing; when a pile is deprived of a card because it is built on the foundations, the next card should be placed on that pile.

There is no specific order of dealing in the 12 piles in Morehead and Mott-Smith's rule set, while Arnold's version states that the dealing should start at the top right cornerstone, dealing downward and ending at the bottom left cornerstone.

After the cards are all dealt, the restrictions are lifted. The top card of each pile can be built on any foundation. The cards on the cornerstones and the piles can also be built on each other up or down regardless of suit. Aces can be placed upon twos and kings. Both rule sets did not mention what to do with the spaces once a pile is emptied so it is presumed that they are not filled.

Reversals are also allowed, i. e. when the two foundations of the same suit meet, the cards can be transferred from one suit to another (with the exception of the ace and the king which start each foundation).

The game is considered won when all of the cards are played on the foundations.

== Variations ==
The rule set described by Arnold allows two redeals. To do this, the piles are picked up in the order they were dealt (especially the order set above) and the cards are then redealt without shuffling. At each redeal, the restrictions again apply until all cards are dealt.

== See also ==
- List of solitaires
- Glossary of solitaire
