= Algerian (card game) =

Playing card game

- A Patience game
- Origin: England
- Type: Non-builder
- Deck: Double 104-card
- Odds of winning: Odds against

Algerian or Algerian Patience is a unique and difficult patience or card solitaire using two decks of playing cards. The object of the game is to build 8 foundations down from King to Ace or up from Ace to King in suit.

== History ==
Algerian is first recorded by "Tarbart" in 1905; subsequent sources are few and far between, although Parlett includes it in his 1979 anthology.

== Rules ==
The following rules are based on "Tarbart" supplemented by Parlett where he differs:

Algerian has a tableau comprising a row of eight depots (positions for placing cards). In addition there is a reserve of six reserve piles of four cards each. Tarbart places them in two columns of three piles to the left and right of the tableau; Parlett is unspecific. Above the tableau row is another row of eight foundations.

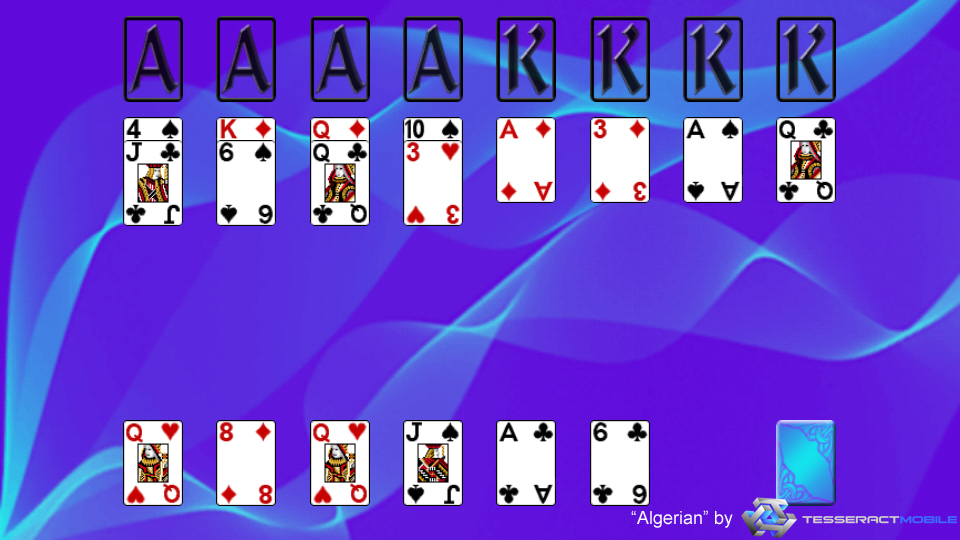
Algerian Layout

Only the topmost cards from the reserve and tableau piles are available for play. These "exposed cards" may be moved to the foundations or onto other depots in the tableau, but not to reserve piles. Cards may only be moved singly and not in sequences.

The first four foundations, i.e. those on the left, are founded with an Ace and built up in suit (e.g. A♥, 2♥, 3♥, 4♥...), while the four on the right start with a King and are built down in suit (e.g. K♣, Q♣, J♣, 10♣...). Tarbart lays out these 4 Aces and 4 Kings at the beginning; Parlett has them founded as they appear.

Cards may be built in ascending or descending suit sequence on the eight depots of the tableau (e.g. 4♦, 5♦, 6♦... OR 6♠, 5♠, 4♠...); the direction of the sequence may be reversed at any point e.g. if a 10♣ is played on a 9♣, and another 9♣ exposed, it may be played on the 10♣. Only the topmost card of any pile can be moved. Tableau piles can wrap from King to Ace, and a vacant depot can be filled with any exposed card. When the foundations of the same suit will meet (e.g. one builds up A♣, 2♣, 3♣, 4♣, 5♣, 6♣ and the other builds down K♣, Q♣, J♣, 10♣, 9♣, 8♣, 7♣), cards can be transferred between these two foundations.

When all desired plays have been made, two further cards are dealt from the stock onto each reserve pile and more plays may then be made if possible. This continues until eight cards remain in hand. On this final pass through the deck, one card is dealt to each depot.

Spaces in the tableau may be filled with any exposed card; spaces in the reserve pile may only be filled once the stock is exhausted. (Note: "Tarbart" says that some authorities do not permit this, which makes the Patience more difficult.) The reserve piles may not be built on at any stage.

The game is won after all cards have been moved to the foundations.

== Variants ==
Carthage is a variant of Algerian. Other closely related games include Tournament and its variants.

== See also ==
- List of patiences and solitaires
- Glossary of patience and solitaire terms

== Bibliography ==
- Parlett, David (1979). The Penguin Book of Patience, London: Penguin. ISBN 0-7139-1193-X
- "Tarbart" (1905). Games of Patience. 2nd edn. De La Rue.
