= Interregnum (card game) =

Interregnum is a patience or card solitaire game using two packs of 52 cards each. It sometimes also is given the name Constitution, although this alternate name can also refer to an entirely different game. The object of Interregnum is to build eight foundations of thirteen cards each, regardless of suit. Building the foundations is unusual compared to most foundation-building games.

== Rules ==
The game starts with eight cards dealt in a row. Each of these will be the last card placed onto its respective foundation, which is immediately below it, i.e. the foundation must start with a card which is a rank higher than the card above it and is built up from there. Building happens regardless of suit. (e.g. a 5 above a 4, a 2 above an A, an A above a K, etc.)

Below the foundations are eight tableau piles, each of which begins with one card. Only the top card of each pile is available for play, and these may only be moved to the foundations. When no more moves are possible, a card is dealt from the 88-card stock onto each pile, whether empty or having at least one card.

The game is over when the stock has been used up and there are no possible moves left. The game is won when all eight foundations have been built.

== See also ==
- List of solitaire games
- Glossary of solitaire terms
