= Precedence (card game) =

Card game

Precedence is a patience or card solitaire game which uses two packs of playing cards. It is a building game where the playing does not have to worry about a tableau or playing area.

== Names ==
Precedence goes by various other names including Order of Precedence, Panama and Downing Street. A variant is known as Legitimist.

== Rules ==
At the start of the game, a king is removed from the rest of the pack and placed on the first of eight foundations. Some rule sets state that as the cards are dealt, the first King that becomes available is placed on the first foundation.

After that, the following cards must be placed on the next seven foundations: a queen, a jack, a 10, a 9, an 8, a 7, and a 6. These cards should be placed on their respective foundations in this order and a foundation should not start until the foundation to its immediate left does. So the fourth foundation (which starts with a 10) for instance should not start unless the third one (which starts with a jack) is already in place. Also, when one foundation has already been started, it can immediately be built down regardless of suit until it has thirteen cards. (It is suggested that it should overlap to keep track on which card should end each foundation.) In this game, building is round-the-corner, i.e. a King can be placed over an ace, which can be placed over a deuce (or 2).

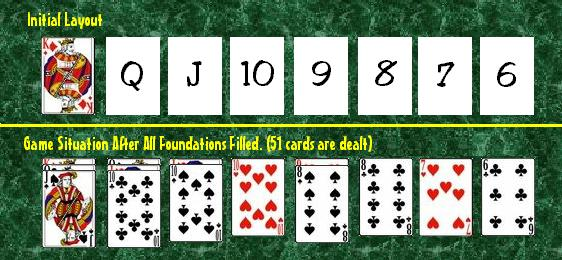
The game of Precedence. The top diagram is that of the initial layout, with the King of Diamonds placed. The bottom diagram shows the game in progress when all eight foundations are filled.

To play the game, the stock, which is composed of all the other cards, is dealt one card a time and can be built immediately on the foundations or placed on the waste pile, the top card of which is available for play. Once the stock has run out, the player can form a new stock by picking up the waste pile and turning it face down. The new stock is then dealt as normal. The player is allowed to do this only twice in the entire game.

The game ends when the stock has run out a third time. The game is out when all cards are built onto the foundations.

== See also ==
- List of patiences and card solitaires
- Glossary of patience and card solitaire terms

== Bibliography ==
- Parlett, David (1990). The Penguin Book of Patience. London, New York: Penguin.
