= Double Klondike =

Two-player card game

- A solitaire game
- Alternative names: Double Solitaire
- Family: Competitive
- Deck: Two 52-card decks (distinguishable)

Double Klondike is a two-player variant of the popular solitaire card game known as Klondike. It is most commonly referred to as Double Solitaire, but is also sometimes known as Double Klondike. (This name can also refer to the single-player solitaire game Gargantua.) Versions for more than two players — such as Triple Solitaire or Quadruple Solitaire — are also possible.

As the name suggests, Double Klondike is played by two players, each using a separate standard 52-card deck (Jokers removed). For optimal play, the cards in each deck should be distinguishable — either by using different back designs or by subtle differences in font or color on the card faces.

== How to play ==
Seated facing one another, each player sets up a standard Klondike layout using their own deck, with one key difference: the players share a communal foundation area located between their individual layouts. This shared foundation area consists of up to eight foundation piles—two for each suit, one from each deck.

Each player plays independently according to standard Klondike rules, with the variation that the three-card draw and unlimited-pass options apply equally to both players. Foundations are built up in suit and ascending order (Ace to King), as in Klondike, but any player may play on any foundation pile of the appropriate suit, regardless of who started the pile or whose cards are already present in it.

Because both players may contribute to the same foundation piles, speed can become a competitive factor. For example, if both players have a Two of Hearts available and one player is about to play the Ace of Hearts to begin a foundation, they must act quickly to add the Two before the other player does. As a result, foundation piles may contain a mixture of cards from both decks.

The game ends when both players have no legal moves remaining. At that point, the cards in the foundation piles are sorted according to their deck of origin, and each player counts how many of their own cards are present. The player with the most cards in the foundation area is declared the winner.

=== Competitive rules and etiquette ===
A number of informal rules are often agreed upon for competitive play:

1. Each player must hold their deck in one hand and use the other hand to make all moves. This prevents rapid placement of consecutive cards onto foundation piles without giving the other player a chance to react.
2. Cards must be placed on foundation piles one at a time; throwing or sliding multiple cards simultaneously is not allowed.
3. If two players attempt to place a card on the same foundation pile at the same time, the first card placed remains and the others must be retrieved by their respective players.
4. Players may not move partial tableau sequences. For example, a sequence such as red eight, black seven, red six may be moved onto a black nine, but the red six cannot be moved independently onto another black seven.

== Variations ==
Russian Bank, also known as Crapette, is a two-player card game that is a more complex and competitive derivative of Double Solitaire.

Commercial variants of Russian Bank have been produced by game manufacturers such as Mattel and Hasbro under the names Skip-Bo and Spite and Malice.

== See also ==
- Klondike
- Gargantua
- List of solitaires
- Glossary of solitaire
