= Sultan (card game) =

Patience or solitaire card game

Layout of Sultan Solitaire

Sultan, The Sultan or Sultan of Turkey is a patience or solitaire card game that uses two packs of playing cards. It is so named since a successful game rewards the player with a view of the Sultan (King of Hearts) surrounded by his harem of eight queens. This game is sometimes also called Emperor of Germany. Some skill is needed to achieve success.

== Rules ==
At the beginning of the game nine cards are laid out in the following arrangement:

K ♦	A ♥	K ♦
K ♠	K ♥	K ♠
K ♣	K ♥	K ♣

These cards make up the foundations and will be built up by suit in order. On the single foundation with an Ace, the A♥ foundation, the next cards will be 2♥, 3♥, and so on. On the seven kings, the order is Ace, 2, 3, etc., of the appropriate suits. Throughout the game, the only card which you cannot place other cards on is the K♥ (the Sultan) in the center location.

Six cards (or eight in some versions) from the deck are placed face-up around the foundations to make up the reserve, which in this game is sometimes referred to as the divan.

The player then makes one of three moves:

- Taking the top card from the face-down deck and placing it in the face-up waste pile.
- Taking the top card from the waste and adding it to one of the eight (outer) foundations.
- Moving a card from the reserve onto one of the eight (outer) foundations, and then replacing it with the next card from the deck.

The goal is to end the game with the Sultan (King of Hearts) surrounded by his Queens.

When there are no more cards in the face-down deck, the player may re-deal (shuffle the waste and place them face-down, creating a new deck), but may only do this twice per game. The game is over after the player has run through the deck three times, or when all the cards are on the foundations.

== See also ==
- List of solitaire games
- Glossary of solitaire terms
