= Colorado (card game) =

Solitaire card game

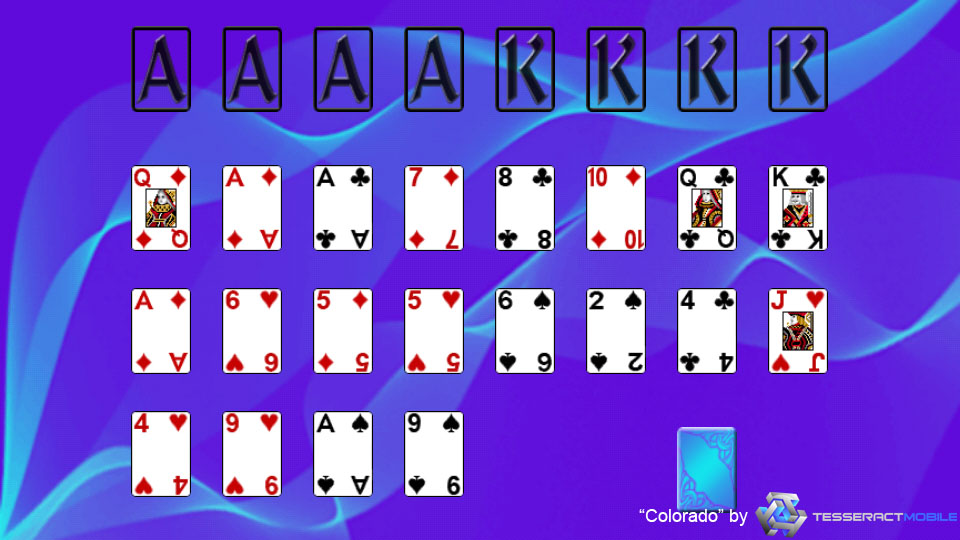
Screenshot of Colorado

Colorado is a solitaire card game which is played using two decks of playing cards. It is a game of card building which belongs to the same family as games like Sir Tommy, Strategy, and Calculation. It is considered an easy game with 80% odds of being completed successfully.

== Rules ==
First, twenty cards are dealt in any arrangement the player desires; it is suggested that cards should be two rows of ten cards each.

Then the player searches for an Ace and a King of each suit. These cards should go to the foundations whenever they become available for play. The foundations that start with the Aces are built up by suit, while those that start with Kings are built down by suit. The spaces that they left behind are immediately filled with cards from the stock.

The stock is then dealt one card at a time, and any card that cannot be built yet to the foundations is placed on one of the 20 cards which are in fact bases for waste piles. When placing cards onto a wastepile, they do not have to follow suit or rank. However, there is no building; when a card is placed on a waste pile, the only place it would go is to a foundation.

After each deal, the player will determine if any of the cards on the waste piles can be built onto the foundations.

Again, whenever a waste pile becomes empty, no matter how many cards it previously had, it is filled with a card from the wastepile. This is the only way an empty pile is refilled because when the stock runs out, spaces are no longer filled.

The game ends soon after the stock has run out. The game is won when all cards are built into the foundations; but when there are still cards that are stuck and cannot be possibly released, the game is lost.

Arranging reserves in up and down orders is key to good play.

== Variations ==
Closely related to Colorado are other two-deck games like Sly Fox, Twenty, Grandfather's Patience, and Grandmother's Patience. All of these have a tableau of 20 cards and are in the Sir Tommy family.

== See also ==
- Sir Tommy
- List of solitaires
- Glossary of solitaire
