= Soltrio Solitaire =

2007 video game

- Developer: Silver Creek Entertainment
- Publisher: Silver Creek Entertainment
- Platform: Xbox 360 (XBLA)
- Release: May 16, 2007
- Genre: Card game
- Modes: Single-player, multiplayer

Soltrio Solitaire is an Xbox Live Arcade title developed by Silver Creek Entertainment for the Xbox 360, which is a bundle of 18 separate solitaire card games, which was released on May 16, 2007.

== Gameplay ==
The game supports the Xbox Live Vision camera and has 2 player multiplayer over System Link or Xbox Live, including competitive solitaire in which two players use the same foundation piles, and co-operative solitaire, in which players assist one another and pass cards over.

The game features a light roleplaying mode called "Voyage Adventure" in which the player traverses a game map to play solitaire games, which includes the ability to unlock new card elements and design customizable deck graphics.

The game featured downloadable content in the form of solitaire card game packs every two weeks until October 3, 2007, using games found in Silver Creek's Hardwood Solitaire title for Microsoft Windows and Mac OS.

== Critical reception ==
IGN rated Soltrio as "mediocre". Some game modes, such as Memory, were criticized for being "padding". The quest mode was seen as worthless and the multiplayer Klondike-variation was deemed "sloppy and no fun". Although the competitive mode could be "spirited and fun", overall the package was described as unjustifiably expensive.

== Games ==
The full list of the initial group of 18 solitaire card games include:

- Aces Up
- Archway
- Backbone
- Easthaven
- Forty Thieves
- FreeCell Easy
- FreeCell
- Grandfather's Clock
- Klondike Deal 3
- Klondike Easy
- Matrimony
- Memory
- Montana
- Sea Towers
- Spider 1 Suit
- Super Flower Garden
- Zodiac

== Additional Content ==
=== Game Pack 1 ===
On June 13, 2007, "Game Pack 1" added the following 10 games:

- Clock
- Compass Easy
- Compass
- Lady of the Manor
- Miss Milligan
- Russian Solitaire
- Sir Tommy
- Storehouse
- Whitehead
- Yin & Yang

=== Game Pack 2 ===
On June 27, 2007, "Game Pack 2" added 10 more games:

- Bristol
- Down Under
- Easthaven 2 Deck
- Easthaven 3 Deck
- Giant
- Golf Easy
- Golf
- Little Milligan
- Pauline
- Westcliff

=== Game Pack 3 ===
On July 11, 2007, "Game Pack 3" added 10 more games:

- Ayers Rock
- Beleaguered Castle
- Betrothal
- Blind Alleys Hard
- Blind Alleys
- Grand Duchess
- Grandfather
- Indian
- Josephine
- Number Ten

=== Game Pack 4 ===
On July 25, 2007, "Game Pack 4" added 10 more games:

- Black Hole
- Can-Can
- Cruel
- Demon
- Forty Thieves Open
- Four Seasons Easy
- Four Seasons
- King Albert
- L'Imperiale
- La Belle Lucie

=== Game Pack 5 ===
On August 8, 2007, "Game Pack 5" added 10 more games:

- Little Giant
- Lucas
- Maria
- Pas Seul
- Quilt
- Steps
- Streets
- Sultan
- Trefoil
- Twenty

=== Game Pack 6 ===
On August 23, 2007, "Game Pack 6" added 9 more games:

- Eight Off
- ForeCell
- Four Colors
- FreeCell 2 Deck
- FreeCell 3 Deck Easy
- FreeCell 3 Deck
- Maxel's Gambit
- Monte Carlo
- Penguin

=== Game Pack 7 ===
On September 5, 2007, "Game Pack 7" added 10 more games:

- Canfield Easy
- Canfield
- Klondike 2 Deck Easy
- Klondike 2 Deck
- Klondike 3 Deck
- Superior Canfield
- Xray Klondike
- Yukon - Rigel's
- Yukon - Two Decks
- Yukon

=== Game Pack 8 ===
On September 19, 2007, "Game Pack 8" added 10 more games:

- Funnel Web
- Plait
- Rank and File
- Scorpion Easy
- Scorpion
- Scorpio
- Spider 2 Suits
- Spider 4 Suits
- Spike
- Thumb & Pouch

=== Game Pack 9 ===
On October 3, 2007, "Game Pack 9" added 10 more games:

- Block Ten
- Fourteen Out
- Nestor
- Pyramid Deal Three
- Pyramid Easy
- Pyramid Golf
- Pyramid Seven
- Pyramid
- Simple Pairs
- Tens

== See also ==
- Xbox Live Arcade
- Xbox Live Vision
