= Super Solitaire =

1994 video game

- North American cover art
- Developer: Beam Software
- Publishers: NA: Extreme Entertainment Group; JP: Pack-In-Video
- Composer: Marshall Parker
- Platform: Super NES
- Release: NA: January 1994; JP: July 23, 1995
- Genre: Board game
- Mode: Single-player

Super Solitaire (Note: Released in Japan as Trump Island (Japanese: トランプアイランド, Hepburn: Toranpu Airando)) is a Super Nintendo Entertainment System video game that has different variations version of the classic solitaire card game.

== Summary ==
The variations of solitaire in the game include: Klondike, FreeCell, Golf, Cruel, Pyramid, Stonewall, Dozen't Matter, Aces Up, Florentine, Poker, Canfield and Scorpion. Classic artwork for each game's background is included along with optional graphics that look like something out of a cartoon. Soft music is included with each and every game variation.

Players can even choose to get hints or even skip to the next card through a special options screen.

== Reception ==
On release, Famicom Tsūshin scored the game a 21 out of 40. GamePro praised the variety of games, the graphics, the music, and the ability to change the backgrounds, though they emphasized that the game would bore most children. Allgame would assign this video game a rating of 2.5 starts out of a possible 5.
