= Australian Patience =

Card game

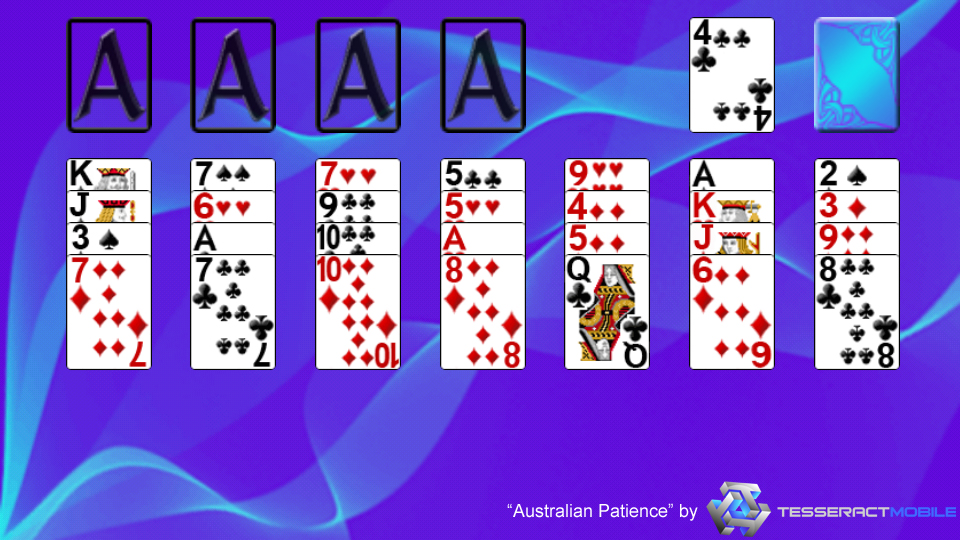
Screenshot of Australian Patience

Australian Patience is a patience or card solitaire using one deck of playing cards. This game is a combination of Klondike and Scorpion, and is also closely related to Yukon. The object of the game is to move all of the cards to the Foundations.

== Rules ==
Australian Patience has four Foundations build up in suit from Ace to King, e.g. A♣, 2♣, 3♣, 4♣...

The seven depots of the Tableau are filled with piles of four cards each, which build down in suit, e.g. 8♥, 7♥, 6♥, 5♥...

Like Yukon, any face-up card can be moved, but all the unrelated cards on top of it will be moved also. Only a King (with or without a pile) can be moved to an empty space.

Only one card is turned up at a time from the Deck, and these cards can be played onto the depots or the Foundations. Australian Patience only allows one pass through the deck.

== Variations ==
Due to dependence on luck of the draw, only about 20% of games can be won. Several variations increase the chances of completing the game successfully by introducing rules to allow a single redeal of the stock (Canberra), unlimited redeals (Tasmanian Solitaire), or a different starting tableau (Brisbane).

Australian Patience can be played as a race game for two players.

== See also ==
- Yukon
- List of patiences and solitaires
- Glossary of patience and solitaire terms
