= St. Helena (card game) =

Card game

St. Helena (also known as Napoleon's Favourite or Washington's Favorite) is a patience or card solitaire game using two decks of playing cards shuffled together. Despite its name, it has no connection to the island with the same name, nor should it be confused with the better known Napoleon at St Helena, also called Forty Thieves in the US.

== Rules ==
Explained here is the prevalent version. First, one king and one ace of each suit are removed and place in the middle of the table in two rows as shown. They are called the bases for the foundations. The kings form the upper foundations, while the aces form the lower foundations. Then, the rest of the cards are dealt clockwise into twelve piles starting with the upper left king. The table should now look like this:

	1	2	3	4	
12	K	K	K	K	5
11	A	A	A	A	6
	10	9	8	7	

The object is to build the upper foundations down by suit to the aces, and the lower foundations up by suit.

The top card of each pile surrounding the foundations is available for play onto another pile or on the foundations. Building on the piles is either up or down by suit. However a king cannot be placed over an ace and an ace cannot be placed over a king. Only one card can be moved at a time.

There is no mention in The Complete Book of Solitaire and Patience Games of what to do with the spaces. This gives rise to at least two rule sets: one allows any card to be placed in a space; and another that does not allow a space to be filled.

For the first deal, there are restrictions as to which card goes to which foundation. Cards on piles 1 to 4 can only be played only to the upper foundations, cards on piles 7 to 10 can only be played to the lower foundations, and cards on piles 5, 6, 11, and 12 are available to either the upper or lower foundations.

After all possible moves have been made, the piles are collected in reverse order. That is, Pile 12 is placed over the Pile 11, then both are placed over Pile 10, and so on until all piles are placed over Pile 1. Then, without reshuffling, they are redealt again, one by one, into twelve piles around the foundations. After the cards are dealt anew, the restrictions no longer apply, i.e. a card can be placed on any foundation. This goes for after the second redeal.

The game is won when all cards are built into the foundations.

== Variants ==
Louis is a solitaire variant of St. Helena. It is played exactly as St. Helena except for the following modifications:

- First, 12 cards are dealt, one on each pile. From these twelve, the player places playable cards onto the foundations, filling a gap every time a card is played. If the game stops for lack of a play, the rest of the deck is dealt onto the twelve piles.
- All top cards of piles are available to be built in any foundation (no restrictions).
- Building in the piles can be up or down, but always by suit.

Box Kite is another variant, which is played the same as St. Helena, except that there are no restrictions about playing to the foundations after the initial deal, but no redeals are allowed.

== See also ==
- Box Kite
- List of solitaire games
- Glossary of solitaire terms
