= Fortune's Favor =

Card game

- A Patience game
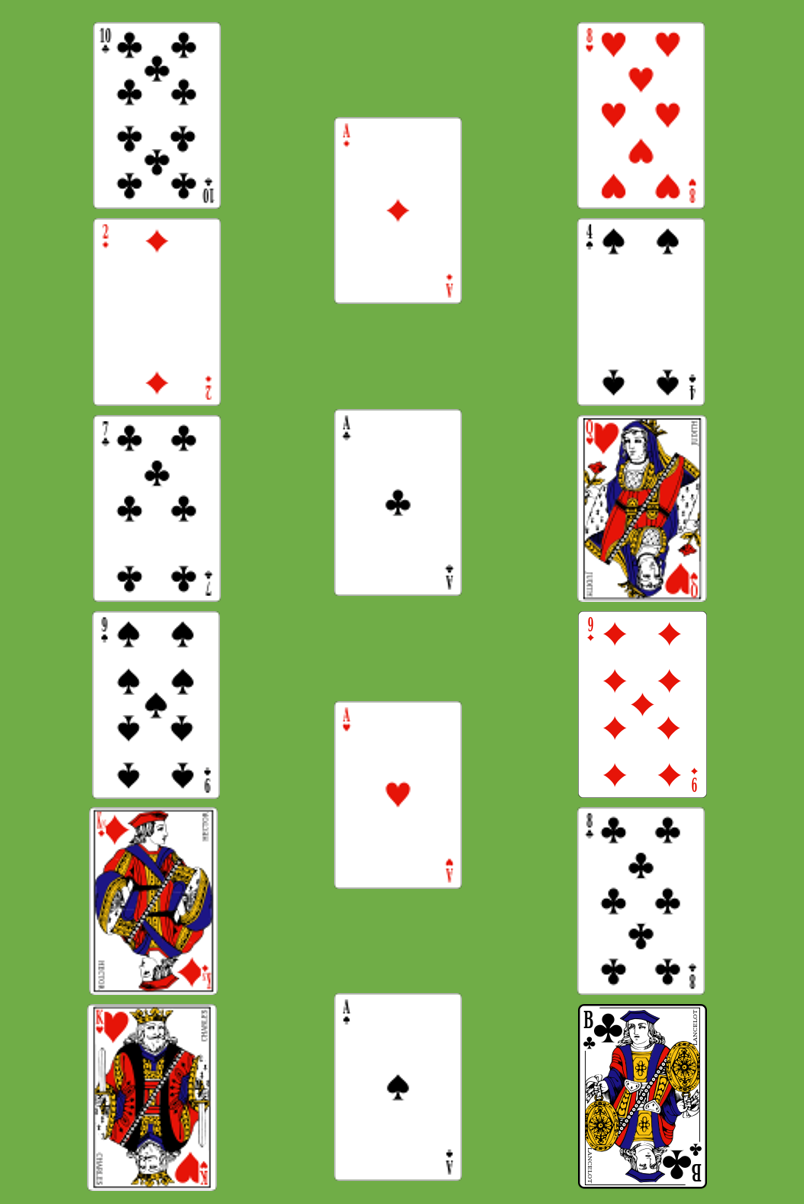
- Original vertical layout
- Alternative names: Fortune's Favour
- Type: Simple packer
- Deck: Single 52-card
- Playing time: 5 min
- Odds of winning: 9 in 10

Fortune's Favor or Fortune's Favour is a patience or solitaire card game which is played with a deck of 52 playing cards. It is so-called probably because the chances of winning are completely on the player's side. It is a significantly simplified version of the game Busy Aces, a member of the Forty Thieves family of solitaire games.

== History ==
The rules were first published in England by Professor Hoffmann in 1892 under the name The Four Seasons, a name subsequently assumed by another game with a different layout and packing scheme. He used a vertical layout with the foundations in the centre column. In 1898, Dick included it in his American compendium under the name Fortune's Favors and the name stuck, albeit with minor spelling variations. For example, American authors, Morehead and Mott-Smith call it Fortune's Favour, as does David Parlett, while Coops and Moyse call it Fortune's Favor. Parlett notes its original name of Four Seasons as an alternative. Morehead and Mott-Smith introduced a horizontal layout with the foundations as the top row.

== Rules ==
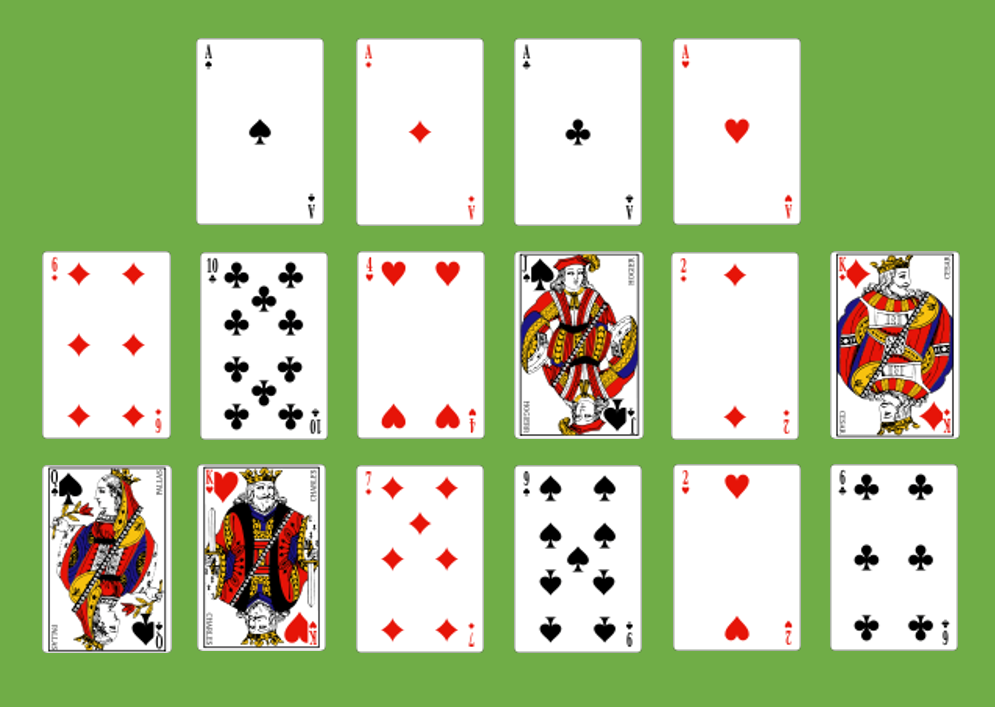
Alternative horizontal layout

First, the four aces are removed from the deck and placed in a row to form the bases of the foundations. These foundations are built up by suit to kings.

Below the foundations, two rows of six cards each (or any preferred arrangement of twelve cards) are dealt. These form the bases of the twelve tableau piles. The top cards on the tableau piles are available for building on the foundations and on the tableau. Building in the tableau is down by suit and spaces which result in moving a card are filled from the wastepile or, if there is none, the stock. Only one card can be moved at a time.

The stock, when play comes to a standstill, is dealt one card at a time onto a wastepile, the top card of which is available for play on the tableau or foundations.

The game is won when all cards are built onto the foundations.

== See also ==
- Forty Thieves
- List of patiences and solitaires
- Glossary of patience and solitaire terms

== Bibliography ==
- Coops, Helen Leslie (1939). 100 Games of Solitaire. Whitman. 128 pp. Definitive [US] pre-war collection.
- Dick, Harris B. (1898). Dick's Games of Patience; or, Solitaire with Cards. 2nd Series. 113 pp. 70 games. NY: Dick & Fitzgerald.
- Morehead, A. H. & G. Mott-Smith (1949). The Complete Book of Solitaire and Patience Games. NY: Longmans
- Moyse, Alphonse Jr. (1950). 150 Ways to Play Solitaire. Cincinnati: USPCC. 128 pp. “A pretty decent book” IA
- Parlett, David (1979). The Penguin Book of Patience, London: Penguin. ISBN 0-7139-1193-X
- Professor Hoffmann [Angelo Lewis] (1892). The Illustrated Book of Patience Games. London: Routledge.
