= Diplomat (disambiguation) =

A diplomat is a person who conducts diplomacy with other states or international organizations.

Diplomat or The Diplomat(s) may refer to:

== Arts and entertainment ==
=== Film ===
- The Diplomat (2000 film), a documentary about José Ramos-Horta
- Diplomat (film), a 2012 Ethiopian spy thriller
- The Diplomat (2015 film), a documentary about Richard Holbrooke
- The Diplomat (2025 film), an Indian political thriller
- The Diplomats (film), a lost 1929 film

=== Literature ===
- The Diplomat (magazine), about the Indo-Pacific, founded 2001
- The Diplomat (novel), by James Aldridge, 1949
- The Washington Diplomat, a monthly newspaper since 2004

=== Music ===
- The Diplomats, or Dipset, an American hip-hop group
  - Diplomat Records, a record label run by the hip-hop group
- "The Diplomat", a song by Editors from a version of the 2005 album The Back Room
- The Diplomats, a 1970s English rock band led by Denny Laine

=== Television ===
- The Diplomat (mini-series), a 2009 Australian mini-series
- The Diplomat (British TV series), a 2023 BBC series set in Barcelona
- The Diplomat (American TV series), a 2023 Netflix series set in London

== Sports ==
- Central Texas Diplomats, an American basketball team
- Washington Diplomats, an American soccer team (1974–1981)
  - Washington Diplomats (1988–1990)

== Transportation ==
- Diplomat (train), a Baltimore and Ohio Railroad passenger train (1930s–1950s)
- DeSoto Diplomat, an automobile (made 1946–1962)
- Dodge Diplomat, a mid-size car (made 1977–1989)
- Opel Diplomat, a luxury car (made 1964–1977)

== Other uses ==
- Diplomat (card game), a two-deck solitaire game
- Diplomat Hotel, Baguio, Philippines
- Diplomat Pharmacy, an American specialised pharmaceutical business (1975–2019)
- Operation Diplomat, an WWII Allied naval training operation

== See also ==
- Diplomacy
- Diplomat pudding, a dessert
