= Seahaven Towers =

- A Patience game
- Alternative names: Sea Towers, Tours du Alice
- Family: FreeCell
- Deck: Single 52-card

Seahaven Towers is a patience or solitaire card game that uses a deck of 52 playing cards, and is closely related to the popular solitaire game FreeCell. Good players can expect to win more than three-quarters of their games by clever card manipulation.

== Rules ==
Game play is very similar to FreeCell, except that the tableau is built down in suit, and only a king or a sequence starting with a king may be placed on empty tableau spots (although they can simplify the rule and put any card or sequence in an empty tableau spot).

There are ten tableau columns instead of eight. In the initial deal five cards are dealt face-up to each column, leaving two cards in hand dealt to the two FreeCells (usually the center but can be in any pattern).

The suit restriction makes the game more difficult than FreeCell. This is counterbalanced by there being more columns of fewer cards.

== History ==
An Apple Macintosh version of Seahaven Towers was released in 1988 by Art Cabral, which helped popularize the game under that name, but Art himself insisted that he did not invent its rules.

A Seahaven Towers card game was provided with the Silicon Graphics, Inc. IRIX operating system, and included an automated solver that could determine whether a particular game could be solved.

== See also ==
- FreeCell
- List of solitaire games
- Glossary of solitaire terms
