= Blockade (card game) =

Solitaire two-pack card game

- A Patience game
- Family: Spider
- Deck: Double 52-card

Blockade is a patience or card solitaire game that uses two packs of 52 playing cards each. As in most patiences, the object is to play the cards into foundations. The play is reminiscent of the popular game, Forty Thieves, but with 12 piles instead of 10.

== Rules ==
The game starts with twelve piles, each containing a card; the rest form the stock. Cards are built down in suit (e.g., 7-6-5-4) and cards or groups of cards can be moved from one pile to another or to the foundations. The foundations are built up also in suit, starting from the ace. An empty pile will be filled up immediately by a card from the stock.

When all possible moves are done without success, a card is dealt onto each pile, even with those that have sequences. This and the placing of cards on empty piles is done until the stock runs out. After that, any card or group of cards can be placed on any empty space.

The patience is out when all 104 cards are successfully moved to the foundations.

== See also ==
- List of patiences and solitaires
- Glossary of patience and solitaire terms
