= Box Kite (card game) =

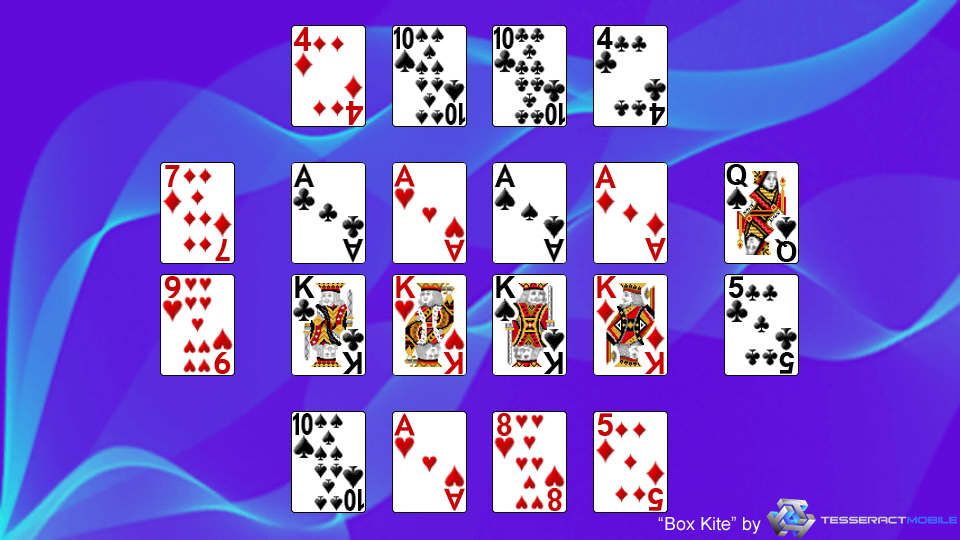
Screenshot of Box Kite

Box Kite is a moderately difficult patience or card solitaire using two packs. The object of the game is to move all of the cards to the foundations. It is a variant of the old game of St. Helena.

== Rules ==
Box Kite has eight foundations located in the middle of the tableau. The 8 foundation piles are divided into two groups. There are four piles located on the top that start with a King, and build down in suit. e.g. K♥, Q♥, J♥, 10♥...

The other four piles start with an Ace and build up in suit, e.g. A♠, 2♠, 3♠, 4♠...

Surrounding the foundations are twelve tableau piles holding eight cards each. These can be built up or down regardless of suit, but only the top card of each pile can be moved, e.g. 10♥, J♣, 10♠, 9♦, 8♦...

Cards can be relocated between the top and bottom foundations. There are no redeals in Box Kite. The game is out when all cards have been moved to the foundations.

== Variants ==
Box Kite is a variant of St. Helena (Napoleon's Favorite), which adds restrictions about playing to the foundations, but adds two redeals in order to compensate for the increased difficulty that this creates.

== See also ==
- St. Helena
- List of patiences and card solitaires
- Glossary of patience and solitaire terms
