= Baker's Game =

Patience or solitaire card game

- A Patience game
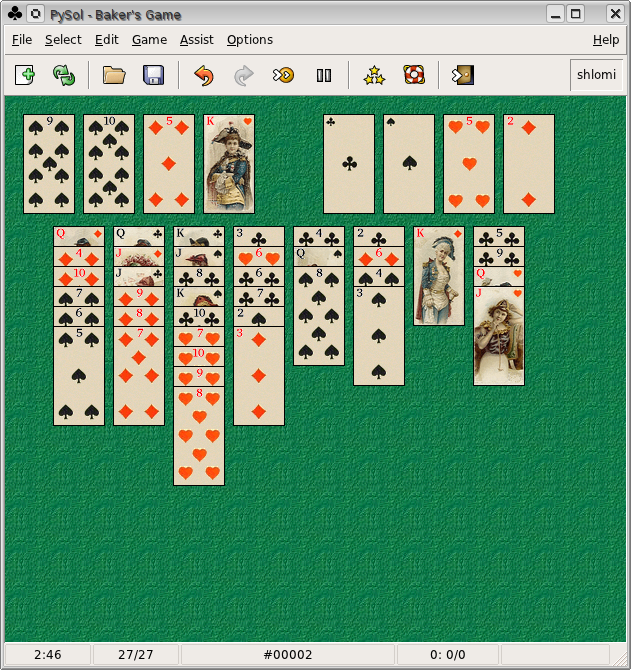
- A partially completed game of Baker's Game on PySolFC
- Alternative names: Brain Jam
- Named variants: FreeCell
- Type: Open packer
- Family: Freecell
- Deck: Single 52-card

Baker's Game is a patience or solitaire card game similar to FreeCell. It predates FreeCell, and differs from it only in the fact that sequences are built by suit, instead of by alternate color. This makes the game more difficult to complete successfully.

== History ==
One of the oldest ancestors of Baker's Game is Eight Off. In the June 1968 edition of Scientific American, Martin Gardner described in his "Mathematical Games" column a game by C. L. Baker, that is now known as Baker's Game. Gardner wrote "The game was taught to Baker by his father, who in turn learned it from an Englishman during the 1920s".

The description of Baker's Game in the "Mathematical Games" column inspired Paul Alfille to create FreeCell and he coded it for the PLATO educational computer system, which ended up becoming more popular than Baker's Game.

== Rules ==
(Adapted from the FreeCell's article Rules.)

Construction and layout:

- One standard 52-card deck is used.
- There are four open cells and four open foundations. (Some alternate rules use between one and ten cells.)
- The entire deck is dealt out left to right into eight cascades, four of which comprise seven cards and four of which comprise six. (Some alternate rules will use between four and ten cascades.)

Building during play:

- The top card of each cascade begins a tableau.
- Tableau must be built down by the same suit.
- Foundations are built up by suit.

Moves:

- Any cell card or top card of any cascade may be moved to build on a tableau, or moved to an empty cell, an empty cascade, or its foundation (to make the game harder, only put kings on an empty cascade spot).
- Complete or partial tableaus may be moved to build on existing tableaus, or moved to empty cascades, by recursively placing and removing cards through intermediate locations. While computer implementations often show this motion, players using physical decks typically move the tableau at once.

Victory:

- The game is won after all cards are moved in ascending number by suit to their foundation piles.

Variant: To make the game even more difficult, allow only kings to be placed on an empty tableau spot.

== Statistics ==
Freecell Solver, a solver for some variants of Patience game, including Baker's Game, was run on the first 10 million deals of Baker's Game with 4 reserve cells based on the Microsoft FreeCell deals, in order to collect statistics. The solver was run using a preset that guarantees an accurate verdict. Out of the 10 million deals, 7,431,962 were solvable (making for an average win rate of 74.3%), and the average number of moves required to solve was 107.5 moves (unoptimized).

== See also ==
- FreeCell
- Eight Off
- List of patiences and solitaires
- Glossary of patience and solitaire terms
