= Perseverance (solitaire) =

Solo card game

- A Patience game
- Family: Bisley
- Deck: Single 52-card

Perseverance is a solitaire card game played with a deck of 52 playing cards. The reason for the name is not known, but likely originates in the fact that perseverance is necessary to succeed.

== Rules ==
First, the four aces are taken out of the deck. These form the four foundations.

Then the rest are shuffled and dealt into twelve piles of four cards each. One can distribute one card at a time for each pile or deal four cards at a time to form a pile.

The top cards of each pile are available for play to the foundations or on the tableau piles. The foundations are built up by suit, with the cards on the tableau are built down, also by suit.

One card can be moved at a time. However, the player is allowed to move a sequence of cards as a unit to another pile with an appropriate card (e.g. 6-5-4-3♠ can be placed on the 7♠).

When all possible moves are made (or the player has done all the possible moves one can make), the piles are picked up in reverse order. For example, the twelfth pile is placed over the eleventh pile, and this new pile is placed on the tenth pile, and so on. Then, without shuffling, the cards are dealt to as many piles of four as the remaining cards will allow. To ensure that the order of the cards is not disturbed for the most part, it is suggested that the cards are dealt four at time. This can be done only twice.

The game is won when all cards are built onto the foundations up to Kings.

== Variations ==
Cruel is a popular solitaire game based on Perseverance. Perseverance is also closely related to Bisley.

== Other sources ==
- Coops, Helen L. 100 Games of Solitaire
- Bonaventure, George A. Two-Pack Games of Solitaire
- Dick, William Brisbane. Dick's Games of Patience
- Moyse Jr, Alphonse. 150 Ways to play Solitaire

== See also ==
- Cruel
- Bisley
- List of solitaire games
- Glossary of solitaire terms
