= Corona (card game) =

Type of solitaire game

Corona is a relatively long and difficult patience or card solitaire using two decks. The object of the game is to move all of the cards to the foundations. Successfully winning the game is considered difficult.

Play is much like that in the popular family of games based on Napoleon at St Helena, but with a tableau of 12 piles instead of 10. Corona is nearly identical to the variant of Limited, with the exception of an additional restriction that the deck is used to refill empty piles rather than letting the player fill them as desired.

== Rules ==
=== Layout ===
Corona has eight foundations that build up in suit from Ace to King, e.g. Ace♥, 2♥, 3♥, 4♥...

There are twelve tableau piles that build down in suit, e.g. 10♦, 9♦, 8♦, 7♦...

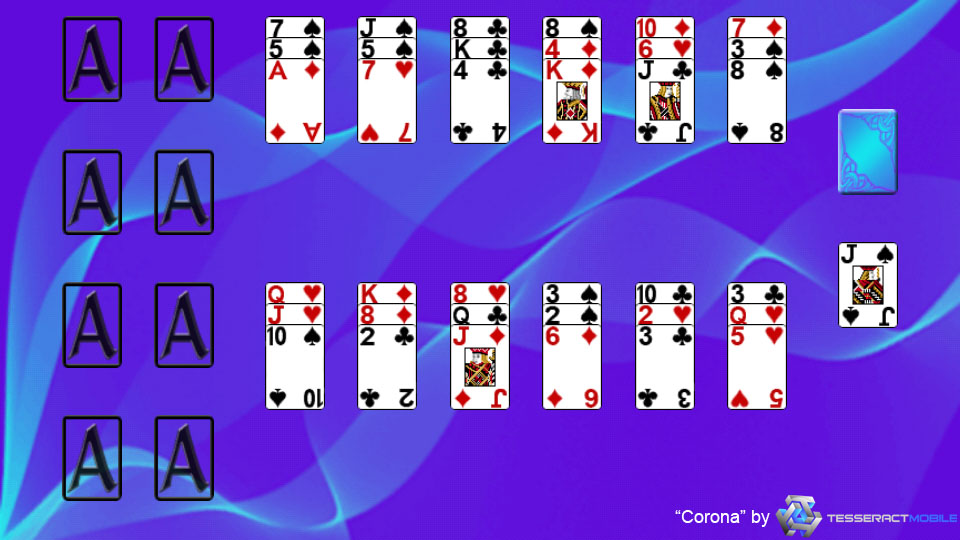
Corona Layout

=== Play ===
Only one card can be moved at a time, and this is the top card on each tableau pile or the single card being dealt from the stock. These cards can be played on the foundations or onto other tableau piles.

The stock is dealt one card at a time, and automatically fills empty spaces in the tableau piles. Only one pass through the deck is allowed.

The game is out once all cards have been moved to the foundations.

== See also ==
- List of patiences and solitaires
- Glossary of patience and solitaire terms
