= Flower garden (disambiguation) =

A flower garden is a garden where flowers are grown for decorative purposes.

Flower garden may also refer to:

- Flower Garden (solitaire)
- Flower Garden Banks National Marine Sanctuary
- "Flower Garden" by GFriend from the EP Time for the Moon Night

== See also ==
- Poola Rangadu (disambiguation)
