= Penguin (solitaire) =

Solitaire card game

- A Patience game
- Family: Freecell
- Deck: Single 52-card

Penguin is a patience or solitaire card game, invented by David Parlett, which uses a deck of 52 playing cards. The game play is similar to solitaire card games like the popular Freecell and its predecessor Eight Off.

== Rules ==
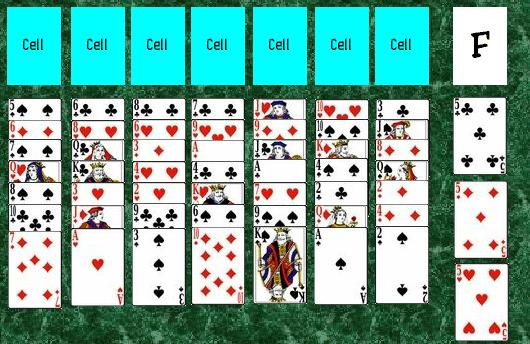
The initial layout of a game of Penguin.

The cards are dealt from left to right into seven columns, each with seven rows. The first card dealt is called the "beak" (in the example, the five of spades). When the three other cards with the same rank appear, they are immediately placed on the foundations, and the next card dealt takes its place in the tableau so that no empty spaces appear.

The object of the game is to build the foundations up in suit up to the card that is a rank lower than the beak. For example, if the beak is a five, the last card of each foundation should be a four; if it is an ace, the last card of each foundation should be a king.

The cards on the tableau are built down by suit. Cards are moved one at a time, unless a suit sequence of cards is formed, which can be moved as a unit. Unlike Freecell, the movement of such a sequence is independent of the number of free cells for all the cards in the sequence; an eight-card sequence can still be moved. When an empty column occurs in the tableau, only a card of the rank directly beneath the beak or a suit sequence starting with that rank maybe placed on it. (For example, if the beak is an ace, only a king or a suit sequence starting with a king may be used.)

There are seven cells, one above (or below as desired) each of the seven columns, which can be used to store a single card to be played later. These seven cells are collectively called the "flipper".

The game is won when all cards are built onto the foundations. The game has a high probability of being won. In a computer analysis of 50,000,000 deals, Mark Masten found that 99.94% of games were winnable with correct play. One good strategy is to first work towards freeing the beak.

== See also ==
- Freecell
- Eight Off
- List of solitaire games
- Glossary of solitaire terms
