= Congress (card game) =

Solitaire card game

Congress is a patience or solitaire card game using two decks of 52 playing cards each. It is a simple but strategic game which requires skill and careful choosing for it to be completed successfully. It is closely related to Forty Thieves but has eight instead of ten columns. It is sometimes called President's Cabinet, and can typically be completed successfully less than once in 20 games.

== Rules ==
Two columns of four cards each are dealt. In between these two columns are columns that serve as foundations. Once an ace is available, it is placed on one of these foundations and it is built up by suit to Kings.

The cards on the two columns to the left and right of the foundations are available for play and a card can built onto a foundation or to another card on the tableau (the two columns). Building on the tableau is down regardless of suit and any space is filled either by the top card of the stock or the top card of the wastepile. Cards are moved only one at a time.

When play is no longer possible on the tableau, the stock is dealt one at a time onto the waste pile, the top card of which is available for play. It can only be dealt once.

The game is out if all cards are placed onto the foundations.

== Variations ==
Parliament is an easier variant of Congress where the Aces begin on the foundations. Also closely related is Diplomat.

== See also ==
- Forty Thieves
- List of patiences and solitaires
- Glossary of patience and solitaire terms
