= Agnes (card game) =

- A Patience game
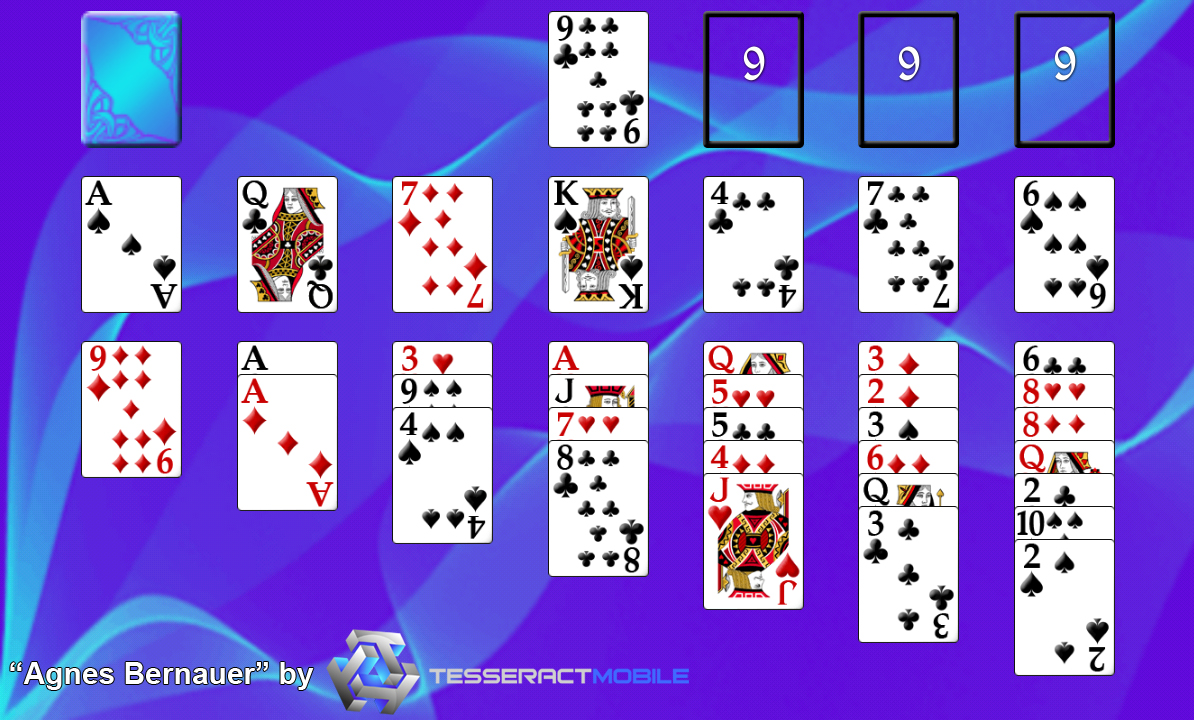
- The Agnes Bernauer layout
- Named variants: Agnes Sorel, Agnes Bernauer
- Type: Half-open packer
- Deck: Single 52-card
- Odds of winning: 1 in 6 (Agnes Sorel) (Note: According to Dalton, to get it out 1 in 6 or 7 times requires a good deal of skill.); 1 in 3 (Agnes Bernauer)

Agnes is a patience or solitaire card game that emerged in England about the same time as Klondike appeared in the US. The classic version has the unusual feature of packing in colour, a feature it shares with Whitehead. By contrast, the later American variant appears to have been influenced by Klondike with packing is in alternate colours. The classic game has been described as the best single-pack patience yet invented.

== History ==
The earliest account is given by Dalton in The Strand Magazine in 1909, who described "The Agnes" as "by far the best and most interesting one-pack Patience which has yet been invented." He believed that its rules had not been published before, even by Miss Whitmore Jones, the most prolific patience writer of that time. For him a distinguishing feature was that cards were packed in the same colour, not alternating colours as is usual.

Despite Dalton's endorsement, the game does not appear regularly in the compendia until after the Second World War. However, during the 1930s and 1940s, a new variant appeared, (Note: The earliest may be the account in Coops (1939).) possibly influenced by the rise of Klondike which it resembles much more closely than the original game. This introduced a reserve row of cards and packing was in the usual alternating colour sequence.

In 1979 David Parlett gave 'surnames' to the two main variants of Agnes to distinguish between them. Both variants continue to be published.

== Rules ==
=== Classic rules or Agnes Sorel ===
These are Dalton's 1909 original rules, which are still followed. (Note: For example, see Bonaventure (1961), Magna (1993) and Hamlyn (2014).) Parlett calls this variant Agnes Sorel, after the mistress of Charles VII of France, whose image is believed to be that of Rachel on traditional French pattern card packs. The game's distinguishing features are that the tableau is packed in colour and there is no reserve.

After shuffling, twenty-eight cards are dealt, face up, in seven rows and aligned left. (Note: Parlett has the columns overlapping, but the original rules show the cards in separate rows.) The first row has seven cards, the second six cards and so on. The tableau thus forms a right-angled triangle. The twenty-ninth card is turned up and placed above the tableau as the first "master card" (foundation card). The remaining three master cards are those of the same rank as the first and are placed in a row to its right when they become available.

The aim is to build on the master cards in suit and ascending sequence, turning the corner with the Aces if necessary. The lowest card in each column is "exposed" i.e. available to be moved to a foundation pile or onto the bottom card of the same colour in another column and in descending sequence. Two or more cards may be moved from one column to another as a packet if they are of the same suit as well as the same colour. (Note: Parlett insists that suit sequences must be moved in entirety.) So the ♠8 can be moved onto the ♣9, but they cannot be moved on together. In addition, any exposed card can be moved into a vacancy in the tableau, but such spaces need not be occupied. (Note: Parlett has the stricter rule that vacancies may only be filled by a redeal.)

When no more moves are possible on the initial layout, seven more cards are dealt to the bottom of the seven columns, after which any further moves may be carried out. Once all desired moves have been made, another seven cards are dealt to the columns and so on until the pack is exhausted. After the third deal, there will be two cards left in hand which may be looked at before the third deal is played. When all moves have been made, they are dealt to the first two columns. (Note: This is Parlett's interpretation. Dalton just says they may be looked at.) Only one deal is permitted and if any cards remain in the tableau, the patience has failed.

=== Klondike-like variant or Agnes Bernauer ===
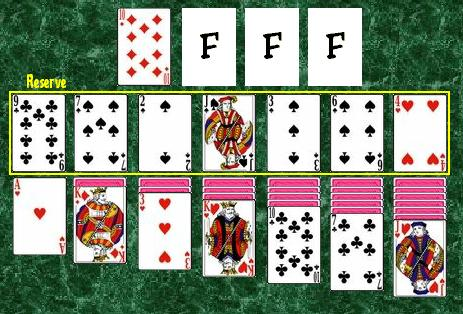
Initial layout of the game of Agnes

Morehead (1949) describes a new version of Agnes that has been influenced by the rules of Klondike. Parlett dubs this variant Agnes Bernauer after the wife and mistress of Duke Albert III of Bavaria, whose father was unhappy with their relationship, and had Agnes drowned in the Danube River. (Note: Moyse's claim that Agnes is "one of many variations of Klondike designed to increase the chances of winning." can clearly only apply to this later variant.)

The key differences from Agnes Sorel are that cards are packed in alternating colours on the tableau and a reserve of seven cards is dealt below the first seven rows.

In this version the tableau is dealt from left to right as before, but aligned right as in Klondike. The reserve is dealt below the tableau after laying the first base card. (Note: The illustration has the reserve above the tableau; Morehead specifies that it should be below.) Tableau cards may be packed or built as before, and cards from the reserve may be packed onto the tableau or foundations. (Note: In Parlett's version, reserve cards may only be moved to the tableau and only tableau cards may be built on the foundations.) A tableau vacancy may only be filled by a card of the next lower rank as the base. In Morehead, packed sequences must be moved in entirety; Parlett mentions an alternative laxer rule, whereby a portion of a sequence may be moved if desired.

When no further moves are possible, seven more cards are dealt to the seven reserve depots, covering any existing reserve cards, which only become available again once the card or cards above have been played. After three deals, the last two cards are turned up and both are available. The game is won when all cards have made their way to the foundations.

== See also ==
- List of patiences and solitaires
- Glossary of patience and solitaire terms

== Literature ==
- Bonaventure, George A. (1961) Games of Solitaire. Duffield & Green.
- Coops, Helen L. (1939). 100 Games of Solitaire.
- Dalton, W. (1909). "My Favourite Patiences" in The Strand Magazine, Vol. 38.
- Morehead, Albert H. & Mott-Smith, Geoffrey. (1949). The Complete Book of Solitaire and Patience Games. NY: Longmans.
- Morehead, Albert H. & Mott-Smith, Geoffrey. (2001) The Complete Book of Solitaire & Patience Games. Slough, Berkshire: Foulsham.
- Moyse, Alphonse (1950). 150 Ways to Play Solitaire.
- Parlett, David. (1979) The Penguin Book of Patience. London: Penguin.
