= Batsford (card game) =

Card solitare

- Solitaire game
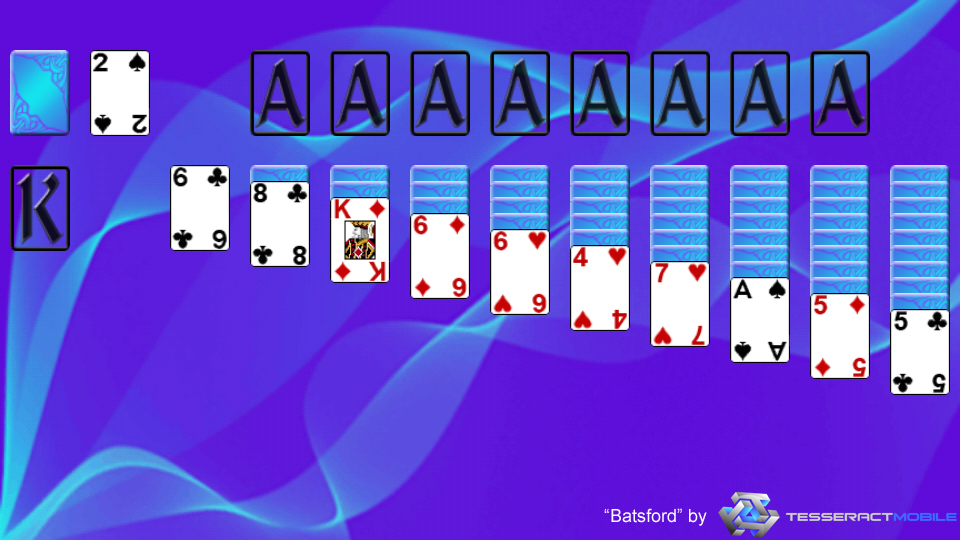
- Origin: Klondike
- Type: Simple packer
- Family: Klondike
- Deck: Two standard 52-card decks

Batsford is a solitaire card game similar to Klondike except that it uses two decks instead of one. The cards are turned up one at a time during a single pass through the deck, and there is also a reserve pile available for a single King.

== Rules ==
The object of this game is to move all cards to the foundations. There are eight foundations that build up from Ace to King in suit, (e.g. A♣, 2♣, 3♣, 4♣...)

There are ten dêpôts in the tableau ranging from one to ten cards long, and which build down in alternating colors, (e.g. 10♠, 9♥, 8♠, 7♦...) Cards in the tableu can be moved to a foundation or onto another tableau stack. Only a King can be moved to an empty space.

The layout also includes a single reserve pile where a single King can be held.

The stock is turned up one card up at a time. The topmost card can be moved to the foundations or the tableau. Only one pass is allowed through the deck, making this an extremely hard game to win.

== See also ==
- Klondike
- List of patiences and solitaires
- Glossary of patience and solitaire terms
