= Napoleon's Square =

- A Patience game
- Named variants: Le Carré Napoleon, Napoleon's Shoulder, McKinley's Square, Quadruple Line.
- Family: Napoleon at St Helena
- Deck: Double 52-card
- Playing time: 8 min
- Odds of winning: 9 in 10

Napoleon's Square is a patience or solitaire card game which uses two decks of playing cards. First described in a revised edition of Lady Cadogan's Illustrated Games of Patience or Solitaire in the early 1900s (as Le Carré Napoleon), it is an easy variation of Napoleon at St Helena (aka Forty Thieves). It is not determined if Napoleon actually played this game, or any solitaire game named after him.

== Rules ==
First, forty-eight cards are dealt into twelve piles of four cards each, forming three sides of a square. The rest of the deck consist the stock. Fourth "side" of the square is left to be occupied by the foundations.

The object of this game is to place the Aces as they become available and build each of them up to kings.

The top card of each pile is available for play, to be built on the foundations or on another pile. Cards on the tableau are built down in suit and sequences can be moved as a unit. Spaces, whenever they occur, can be filled with any available card or sequence.

When there are no more plays on the tableau that can be made, the stock is dealt one at a time, and any card that cannot be built on the foundations or on the tableau can be placed on a waste pile, the top card of which is available for play. The stock can only be dealt once.

The game ends soon after the stock has run out. The game is won (which is very likely) when all cards are built onto the foundations.

== Variant ==
Napoleon's Shoulder is a variant described in Magna's The Complete Book of Card Games (1993). The key differences are that cards may be packed down regardless of suit and that the piles may be examined. In another version only one card is dealt to each depot in the square at the beginning, similar to the variation described by Cadogan in the very first rule set of 1874.

== See also ==
- List of patiences and solitaires
- Glossary of patience and solitaire terms
