= Josephine (card game) =

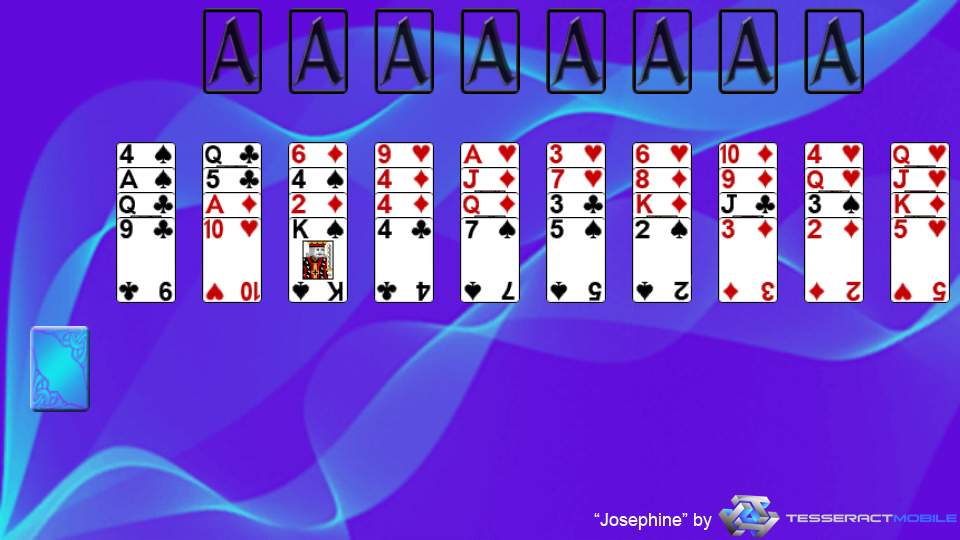
- Screenshot of a game
- Family: Napoleon at St Helena
- Deck: Double 52-card

Josephine is a patience or solitaire card game using two decks of playing cards. The object of the game is to move all of the cards to the Foundations. It is a variant of the more commonly known Napoleon at St Helena (sometimes known in America as Forty Thieves), and is named after Josephine de Beauharnais, Napoleon's first wife.

== Rules ==
Josephine has eight Foundations located towards the top that build up in suit from Ace to King, e.g. A♣, 2♣, 3♣, 4♣...

The Tableau is filled with ten piles containing four cards each that build down in suit, e.g. 8♥, 7♥, 6♥, 5♥...

One card up at a time is dealt from the stock. The top cards and cards dealt from the deck can be played onto the Tableau Piles or onto the Foundations. Sequenced cards of the same suit can be moved as a group throughout the Tableau. Any card can be played onto an empty tableau space. There are no redeals.

== See also ==
- List of patience and solitaire games
- Glossary of patience and solitaire terms

== Bibliography ==
- Coops, Helen Leslie (1939). 100 Games of Solitaire. Whitman. 128 pp.
