= Yukon (solitaire) =

Solitaire card game

- Solitaire game
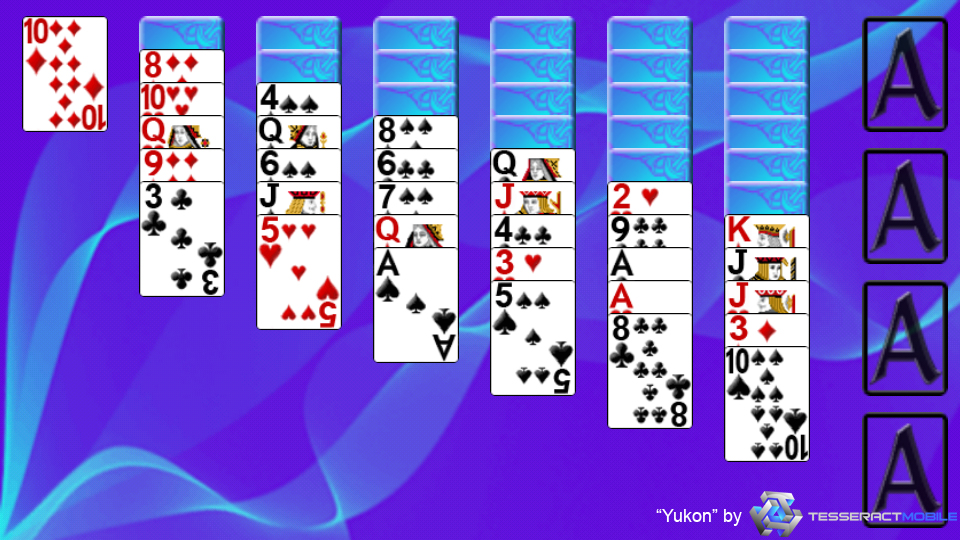
- Game setup
- Family: Klondike-like
- Deck: Single 52-card

Yukon is a type of solitaire card game using a single deck of playing cards like Klondike, but there is no deck or stock, and manipulation of the tableau works differently.

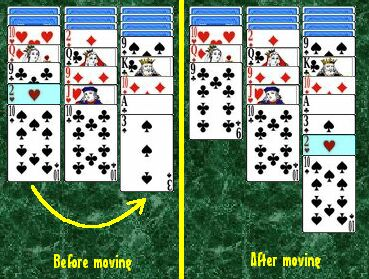
A legal move in Yukon: any face up card is available for play (as indicated by the darkened card) and is moved along with the cards on top of it.

== Rules ==
Yukon has the following adjustments to the game-play of standard Klondike solitaire:

- There are 7 rows of tableau stacks, and 4 foundations that build up in suit. Their lengths are respectively: 1, 6, 7, 8, 9, 10, 11. The topmost 5 cards of each stack are face-up, while the rest of the cards underneath them are face-down. (Second stack onwards is an ascending pyramid of face-down cards, each with 5 face-up cards appended on top).
- Groups of cards can be moved; the cards below the one to be moved do not need to be in any order, except that the starting and target cards must be built in sequence and in alternate color. For example, a group starting with a Red 3 can be moved on top a Black 4, and the cards below the Red 3 can differ.
- There is no stock in Yukon. All cards are dealt at the beginning; however, some are face down.

== Strategy ==
- Expose the face down cards as soon as possible, so you can start moving cards around.
- Moving the Aces to the Foundations as soon as possible is critical to gameplay.

== Variants ==
Russian Solitaire is a solitaire card game that is very similar in layout and play to Yukon. Its difference from Yukon is that building is by suit. The game should not be confused with Nidgi Novgorod, first recorded in the 1903 American Hoyle and also sometimes called Russian Solitaire, which is a simple, one-pack, non-builder, nor with Russian Patience, first described in 1876, which is a two-pack, open packer similar to Capricieuse.

Other Yukon variants remove the usual restriction that only Kings be placed in empty tableau spaces. Also closely related to Yukon are Alaska and Australian Patience.

== External Sources ==
- _ (1904). The Standard Hoyle, new and rev. edn. New York: Excelsior.
- Barry, Sheila Anne, World's Best Card Games for One
- Morehead, Albert H. & Mott-Smith, Geoffrey. The Complete Book of Solitaire & Patience Games
- Moyse Jr, Alphonse. 150 Ways to play Solitaire
- Parlett, David (1979). The Penguin Book of Patience. London: Penguin.

== See also ==
- Klondike
- Australian Patience
- List of solitaires
- Glossary of solitaire
