= Emperor (card game) =

Solitaire card game

- A Patience game
- Origin: England
- Alternative names: The Emperor, Emperor Patience
- Type: Simple packer
- Family: Napoleon at St Helena
- Deck: Double 52-card

Related games
- Deauville, Dress Parade, Rank and File

Emperor is an English patience or solitaire card game which is played using two packs of playing cards. Although similar to other members of the large Napoleon at St Helena family, Emperor introduced the unique and distinguishing feature of worrying back as well as the novel term "sealed packet".

Emperor is not to be confused with another patience sometimes called the Emperor of Germany.

== History ==
Rules for Emperor Patience appear in the 1890 edition of Mary Whitmore Jones' series of Games of Patience, the game featuring a new procedure known as 'worrying back' as well as the novel term "sealed packet". However these early rules were vague on the use of the rubbish heap and whether sequences could be moved between tableau piles. These issues are clarified in Tarbart's account of Emperor in 1901: only single cards, not sequences, could be moved, and the top card of the rubbish heap was available for play. This early form of Emperor appears to have survived until the 1960s. (Note: Dalton records it in 1967.) From the 1930s, accounts appear that allow entire sequences to be moved and this rule has become the norm. (Note: An early example is Coops (1939), but she is followed by Moyse (1950), Hervey (1977), and Magna (1993).) The accounts also vary in the use of the rubbish heap or wastepile; in some cases, once the stock is used up, a reserve of three cards is allowed, which may be replenished from the talon as cards are played from it. (Note: For example, Moyse (1950) and Hervey (1977).)

Emperor is sometimes equated in the literature to two other members of the Napoleon at St Helena family – Rank and File or Dress Parade and Deauville – probably because they are the only ones that share the same tableau layout. However, neither has the worrying back feature. The first appeared during the First World War as Rank and File, but, in later accounts, also as Dress Parade, perhaps to distinguish it from an earlier unrelated game also called Rank and File. Like modern Emperor, but unlike most games of the family, sequences could be moved from pile to pile. (Note: See, for example, Hervey (1977).) In 1939, rules for the second relative, Deauville, were published in which only single cards could be moved.

== Rules ==
The goal is to put the aces in the foundations as soon as they are available and build each foundation up in suit sequence to the king.

Forty cards are set up into ten columns of four cards each. Each column should have its bottom three cards face down (collectively known as a 'sealed packet') and its top card face up.

All the exposed (face-up) cards are available for play, to be built on the foundations or on other exposed cards on the tableau. When the top card of a column is played, it 'opens the sealed packet' i.e. the downcard beneath it is turned face-up and becomes exposed (i.e. it is now available to be played). Building in the tableau happens in descending order and by alternating color. Modern rule sets allow moving of packed sequences as a single unit, while the earlier rule sets do not permit this.

When all possible moves are made, the talon or stock is dealt one at a time. A card that cannot be played yet onto tableau or on the foundations is placed on the waste pile, the top card of which is available for play.

The game ends soon after the stock has run out. The game is won when all cards are built onto the foundations.

== See also ==
- List of patiences and solitaires
- Glossary of patience and solitaire terms

== Bibliography ==
- Dalton, Basil (1948, 1964, 1967). The Complete Patience Book. John Baker. 234 pp.
- Hervey, George F. (1977). The Illustrated Book of Card Games for One. London & NY: Hamlyn.
- Kansil, Joli Quentin (1999), ed. "Emperor" (p.311) in Bicycle Official Rules of Card Games. ISBN 1-889752-06-1
- Moyse, Alphonse (1950). 150 Ways to Play Solitaire. Cincinnati: USPCC.
- Parlett, David (1979). The Penguin Book of Patience, London: Penguin. ISBN 0-7139-1193-X
- Phillips, Hubert and Westall B.C. (1939,43,44,45). The Complete Book of Card Games. London: Witherby.
- "Tarbart" (1901). Games of Patience. De La Rue.
- Whitmore Jones, Mary (1890). Games of Patience for One or More Players. 2nd Series. London: L. Upcott Gill. NY: Scribner’s.
