= Diplomat (card game) =

Patience card game

- A Patience game
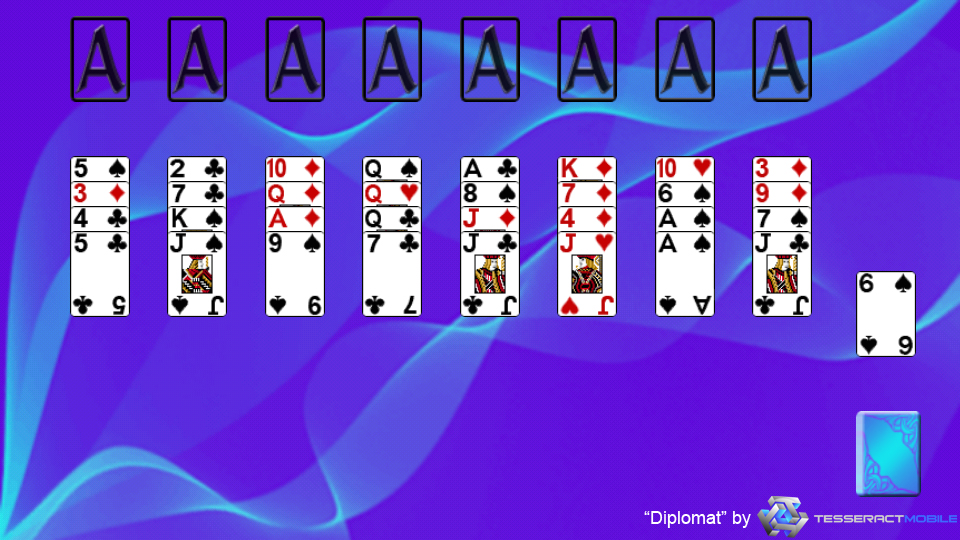
- Screenshot of Diplomat
- Family: Forty Thieves
- Deck: Double 52-card
- Odds of winning: 2 in 3

Diplomat is a patience or solitaire card game which is played using two decks of playing cards shuffled together. Its layout is similar to that of Beleaguered Castle, and the play is similar to Forty Thieves. It can be completed successfully more often than not.

== Rules ==
First, thirty-two cards each are dealt and arranged so that they form two columns of four rows (eight rows in total) of four cards each just as in Beleaguered Castle, making a point to leave room in between the two columns for the eight aces that form the bases of the foundations.

The top cards of each row of cards for play to the foundations on the center of the columns or around the tableau (the eight rows). The foundations are built up by suit up to kings, while the cards in the tableau are built down regardless of suit. When a space occurs in the tableau, it can be filled by any available card. Only one card can be moved at a time.

When there are no available moves—or if the players has done all plays one can make—the stock is dealt one at a time. Any card that cannot be played to the foundations or the tableau can be placed on the wastepile, the top card of which is available for play. The stock can only be dealt once.

The game ends as soon as after the entire stock is dealt. The game is won when all cards end up in the foundations.

== Variants ==
Other closely related games include Congress and Parliament, which are also two deck games in the style of Forty Thieves with tableaus of eight columns.

== See also ==
- Beleaguered Castle
- Forty Thieves
- List of patiences and solitaires
- Glossary of patience and solitaire terms
