= Silver Creek Entertainment =

- Type: Video Game Developer
- Industry: Video games
- Founded: 1994
- Products: Casual games
- Website: www.silvercrk.com

Silver Creek Entertainment is a U.S.-based game developer of classic card games. It was established in 1994. The company released games for Xbox Live Arcade, Windows and Mac OS X:

- Hardwood Solitaire III (PC, Mac)
- Ruckus Bucks's Dangerous Mines (Xbox, PC, Mac)
- Hardwood Solitaire IV (iOS, Android, Nook, Kindle, PC, Mac, AppleTV)
- Hardwood Backgammon (Xbox 360, iOS, Android, Nook, Kindle, PC, Mac, AppleTV)
- Hardwood Hearts (Xbox 360, iOS, Android, Nook, Kindle, PC, Mac, AppleTV)
- Hardwood Spades (Xbox 360, iOS, Android, Nook, Kindle, PC, Mac, AppleTV)
- Hardwood Euchre (iOS, Android, Nook, Kindle, PC, Mac, AppleTV)
- Video Poker Duel (iOS, Android, Nook, Kindle, PC, Mac, AppleTV)
- Soltrio Solitaire (Xbox 360)
- InstaSpades (Web Game)
- Insta Hearts (Web Game)
- Insta Solitaire IV (Web Game)

== Awards ==
- Hardwood Hearts won Computer Gaming World's Card & Casino Games category at ZDNet's 7th Annual Shareware Awards.
