= Eight Off =

Card game

- A patience game
- Family: Freecell
- Deck: Single 52-card

Eight Off is a patience or solitaire card game, named after its employment of eight cells, played with one deck of playing cards. The object of the game is to move all the cards into the foundations. It served as a partial inspiration for and is very similar to the popular solitaire game FreeCell.

== Rules ==
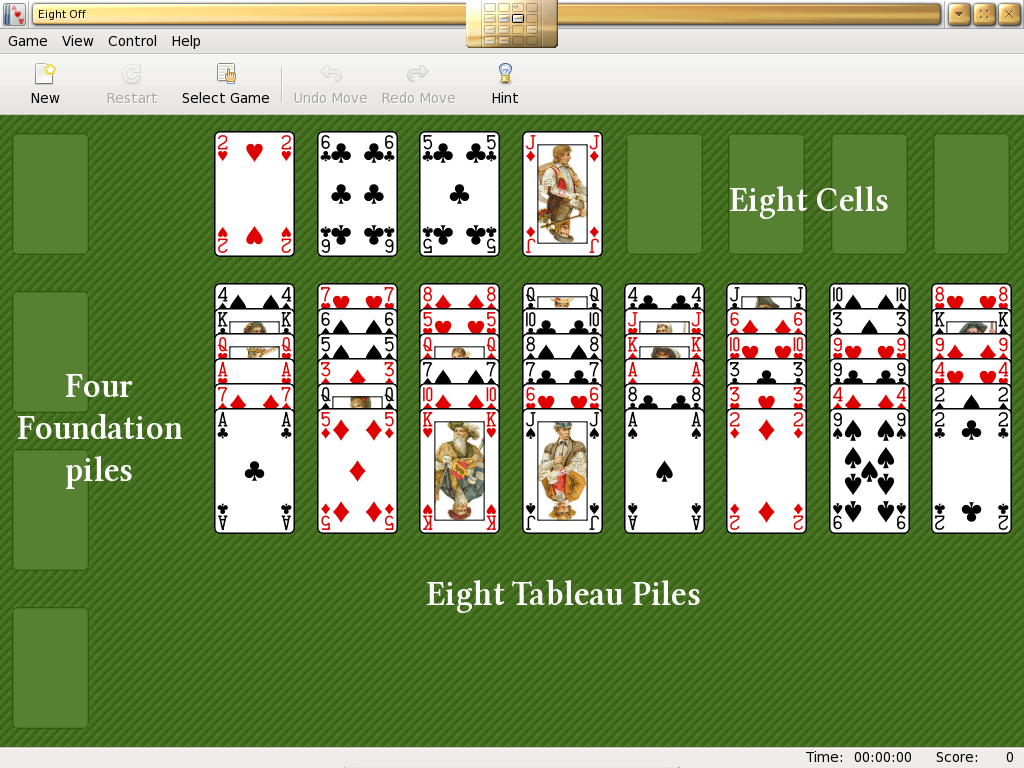
Initial Layout

The cards are dealt, face up, into eight columns (or piles) of six cards each. (These eight columns make up the tableau.) The remaining four cards go into the first four cells. When dealt, the table should bear some resemblance to the picture on the right, although a layout with the cells on the left and the foundations at the top is another option.

The eight slots along the top of the picture represent the cells. These cells can be used to temporarily store any available card from the table. Four of the cells are filled at the beginning of the game.

The four slots along the left of the picture represent the four foundations. These, as in Klondike, are meant to be built up in suit from Ace to King. That is, each foundation begins with the Ace of one suit and is followed by the 2 of the same suit, which is followed by the 3 of the same suit, and so forth, until all the cards through the King have been placed on the foundation.

The tableau piles which fill the majority of the figure are where most of the game play occurs. The cards are, again, all face up, and are built down, traditionally by suit. (Players can modify the difficulty of the game, if they like, by building down in a different manner. For example, one could play by alternating colours, the way Klondike is played).

Technically, one may only move the cards between columns one at a time; however, the presence of a free cell essentially increases the number of cards that can be moved. (e.g., if there are three open cells, four cards can be moved at once—one for each cell, and the one that can always be moved.)

If a column is emptied, most rules allow for one to only place Kings in the empty space, regardless of suit (as long as it follows the other restrictions on moving cards). Players, however, may prefer to simplify this rule to any card (as it is in FreeCell).

== Descendants ==
Eight Off is similar to Baker's Game, which was named after the mathematician C.L. Baker. Both games were precursors to the more popular FreeCell. While not as popular as FreeCell, they are included in some collections of computer solitaire games.

== See also ==
- Baker's Game
- FreeCell
- List of solitaires
- Glossary of solitaire
