= FreeCell =

Solitaire card game

- A patience game
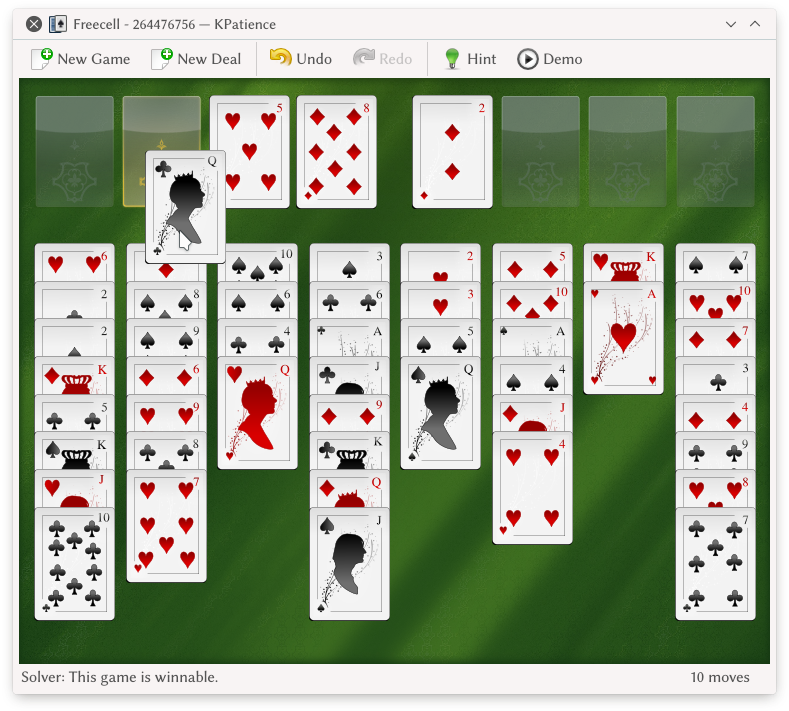
- A game of Freecell on KDE
- Named variant: Baker's Game
- Family: Freecell
- Deck: Single 52-card

FreeCell is a solitaire card game played using the standard 52-card deck. It is fundamentally different from most solitaire games in that very few deals are unsolvable, and all cards are dealt face-up from the beginning of the game. It was originally created as a computer game by Paul Alfille. Microsoft has included an implementation of FreeCell in every release of the Windows operating system since 1995, which has greatly contributed to the game's popularity.

== Rules ==
One standard 52-card deck is used. There are four open cells and four open foundations. Cards are dealt face-up into eight cascades, four of which comprise seven cards each and four of which comprise six cards each.

The top card of each cascade begins a sequence. Tableaus must be built down by alternating colors. Foundations are built up by suit. The foundations begin with Ace and are built up to King.

Any cell card or top card of any cascade may be moved to build on a tableau, or moved to an empty cell, an empty cascade, or its foundation.

The game is won after all cards are moved to their foundation piles.

=== Supermoves ===
In FreeCell, unlike many solitaire card games, only one card may be moved at a time. Complete or partial tableaus may be moved to build on existing tableaus, or moved to empty cascades only by a sequence of moves which recursively place and remove cards through intermediate locations.

For example, with one empty cell, the top card of one tableau can be moved to a free cell. The second card from the top of that tableau can now be moved onto another tableau. Then the original top card can be moved from the cell on top of it.

Such a sequence of moves is called a "supermove". Computer implementations often show this motion, but players using physical decks typically just move the tableau at once.

The maximum number $C$ of cards in a tableau that can be moved to another tableau equals the number of empty cells plus one, with that number doubling for each empty cascade: $C = 2^M\times (N+1)$, where $M$ is the number of empty cascades and $N$ is the number of empty cells. The maximum number that can be moved to an empty cascade is $C/2$.

== Numbered hands ==
Although software implementations vary, most versions label the hands with a number derived from the seed value used by the random number generator to shuffle the cards.

Microsoft FreeCell is so definitive for FreeCell players that many other software implementations include compatibility with its random number generator in order to replicate its numbered hands.

== History and variants ==
One of the oldest ancestors of FreeCell is Eight Off. In the June 1968 edition of Scientific American, Martin Gardner described in his "Mathematical Games" column a game by C. L. Baker which is similar to FreeCell, except that cards on the tableau are built by suit rather than by alternate colors. Gardner wrote, "The game was taught to Baker by his father, who in turn learned it from an Englishman during the 1920s." This variant is now called Baker's Game. FreeCell's origins may date back even further to 1945 and to a Scandinavian game called Napoleon in St. Helena (not the solitaire game Napoleon at St Helena, also known as Forty Thieves).

Paul Alfille changed Baker's Game by making cards build according to alternate colors, thus creating FreeCell. He implemented the first computerised version as a medical student at the University of Illinois, in the TUTOR programming language for the PLATO educational computer system in 1978. Alfille was able to display easily recognizable graphical images of playing cards on the 512 × 512 monochrome display on the PLATO systems.

This original FreeCell environment allowed games with 4–10 columns and 1–10 cells in addition to the standard 8 × 4 game. For each variant, the program stored a ranked list of the players with the longest winning streaks. There was also a tournament system that allowed people to compete to win difficult hand-picked deals. Paul Alfille described this early FreeCell environment in more detail in an interview from 2000.

In 2012, researchers used evolutionary computation methods to create winning FreeCell players.

A variant where card sequence movement is not limited by available cells is known as Relaxed FreeCell.

Other solitaire games related to or inspired by FreeCell include Seahaven Towers, Penguin, Stalactites, ForeCell, Antares (a cross with Scorpion).

== Unsolvable hands ==
In 2018, Theodore Pringle and Shlomi Fish found that, of 8.6 billion FreeCell Pro deals, 102,075 deals were impossible to solve, or approximately one impossible deal out of 84,000 random deals. It is estimated that around 99.999% of possible deals are solvable. Deal number 11982 from the Windows version of FreeCell is an example of an unsolvable FreeCell deal, the only deal among the original "Microsoft 32,000" which is unsolvable.

== Solver complexity ==
The FreeCell game has a constant number of cards. This implies that in constant time, a person or computer could list all of the possible moves from a given start configuration and discover a winning set of moves or, assuming the game cannot be solved, the lack thereof. To perform an interesting complexity analysis, one must construct a generalized version of the FreeCell game with 4 × n cards. This generalized version of the game is NP-complete; it is unlikely that any algorithm more efficient than a brute-force search exists which can find solutions for arbitrary generalized FreeCell configurations.

There are 52! (i.e., 52 factorial), or approximately 8×10^{67}, distinct deals. However, some games are effectively identical to others because suits assigned to cards are arbitrary or columns can be swapped. After taking these factors into account, there are approximately 1.75×10^{64} distinct games.

== See also ==
- Eight Off
- Baker's Game
- Klondike
- Penguin
- List of solitaires
- Glossary of solitaire

== Additional sources ==
- "OHSU scientists say FreeCell can be adapted to spot early signs of dementia". Oregon Health & Science University. Archived from the original on February 27, 2021.
- O'Hale, Marty M. (August 14, 2007). "The Four Virtues of FreeCell". The Escapist Magazine. Archived from the original on August 8, 2011.
