= Poola Rangadu =

Poola Rangadu may refer to:

- Poola Rangadu (1967 film), an Indian Telugu-language crime thriller film
- Poola Rangadu (2012 film), an Indian Telugu-language action comedy film

== See also ==
- Flower garden (disambiguation)
