= Westcliff (card game) =

- A Patience game
- Type: Simple packer
- Family: Napoleon at St Helena
- Deck: Single 52-card
- Playing time: 5 min
- Odds of winning: Classic game: ~1 in 4 American game: 9 in 10

Westcliff is the name of two closely related patience or card solitaire games of the simple packer type, both of which are played using a deck of 52 playing cards. One version is particularly easy to win, with odds of 9 in 10; the other is harder with odds closer to 1 in 4. The game has a variant, Easthaven.

== History and naming ==
The first known rules for this two-variant family were published under the name Westcliff Patience by Mary Whitmore Jones in 1911, who describes it as a "tantalising little game." This original version had a tableau of 21 cards in three overlapping rows. Packed sequences could be moved at will to spaces or other piles, but no more rows were dealt. Coops (1939) records it possibly for the first time in US also under the name of Westcliff and this is the name Parlett (1979) uses. Parlett also points out, however, the confusion generated by Morehead & Mott-Smith in 1949 when they described two new variants. Westcliff, the version with a 21-card tableau, was renamed Easthaven, and its rules eased to allow further rows of 7 cards to be dealt, but a restriction was placed on the filling of spaces. Meanwhile, the name Westcliff was transferred to a new variant with a 30-card tableau arranged in 10 piles of three cards. Its mechanics were the same as the original Westcliff, but the larger tableau made it easier to win.

== Rules ==
=== Classic Westcliff ===
The following rules are based on the original description by Whitmore Jones (1911), supplemented where necessary by Parlett (1979):

One pack is required. Two rows of seven cards are dealt face down, followed by a third row, face up, the rows overlapping. Aces are removed, as they appear, to begin the foundations and built up in suit sequence to the Kings. Cards are dealt singly from the talon to the foundations or tableau if possible or to a rubbish-heap if not. (Note: Presumably the top card of the wastepile is available for play, but neither Whitmore Jones nor Parlett explicitly state this.)

Exposed cards on the tableau may be packed on in descending sequence and alternating colour. As exposed cards are moved, the card beneath is turned up and used if possible.

Any exposed card or packed sequence may be moved either to fill a space or onto a card of the next higher value and different colour. There is no re-deal. The patience is out when all four foundations are built up in suit to the King.

=== American Westcliff ===
The following description of Westcliff reflects Morehead & Mott-Smith (1949) except where noted:

First, ten columns of three cards each are dealt face down, then the top card of each column is turned face up.

The face-up cards are available for play either on the foundations or on each other on the tableau. The foundations are built up by suit from Ace to King. The tableau cards are built down by alternating colour. A sequence of cards formed can be moved as a unit in part or altogether. Any face-down card once exposed is turned face up and a space that is exposed as a result of emptying a column can be filled with any card or sequence.

When there are no more moves to be made, the stock is dealt to the waste pile one at a time. Any card that cannot be built yet to the foundations or on the tableau is placed on the waste pile, the top card of which is available for play. The stock can only be dealt once.

The game is won when all cards are built onto the foundations and there is a 9 in 10 chance of winning.

=== Easthaven ===
The variant of Easthaven, first recorded by Morehead & Mott-Smith in 1949, differs from the later, American, form of Westcliff in the following points:

- Only seven piles of three cards are dealt; thus the tableau is the same as that of classic Westcliff.
- When no more play is possible, another row of seven cards may be dealt, face up, onto the seven depots of the tableau.
- The last three cards in hand are dealt to the first three depots of the tableau.
- A space may only be filled by a King or a sequence with a King at the base.

== See also ==
- List of patiences and solitaires
- Glossary of patience and solitaire terms

== Bibliography ==
- Coops, Helen Leslie (1939). 100 Games of Solitaire. Whitman. 128 pp.
- Morehead, A. H. & G. Mott-Smith (1949). The Complete Book of Solitaire and Patience Games. NY: Longmans.
- Parlett, David (1979). The Penguin Book of Patience, Penguin, London. ISBN 0-7139-1193-X
- Whitmore Jones, Mary (1911). New Games of Patience. 2nd series. London: L. Upcott Gill.
