= United Basketball League =

Semi-professional basketball league in the Southern US

- United Basketball League
- Sport: Basketball
- Founded: 2008
- No. of teams: 8
- Country: United States
- Most recent champion: Arkansas Bobcats (2016)
- Most titles: Arkansas Bobcats (4)
- Website: ublhoops.com

The United Basketball League is a spring semi-professional basketball league based in the Southern United States.

== History ==
Founded by Mac Claire in 2006 as the Regional Basketball League, the UBL began its inaugural season in the spring of 2008. With an aim to provide stable, family-friendly basketball teams for all to enjoy, the UBL presently consists of eight teams.

== Teams ==
Team	Location	Arena	Formed
Arkansas Bobcats	Little Rock, Arkansas	Jack Stephens Center	2012
Arkansas Warriors	Wrightsville, Arkansas	Senator Bill Walker Jr. Gymnasium	2008
Baton Rouge Falcons	Baton Rouge, Louisiana		2015
Cedar Valley Titans	Waterloo, Iowa		2015
Missouri Quake	Essex, Missouri	RIchland High School	2015
Texas Cagers	Dallas, Texas		2015
Texas Wranglers	Addison, Texas	Greenhill Sport Complex	2008
Tulsa Tornadoes	Tulsa, Oklahoma	Travel team	2009

=== Former teams ===
- Texas Capital Sounds / San Marcos Knights (2006)
- San Antonio Soul (2006)
- Arkansas Select (2009)
- Austin/Round Rock Rhythm (2012–13)
- Central Texas Stars (2008)
- East Tyler I-20 Pros (2009)
- Metroplex Lightning (2013)
- Mississippi Tornadoes (2011–13)
- Missouri Terrors (2013)
- New Mexico Power (2009)
- Oklahoma Impact (2008–11)
- On Point Hoops (2012)
- Springfield Thrill (2011–13)
- St. Louis Scorpions (2013)
- Texas Outlaws (2009)

== Champions ==
Season	Winner	Runner-up	Result
2008	Central Texas Stars		
2009	Oklahoma Impact	Arkansas Warriors	116-101
2010	Oklahoma Impact		
2011	Texas Wranglers	Arkansas Warriors	100-96
2012	Texas Wranglers	On Point Hoops	113-111
2013	Arkansas Bobcats	Arkansas Warriors	97-94
2014	Arkansas Bobcats	Texas Wranglers	111-106
2015	Arkansas Bobcats	Texas Wranglers	134-104
2016	Arkansas Bobcats	Texas Wranglers	128-100
2017	Arkansas Bobcats	Arkansas Warriors	117-104
2018	Oklahoma Outlaws	Baton Rouge Hurricanes	162-159
2019	Oklahoma Outlaws	Dallas Kings	132-121
2021	Texas Wranglers	DTX Wolfpack	121-120

== See also ==
- List of developmental and minor sports leagues
