= Aces Up =

Solitaire card game

- Solitaire game
- Alternative names: Firing Squad, Drivel Patience, Idiot's Delight
- Type: Closed non-builder
- Family: Discarding
- Deck: Single 52-card
- Playing time: 2–4 min
- Odds of winning: 1 in 35

Aces Up is a quick and simple, one-pack, solitaire card game.

One advantage of Aces Up is its minimal use of space: it requires only four piles of cards, and a place to discard cards to. While the winnability of any given deal of aces up can be quite high, the actual win rate with normal play is about 1 in every 35 games.

== Names ==
Aces Up is also known as Aces High, Idiot's Delight, Firing-Squad and Drivel or Drivel Patience. It shares the name Idiot's Delight with two other unrelated solitaire games, Perpetual Motion and King Albert. It shares the name Aces Up with Easthaven, which is a variation of Klondike and is also unrelated.

== History ==
The rules are first recorded in England as Drivel Patience by Mary Whitmore Jones in 1900 who acknowledges that "this is not a complimentary name... but it is the one by which it is generally known, and to those accustomed to play games required care and consideration it seems appropriate enough to this one, which stands in need of neither." In 1940, Wood & Goddard describe it under the name of Firing Squad, but most later authors call it Aces Up, while sometimes acknowledging its earlier names. Spadaccini (2005) is an exception, calling the game Idiot's Delight and giving alternative names as Aces Up and Aces High.

== Rules ==
Gameplay for Aces Up works as follows:

1. Deal four cards in a row face up.
2. If there are two or more cards of the same suit, discard all but the highest-ranked card of that suit. Aces rank high.
3. Repeat step 2 until there are no more pairs of cards with the same suit.
4. Whenever there are any empty spaces, you may choose the top card of another pile to be put into the empty space. After you do this, go to Step 2.
5. When there are no more cards to move or remove, deal out the next four cards from the deck face-up onto each pile.
6. Repeat Step 2, using only the visible, or top, cards on each of the four piles.
7. When the last four cards have been dealt out and any moves made, the game is over. The fewer cards left in the tableau, the better. To win is to have only the four aces left.

When the game ends, the number of discarded cards is your score. The maximum score (and thus the score necessary to win) is 48, which means all cards have been discarded except for the four aces, thus the name of the game.

== Variations ==
A much more challenging variation on Aces Up allows only the aces to be moved onto an empty pile. This makes game play much more restrictive and consequently the game can only be completed roughly once in every 270 games.

== See also ==
- List of patiences and solitaires
- Glossary of patience and solitaire terms

== Literature ==
- Parlett, David (1979). The Penguin Book of Patience, Penguin, London. {ISBN 0-7139-1193-X
- Spadaccini, Stephanie (2005). The Big Book of Rules. London, NY: Penguin. ISBN 0-452-28644-1
- Whitmore Jones, Mary (1900). Games of Patience for One or More Players. 5th Series. Lon: L. Upcott Gill.
- Wood, Clement and Gloria Goddard (1940). The Complete Book of Games. Garden City.
