= Four Seasons (card game) =

Solitaire game

- A Patience game
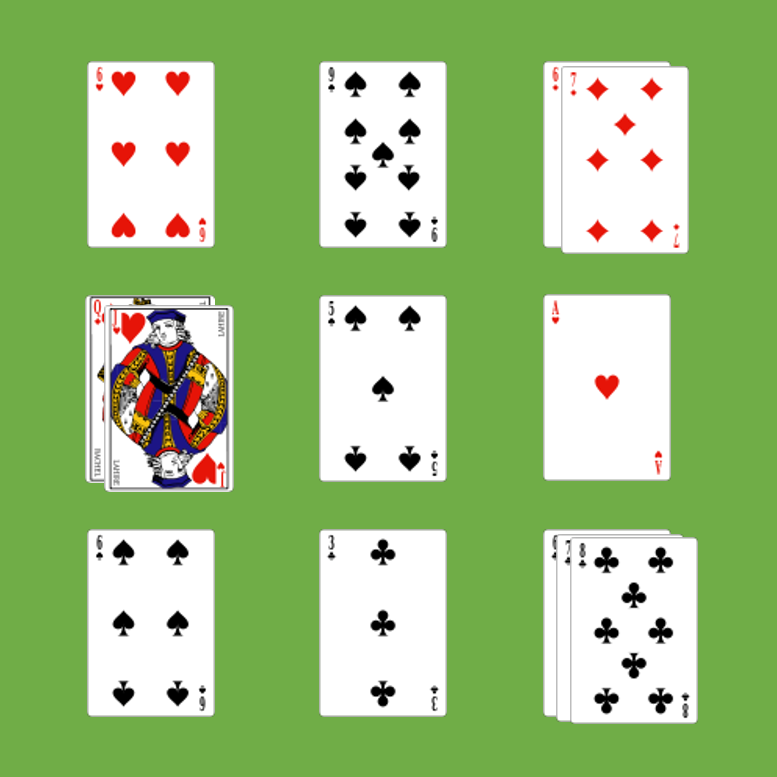
- Four Seasons during play
- Named variants: Czarina, Corner Card, Vanishing Cross
- Type: Simple packer
- Deck: Single 52-card
- Playing time: 5 min
- Odds of winning: 1 in 10

Four Seasons is a patience or card solitaire which is played with a single deck of playing cards. It is also known as Corner Card and Vanishing Cross, due to the arrangement of the foundations and the tableau respectively. Another alternate name is Cross Currents.

Albert Morehead and Geoffrey Mott-Smith rate the odds of successfully completing Four Seasons as 1 in 10.

It should not be confused with another simple packer, Fortune's Favor, which was originally also called The Four Seasons.

== History ==
The rules were first published in 1883 by Dick under the name The Four Seasons which used a 3 x 3 card layout, the foundations being the four corners. In 1898, Mary Whitmore Jones published essentially the same game under the name Czarina Patience using an 'exploded' layout in which the four corner cards were moved away from the tableau which now assumed the form of a cross of five cards. This version is subsequently recorded by Dalton (1948). The game has generally been known as Four Seasons, but some sources cite Corner Card, Corners and Vanishing Cross as alternatives. David Parlett commends the name Vanishing Cross as the best title, alluding to what happens to the tableau cross if the player is successful.

== Rules ==
=== Four Seasons (original rules) ===
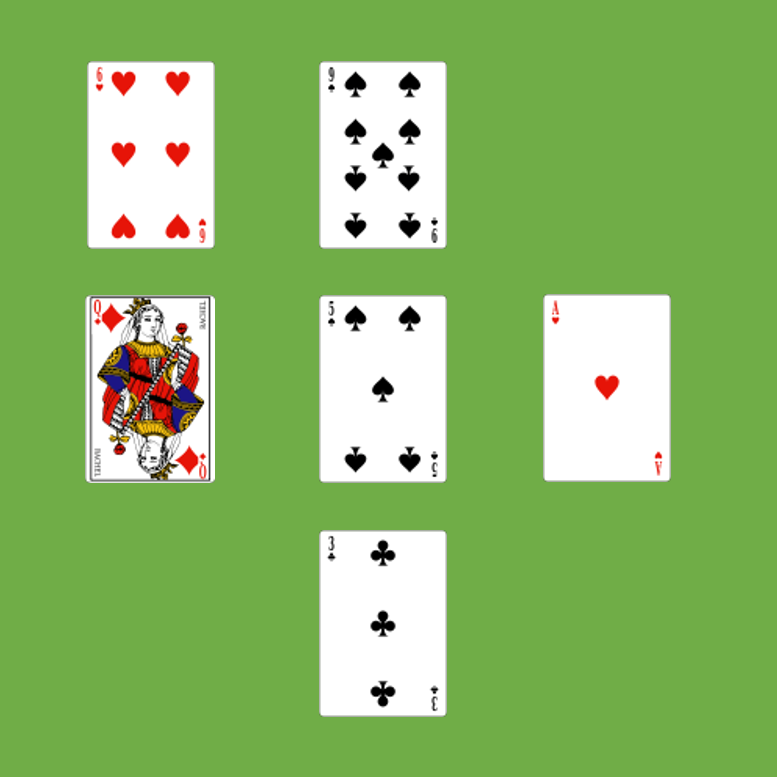
Four Seasons - the initial layout. The ♥6, as the first (or sixth) card dealt, forms the first foundation. As others appear they will go in the remaining corners.

The following rules are based on Dick (1883):

The layout comprises three rows of three depots, within which there is a tableau of five cards in a cruciform and a foundation at each corner. The aim is to build the foundations up in ascending suit sequence, (Note: The Ace following the King if need be) using the tableau by packing cards in descending sequence in any suit.

Cards are dealt singly from the pack. The first goes to the upper left corner as the base card of the first foundation; the other three cards of the same denomination are placed on the other corners as they appear. Any suitable cards are built on the foundations; otherwise cards are dealt to the cross until its five depots are filled. The tableau is then examined and any marriages made by moving a card onto another one that is one higher in rank. Once all possible moves have been made, another card is dealt and so on. Cards that cannot be used on the foundations or to form marriages are discarded to a wastepile. (Note: Dick calls it a talon, but that term is usually reserved for the cards held in the hand.)

Vacancies in the tableau are filled immediately, either by the uppermost card from another pile or by a card from the wastepile. Only if the wastepile is exhausted may a space be filled by the next card from the pack. Sequences in the tableau may be moved from one pile to another "at pleasure". (Note: Presumably this follows the usual rule that the top card of the new pile must extend the existing sequence.) There is no re-deal.

=== Four Seasons (later rules) ===
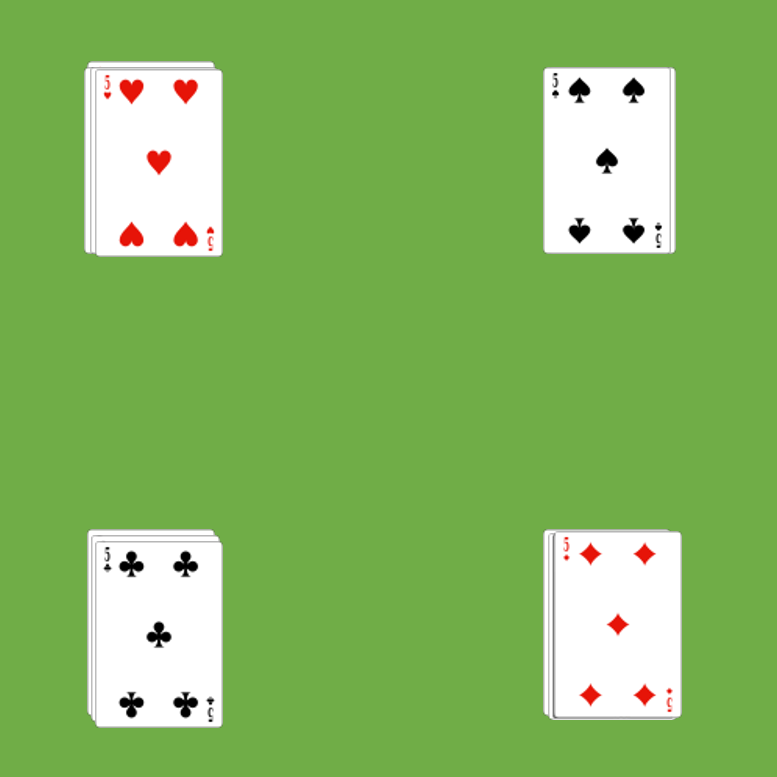
If won, the final layout would look something like this, assuming Sixes were the base cards

First, five cards are dealt in form of a cross: three cards are placed in a row, then two cards are each placed above and below the middle of the three cards. A sixth card is dealt in the upper left corner of the cross. This card will be the base for the first of four foundations. During the game the three other cards of this rank will eventually be placed in the other three corners of the cross as foundations.

The foundations are built up according to suit, and building is round-the-corner, i.e. aces are placed above kings, except when aces are the foundation bases.

Cards in the cross are built down regardless of suit and any space in the cross is filled with any available card, whether it is the top card of a pile within the cross, the top card of the wastepile, or a card from the stock. Like the foundations, building in the cross is round-the-corner, i.e. kings are placed over aces, unless aces are the foundations. Only one card can be moved at a time.

Whenever the game goes on a standstill, the stock is dealt one card at a time into the wastepile, the top card of which is available for play on the cross or on the foundations. There is no redeal.

The game ends if a standstill occurs after the stock has run out. The game is won when all cards end up in the foundations.

== Variations ==
Variations of Four Seasons include:

- In Czarina, any space in the cross is immediately filled only from the stock.
- In Corners, the cross is a reserve instead of a tableau, with each space being a cell that can hold at most one card. Empty cells in this game are filled immediately from the stock.
- In Simplicity, instead of a cross the tableau contains twelve cards dealt into two rows of six. The thirteenth card dealt becomes the base of the first foundation. Also, building in the tableau is down by alternating colors.

Other related games include Florentine Patience and Little Windmill.

== See also ==
- List of patiences and solitaires
- Glossary of patience and solitaire terms
