= Cruel (solitaire) =

1990 solitaire card game

Cruel starting position

Cruel is a solitaire card game based on Perseverance. Cruel became popular when it was published as video game for Microsoft Windows by Microsoft in 1990 as part of the Microsoft Entertainment Pack for Windows 3.0. Cruel has since been remade for other platforms by several vendors.

== Rules ==
Cruel uses a standard deck of 52 playing cards. The aces are placed face up to act as the foundations, upon which the suits will be built in sequence. The rest of the cards are shuffled and then dealt in 12 tableau piles, each with four cards.

The aim of the game is to place all the cards on the foundation piles, ordered from ace to king, using an unlimited number of moves.

For each move the player chooses any one of the top (exposed) cards from a tableau pile and places it either:

- on another tableau pile – on the next higher value in the same suit (for example, the 5♣ can be placed on the 6♣), or
- on a foundation pile – on the next lower value in the same suit (for example, the 8♣ can be placed on the 7♣).

Only one card may be moved at a time.

At any time the player may have the tableau piles re-dealt, whereby they are collected together in sequence (from left to right, row by row) without shuffling and dealt in piles of four. This is activated by the "Deal" button.

The game is won when all the cards are on the foundation piles. The game is lost if no more moves are possible even if re-dealt.

== See also ==
- Perseverance
- List of solitaires
- Glossary of solitaire
