= Flower Garden (card game) =

- A Patience or card solitaire
- Alternative names: The Bouquet, The Garden
- Family: Fan
- Deck: Single 52-card

The Flower Garden is an old patience or card solitaire using a single deck of 52 playing cards, and is based on an old Japanese game. It was first called Le Parterre, but is also known under the names The Bouquet and The Garden. The terms used in this game are related to gardening. Some skill is needed to successfully complete the game, and skilful players can win more than 20% of the time.

== Rules ==
Thirty-six cards are dealt in to six columns, each containing six cards. The columns are called the "flower beds" and the entire tableau is sometimes called "the garden." The sixteen leftover cards become the reserve, or "the bouquet." Some sources instead refer to this reserve as the "seeds", and the built-up foundations as the "bouquets".

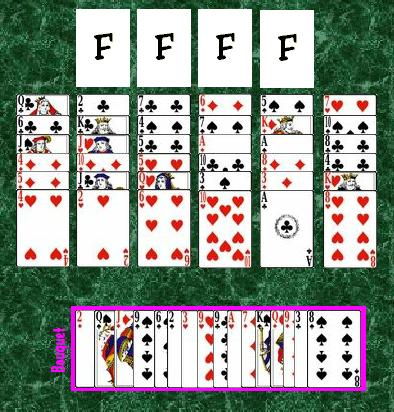
The initial layout in the game of Flower Garden

The top cards of each flower-bed and all of the cards in the bouquet are available for play. Cards can only be moved one at a time and can be built either on the foundations or on the other flower beds. The foundations are built up by suit, from Ace to King (a general idea of the game is to release the aces first). The cards in the garden, on the other hand, can be built down regardless of suit and any empty flower bed can be filled with any card. The cards in the bouquet can be used to aid in building, be put into the foundations, or fill an empty flower bed.

The game is won when all cards end up in the foundations.

== Variations ==
An slightly easier variant of Flower Garden uses a tableau with seven columns of only five cards each, and a reserve of 17 cards.

Other variations include Wildflower (allows sequences to be moved), Brigade, and Stonewall.

== See also ==
- Stonewall
- List of patiences and solitaires
- Glossary of patience and solitaire terms
