= Scorpion (solitaire) =

Patience game

- A Patience game
- Initial setup
- Named variants: Scorpion II, Three Blind Mice, Wasp
- Family: Spider
- Deck: Single 52-card

Scorpion is a patience or solitaire card game using a deck of 52 playing cards. Although somewhat related to Spider, the method of game play is akin to Yukon. The object of this game is to form four columns of suit sequence cards from king down to ace.

== Gameplay ==
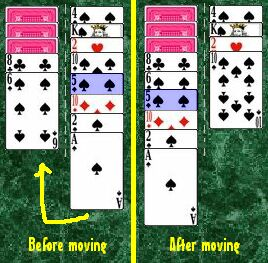
A legal move in Scorpion: any face up card is available for play (as indicated by the darkened card) and is moved along with the cards on top of it.

The game starts with 49 cards dealt into seven columns of seven cards each on the tableau. The first four columns each have three face-down cards with four face-up cards placed over them. The cards in the remaining three columns are all faced up. The three leftover cards are set aside for later.

Cards in the tableau are built down by suit and every face up card is available for play, no matter where in the column it is. That means that any card can be placed on top of a card that is a rank higher. Once a card from the bottom or middle of a column is moved, all cards on top of it are moved as well, as one unit. Nothing can be placed on an ace and gaps on the tableau can only be taken by kings or sequences with Kings as their top cards. Once a face-down card is exposed, it is turned face up.

When no more moves are possible, the three leftover cards are dealt onto the first three columns and put into play.

As earlier mentioned, the object of the game is to build four columns of suit sequences from king down to ace. So when one such column is built successfully, it is a general rule to leave this column alone, unless it covers a face-down card.

The game is won when the object is fulfilled.

== Variants ==
Scorpion II is an alternate version of the game in which the number of columns containing three face-down cards and the number of columns in which all cards are faced up are the reverse of the prevalent version, i.e. the first three columns each have three face-down cards with four face-up cards placed over them while the cards in the remaining four columns are all faced up. Despite the reversal, the game remains the same but making it easier than regular "Scorpion".

Wasp is almost identical to Scorpion, except that when a space is formed in the tableau, any card or sequence can be placed in it. This gives the player more chances of winning than in Scorpion.

Three Blind Mice is another Scorpion variation with a starting tableau of 10 columns of five cards. The three rightmost columns should each have three bottom cards faced down and two top cards face up. The three cards in each of those columns gave the game its name after the nursery rhyme. The five cards in each of the rest of the columns are all face up. The two leftover cards are set aside face up to be used any time in the game whenever necessary. Game play is the same as in Scorpion.

== See also ==
- Yukon
- List of solitaire games
- Glossary of solitaire terms
