= Napoleon at St Helena =

Card game

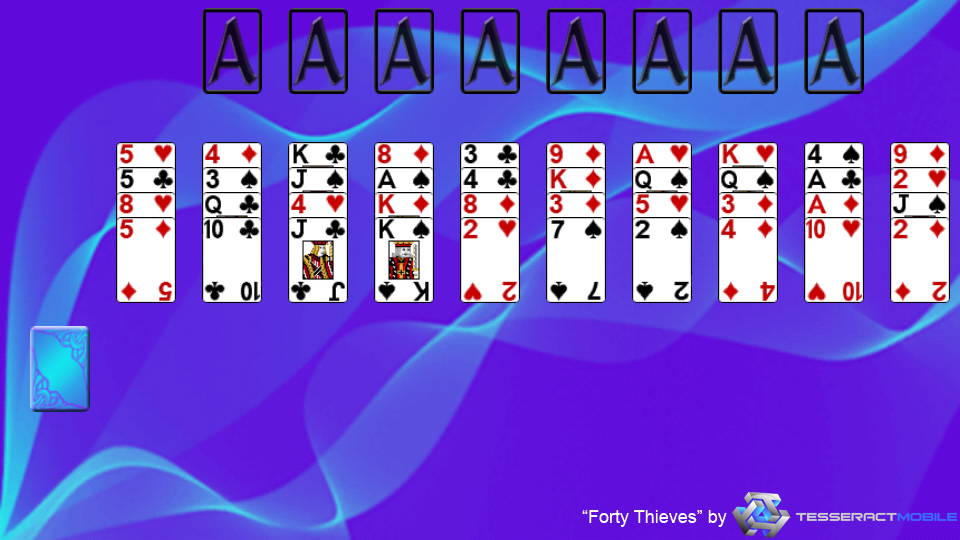
- Screenshot of a game
- Alternative names: Big Forty, Le Cadran, Forty Thieves, Roosevelt at San Juan
- Named variants: See § Variants
- Family: Napoleon at St Helena
- Deck: Double 52-card
- Playing time: 20 min
- Odds of winning: 1 in 10

Napoleon at St Helena is a 2-deck patience or solitaire card game for one player. It is quite difficult to win, and luck-of-the-draw is a significant factor. The emperor Napoleon often played patience during his final exile to the island of St Helena, and this is said to be the version he probably played. Along with its variants, it is one of the most popular two-deck patiences or solitaires. The winning chances have been estimated as 1 in 10 games, with success typically dependent on the player's ability to clear one or more columns. The game is the progenitor of a large family of similar games, mostly with variations designed to make it easier to win, or "get out".

Alternative names include Le Cadran ('The Dial') and, in the US, Forty Thieves, Big Forty and Roosevelt at San Juan.

== History ==
"Napoleon at St. Helena" is recorded as early as 1870 by Annie Henshaw who describes it as a "most excellent game which has the added charm of having been a favorite with Napoleon at St. Helena". The game appears frequently in patience collections of the late 19th century. Lady Adelaide Cadogan (1874) calls it Le Cadran which reinforces a possible French origin. In the 1920s, American sources started recording Big Forty and Forty Thieves as alternative names, along with the early variant forms known as Twenty-Four Card Tableau, Twenty-Eight Card Tableau, Thirty-Two Card Tableau and Thirty-Six Card Tableau. (Note: For example, The Official Rules of Card Games (1922) and The New Hoyle (1929).) In 1939, the alternative name of Roosevelt at San Juan is first recorded by Coops. The game continues to feature in compilations of patiences and solitaires, "usually... under the name of Napoleon at St Helena". Arnold (2011) revives the name Le Cadran "to honour a different strand of history."

== Rules ==
The rules of Napoleon at St Helena are follows:

- Two decks are used (104 cards).
- Deal four rows of ten cards, face up and overlapping to form a tableau of ten columns with all cards visible.
- Leave space for eight foundations above the tableau.
- The player may only move the top card from any tableau column. The player may place any one card in an empty tableau space.
- The tableaus are built down by suit.
- The foundations are built up by suit, from ace to king.
- The player may take one card at a time from the stock and play to the tableau, the foundations, or to the wastepile.
- The player may use the top card from the wastepile.
- The player may only go through the stock once.
- The object of the game is to move all the cards to the foundations to form families built up from ace to king.

== Variants ==
Napoleon at St Helena forms the basis for several variant games, most of which make it easier to win. Common variations are: dealing the aces to the foundations at the start of the game, building the tableau down by alternating colour rather than by suit, and allowing cards built down on top of a tableau to be moved, as a sequence, together. Others include: allowing use of any card from the waste, dealing some of the tableau cards face down, and changing the number of tableau piles and/or the number of cards in each tableau.

=== Single-pack variants ===
Single-pack variants include the following games together with their key differences from Napoleon at St Helena:

- Canister: only one pack is used. Six rows of eight cards each are dealt and four cards to a seventh row overlapping the third to sixth cards. Packing is in alternating colour.
- Martha: only one pack is used and the Aces are extracted to the foundations before four rows of twelve cards are dealt, the first and third face down, the second and fourth face up. Packing is in alternating colours.
- Westcliff (American variant): one pack of cards is used. Three rows are dealt, the first two face down, the third face up. Packing is in alternating colours and sequences may be moved between depots.

=== Double-pack variants ===
Double-pack variants include the following games together with their odds of winning (Note: Based on Morehead & Mott-Smith (1949).) and key differences from Napoleon at St Helena:

- Deauville: The first three rows are dealt face down and cards are packed in alternating colour.
- Colonel: three rows of 12 cards each are dealt. Tableau cards may only be moved to a higher row.
- Emperor: the first three rows of ten cards are dealt face down, the fourth face up. Cards are packed down in alternating colour and, in the modern version, sequences may be transferred between tableau columns. The distinguishing feature is being able to worry back cards, singly, from the foundations to the tableau.
- Indian (1 in 2): three rows of ten cards each are dealt, the first face down. Cards are packed down on the tableau by any suit other than their own. For example, any 5 can be placed over the 6♥ except the 5♥.
- Josephine: cards of the same suit built down can be moved as a unit.
- Limited (1 in 5): three rows of twelve cards each are dealt.
- Lucas (1 in 3): the aces are removed and act as the foundations before 3 rows of thirteen cards each are dealt.
- Maria or Thirty-six Card Tableau (1 in 8): four rows of nine cards each are dealt; during play, the cards are built down by alternating colour.
- Midshipman: two rows of nine cards each are dealt face down and two more face up. Packing is in any suit except the card's own.
- Number Ten (1 in 10): the first two rows of ten cards each are dealt face down and the next two face up. Building is down by alternating colour and sequences can be moved as a unit.
- Octave: three rows of eight cards each are dealt, the first two face down and third face up. Packing is in alternate colours. After dealing, eight grace cards are dealt in a line below the tableau and may be used in play. (Note: Effectively a reserve.) If the game blocks, the next talon card may be used. If that cannot be played, the game is lost.
- Rank and File or Dress Parade (1 in 2): the first three rows are dealt face down and the top card of each is the only one exposed. Building is down alternating colour and sequences can be moved in part and in whole.
- Red and Black (5 in 6): there are eight columns built down by alternating colour.
- Streets: building on the tableau is down by alternating colour.

=== Triple-pack variant ===
There is also a triple-pack variant called Sixty Thieves in which twelve columns of five cards are dealt.

== Related games ==
Other closely related games include Congress, Diplomat, Napoleon's Square, Corona, and Blockade. Busy Aces is a simpler game that is also part of the family.

== See also ==
- List of patience and solitaire games
- Glossary of patience and solitaire terms

== Bibliography ==
- _ (1922). The Official Rules of Card Games: Hoyle Up-to-date. US Playing Card Co.
- Seymour, Paul H. (1929). The New Hoyle: Standard Games. Laidlaw Brothers, Chicago, New York.
- Arnold, Peter (2011). Card Games for One. 2nd edn. London: Chambers. ISBN 9780550102010
- Cadogan, Lady Adelaide (1874). Illustrated Games of Patience. London: Sampson Low, Marston, Low & Searle.
- Coops, Helen Leslie (1939). 100 Games of Solitaire. Whitman. 128 pp.
- Crépeau, Pierre (2001) [1st pub. 1999]. The Complete Book Of Solitaire. Translated by My-Trang Nguyen. Firefly Books (U.S.) Inc. pp. 258–260. ISBN 1-55209-597-5.
- Galt, David (1999). 101 Great Card Games, Publications International. ISBN 0-7853-4044-0
- Henshaw, Annie B. (1870). Amusements for Invalids. Boston: Loring.
- Kansil, Joli Quentin, ed. (1999). Bicycle Official Rules of Card Games. ISBN 1-889752-06-1
- Morehead, Albert H. and Mott-Smith, Geoffrey (1949). The Complete Book of Solitaire and Patience Games. New York: Grosset & Dunlop.
- Morehead, Philip D., ed. (2001) Hoyle's Rules of Games, 3rd edition. ISBN 0-451-20484-0
- Parlett, David (1979). The Penguin Book of Patience, London: Penguin. ISBN 0-7139-1193-X
