= Klondike (solitaire) =

Solitaire card game

- Solitaire game
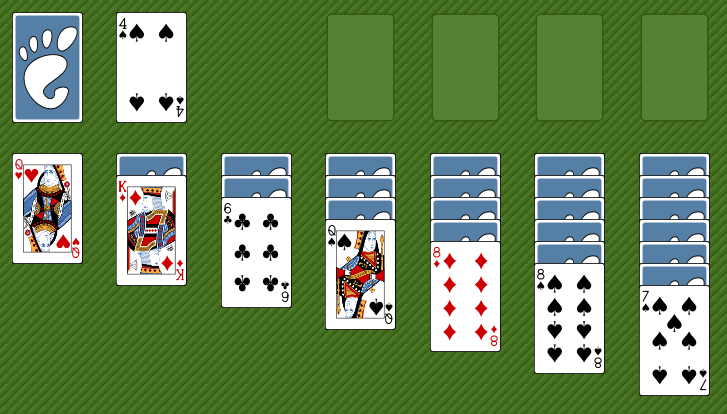
- Game setup
- Alternative names: Canfield, Solitaire, Patience, Seven up, Sevens
- Named variants: Agnes (Bernauer), Batsford, Easthaven, King Albert, Thumb and Pouch, Somerset or Usk, American Westcliff
- Type: Simple packer
- Family: Klondike
- Deck: Single 52-card
- Playing time: 10 min
- Odds of winning: 18% to 43%

Klondike is a card game for one player and the best known and most popular version of the solitaire family, as well as one of the most challenging in widespread play. It has spawned numerous variants including Batsford, Easthaven, King Albert, Thumb and Pouch, Somerset or Usk and Whitehead, as well as the American variants of the games, Agnes and Westcliff. The distinguishing feature of all variants is a triangular layout of the tableau, building in ascending sequence and packing in descending order.

== Name ==
In the U.S. and Canada, it is so well known that the term "Solitaire", in the absence of qualifiers, typically refers to Klondike. Equally in the UK, it is often just known as "Patience". Elsewhere the game is known as American Patience.

Historically, Klondike was also called Canfield in America, perhaps because it was a casino game at the Canfield Casino in Saratoga Springs, New York; this is the name by which it became known in England. Today, however, Canfield is more usually the American name for the patience game called "Demon" in England, which is a different game altogether. Likewise the rumour prevails that this other game was devised by Richard Canfield even though Canfield himself called his game "Klondike".

== History ==
The origins of the name Klondike are unknown; a handful of authors have speculated the name derives from the late 19th-century Klondike Gold Rush, but no material evidence substantiates such a claim. The earliest rules for the game known as Klondike today appear in the 1907 edition of Hoyle's Games under the name "Seven-Card Klondike". Hoyles calls it a simpler version of "Klondike", also described in the same book, but which turns out to be a gambling version of the game nowadays known as Canfield in the US and Demon elsewhere in the world.

In the 1913 edition of the so-called Official Rules of Card Games, (Note: As Parlett and others have pointed out, there is no such thing as 'official rules' for card games, except where there is a governing body for a particular game.) Seven-Card Klondike has become Klondike, with the modification that the pack is run through one card at a time instead of three, and the original Klondike is now being called Canfield.

Klondike's inclusion in Microsoft Windows in the 1990s in the form of Microsoft Solitaire contributed significantly to its current popularity. It is considered the most popular version of solitaire.

== Rules ==
Video demonstration of Klondike

Klondike is played with a standard 52 deck, minus the two Joker cards.

After shuffling, a tableau of seven fanned piles of cards is laid from left to right. From left to right, each pile contains one more card than the last. The first and left-most pile contains a single upturned card, the second pile contains two cards, and so forth. The topmost card of each pile is turned face up.

The remaining cards from the stock are placed face down at the upper left of the layout.

The four foundations (light rectangles in the upper right of the figure) are built up by suit from Ace (low in this game) to King, and the tableau piles can be built down by alternate colors. Every face-up card in a partial pile, or a complete pile, can be moved, as a unit, to another tableau pile on the basis of its highest card. Any empty piles can be filled with a King, or a pile of cards with a King. The aim of the game is to build up four stacks of cards starting with Ace and ending with King, all of the same suit, on one of the four foundations, at which time the player would have won.

There are different ways of dealing the remainder of the deck from the stock to the waste, including the following:

- Turning three cards at once to the waste, with no limit on passes through the deck.
- Turning three cards at once to the waste, with three passes through the deck.
- Turning one card at a time to the waste, with three passes through the deck.
- Turning one card at a time to the waste with only a single pass through the deck and playing it if possible.
- Turning one card at a time to the waste, with no limit on passes through the deck.

If the player can no longer make any meaningful moves, the game is considered lost.

== Probability of winning ==
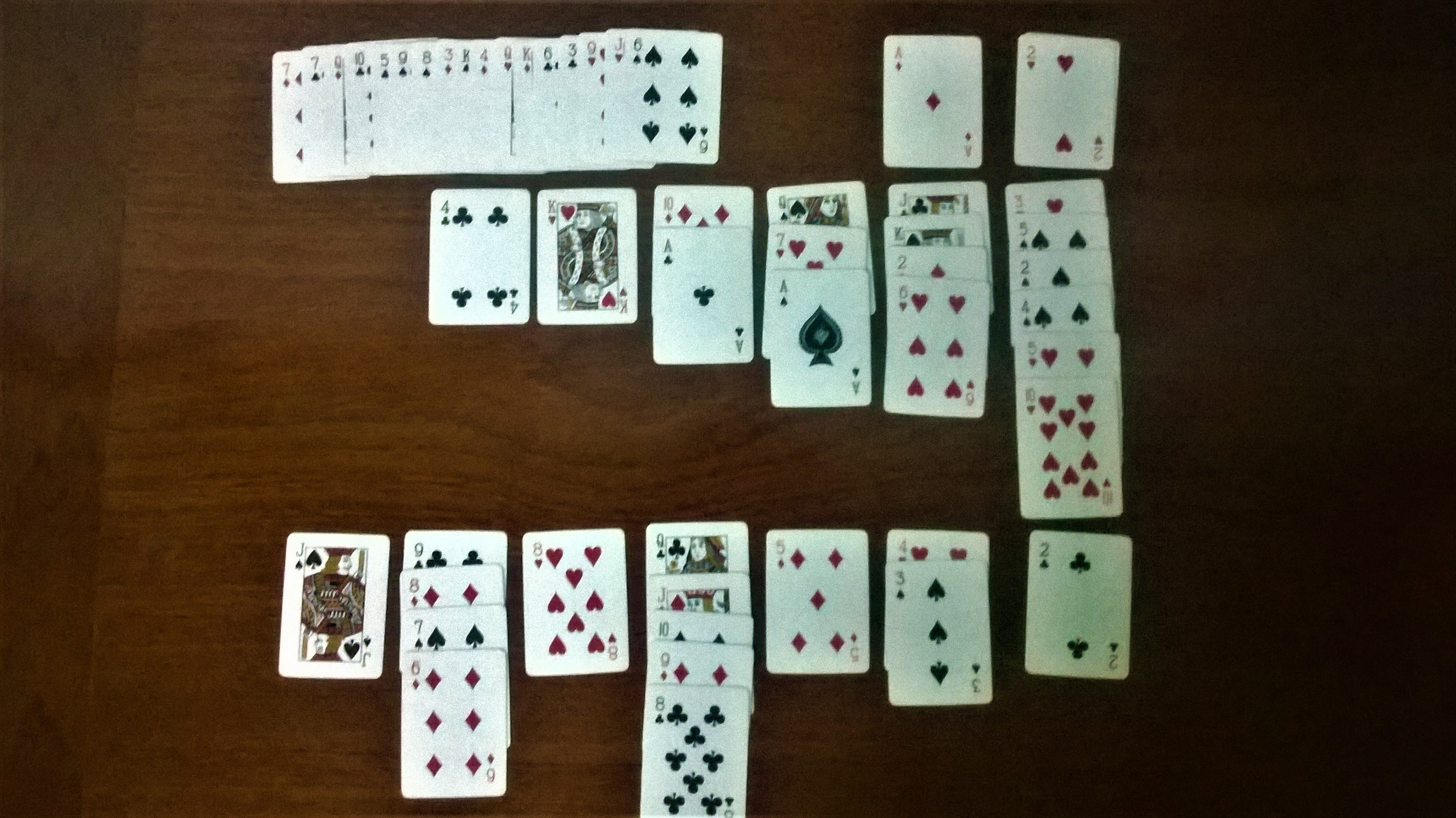
A lost game of Thoughtful Klondike (under draw three rules). The stock is shown at the upper-left. The upper section of the Tableau shows downturned cards, and the lower section shows the upturned cards. No cards can be moved except for two pointless moves: 2♥ from foundation to tableau, or 7♠ between tableau piles.

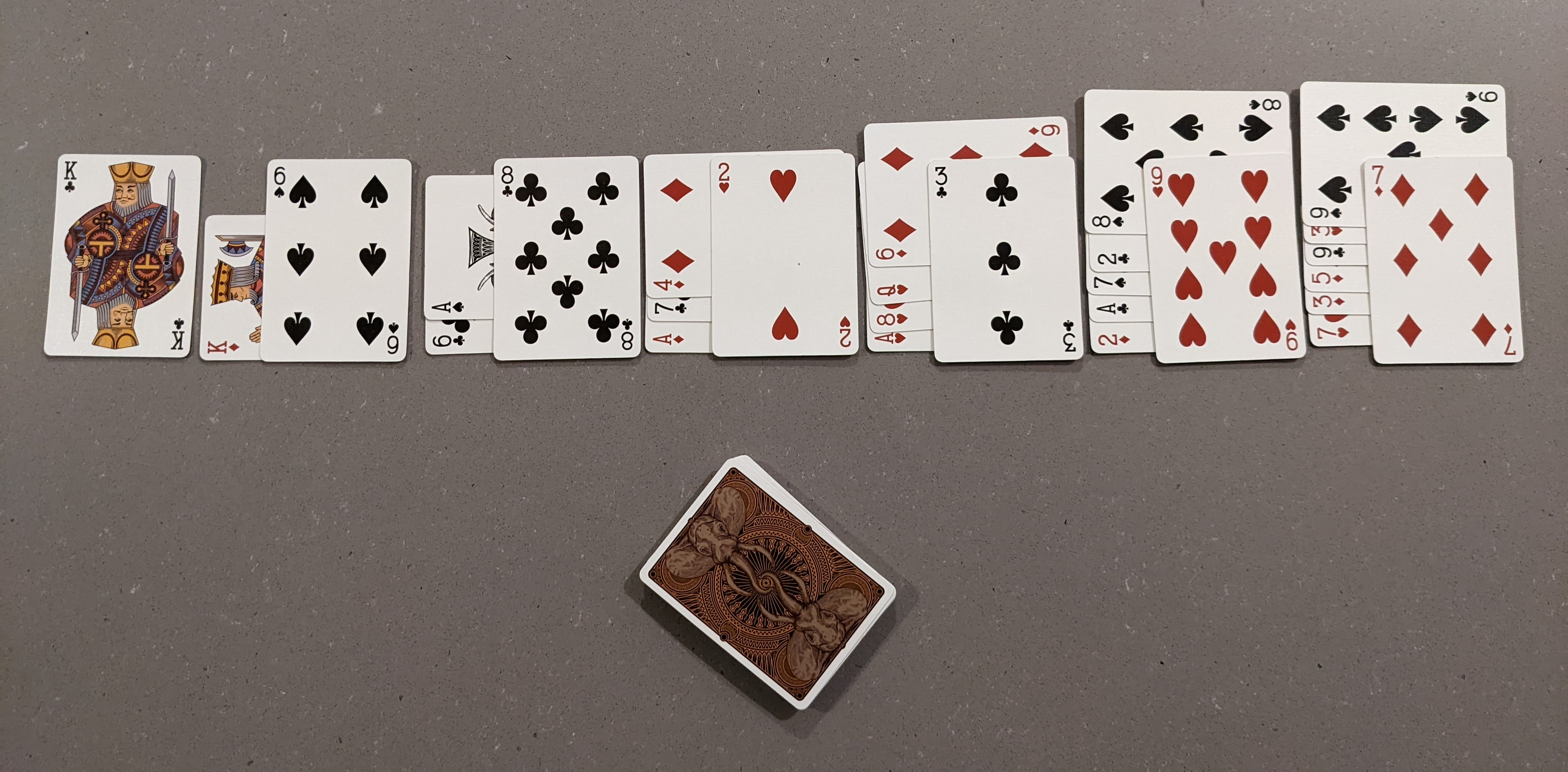
An alternate method for dealing a game of Thoughtful Klondike with physical cards. Across the top in the tableau the downturned cards are dealt sideways to discern them from the upturned cards. The stock is shown at the bottom. Full knowledge of card location allows the player to make informed decisions when multiple moves are possible.

The probability of being able to win a game of Klondike with best-possible play is not known, and the inability of theoreticians to precisely calculate these odds has been referred to by mathematician Persi Diaconis as "one of the embarrassments of applied probability".

An upper bound on the probability of winning can be found by considering a modified version of the game called "Thoughtful Solitaire" or "Thoughtful Klondike", in which the locations of all 52 cards are known. The probability of winning Thoughtful Klondike (with draw three rules) has been estimated at 81.942% ± 0.081%. However the probability of winning regular Klondike is smaller, because sometimes there is no way of knowing the correct move without being able to see the downturned cards.

For the most common variant (turn three cards, unlimited passes), a number of studies have been made. A Klondike-playing AI using Monte Carlo tree search was able to solve up to 35% of randomly generated games. Another algorithm has a winning rate of 52% in "turn one" mode, and 18% in "turn three". These results place a lower bound on the winnability percentage. One experiment found a skilled human player could win 189 out of 442 games (43%).

Hoyle's Rules of Games suggests the chances of winning as being 1 in 30 games, when there is only one pass through the deck.

== Variants ==
=== Single deck ===
Below are some single-pack variants of Klondike:

- Agnes (US variant): the stock is dealt in batches of seven on reserve piles and every one is available. Furthermore, the bases of the foundations depend on the twenty-ninth card, which is dealt on the foundations.
- Easthaven (less commonly Aces Up, (Note: But not to be confused with Aces Up which is a different patience, see Parlett and Morehead & Mott-Smith.)) twenty-one cards are dealt into seven piles of three, two face-down and one face-up. A space in this game may only be filled by a king or sequence starting with a king (several rule sets simplify this and allow any card or sequence to be moved to a vacancy), and when a play goes to a standstill, seven new cards are dealt to the tableau, one top of each pile. Easthaven may be played with 2 or 3 decks. The two-deck version is either called Double Easthaven or Gypsy.
- Nine Across: nine columns of cards are dealt, as opposed to seven in classic Klondike. The player can choose which cards to form the foundations; if one or more eights are exposed, for example, the player may decide to build on eights, and the piles are built up 8-9-10-J-Q-K-Ace-2-3-4-5-6-7. If eights are built on, sevens fill up spaces and so forth. The stock is dealt through one by one as many times as required.
- Somerset or Usk: as Klondike but all the cards are dealt out: 10 in the first row, 9 in the second, and so on until there are 3 in the last.
- Thumb and Pouch: a card in the tableau can be built upon another that is any suit other than its own (e.g. spades cannot be placed over spades) and spaces can be filled by any card or sequence.
- Whitehead: all cards are dealt face up, building is by color (red on red, black on black), a sequence made up of cards that are of the same suit can be moved as a unit, and a space can be filled by any card or sequence.
- Westcliff (US variant): thirty cards are dealt into ten piles of three cards, two face down and one face up. A space in this game can be filled with any card or sequence.
- Kuipers: as Klondike but with eight columns instead of seven, turning one card at a time to the waste, with no limit on passes through the deck.

=== Gambling variant ===
In some casinos, Klondike is turned into a gambling game, by playing with the rule of dealing cards one at a time and going through the stock once. For example, a player would pay $50 to play, and the house would pay $5 for each card played to the foundations. This form of Klondike is sometimes called Las Vegas Solitaire.

=== Joker Solitaire ===
Joker Solitaire is a variant of Klondike created by Joli Quentin Kansil which adds two jokers that serve as limited wild cards.

=== Double Solitaire ===
Klondike has been turned into a two-player game under the name Double Solitaire. Players have their own packs and may not play to each other's tableaus but share their foundations. Players take turns until they are unable to play a card from their talons. The first player to play all 52 cards is the winner. Informally, "Double" Solitaire can be played as a party game with more than 2 players.

== Computerized versions ==
Digital versions of Klondike have helped popularize the game and offer advantages over playing with a physical deck. Notable examples of computerized versions include:

- A software version of Klondike named simply Solitaire has been a regular inclusion in the Microsoft Windows operating system, beginning with Windows 3.0 in 1990. Initially Microsoft included the game as both a diversion and a teaching tool: for many users, Solitaire was their first introduction to using a computer mouse. Microsoft officials stated in 1994 that "for years, Solitaire was the most-used application for Windows".
- In 1981, the Atari Program Exchange published Mark Reid's implementation of Klondike for Atari 8-bit computers, simply titled Solitaire.
- Michael A. Casteel's shareware version of Klondike for the Macintosh was first released in 1984, and has been continually updated since.
- Klondike was added to Nintendo's Clubhouse Games series of tabletop game compilations.

Scoring in the Microsoft Windows Solitaire version of Klondike is as follows:

| Move | Points |
|---|---|
| Waste to Tableau | 5 |
| Waste to Foundation | 10 |
| Tableau to Foundation | 10 |
| Turn over Tableau card | 5 |
| Foundation to Tableau | −15 |
| Recycle waste when playing by ones | −100 (minimum score is 0) |

Moving cards directly from the Waste stack to a Foundation scores 10 points. However, if the card is first moved to a Tableau, and then to a Foundation, an extra 5 points are scored making a total of 15. Thus, to score the most points, no cards should be moved directly from the Waste to Foundation.

Time also plays a role, if the 'Timed game' option is selected. In this case, 2 points are deducted every 10 seconds. Bonus points are scored using the formula 700,000 ÷ (seconds to finish), if the game takes at least 30 seconds. If the game takes under 30 seconds, no bonus points are awarded.

== See also ==
- FreeCell
- List of solitaires
- Glossary of solitaire
- Solitaire

== Literature ==
- Arnold, Peter (2011). Card Games for One. Chambers.
- Coops, Helen Leslie (1939). 100 Games of Solitaire. Whitman. 128 pp.
- Morehead, Albert and Geoffrey Mott-Smith (2001). The Complete Book of Solitaire and Patience. Foulsham, Slough.
- Parlett, David (1979). The Penguin Book of Patience. London: Penguin. ISBN 978-0-7139-1193-0.
- Parlett, David (1991). A History of Card Games. Oxford, England: Oxford University Press. ISBN 0-19-282905-X.
