= Backbone (disambiguation) =

Backbone may refer to:

- Spinal column, core part of the axial skeleton in vertebrate animals

== Arts, entertainment, and media ==
=== Film ===
- Backbone (1923 film), a 1923 lost silent film starring Alfred Lunt
- Backbone (1975 film), a 1975 Yugoslavian drama directed by Vlatko Gilić

=== Music ===
==== Albums ====
- Backbones (album), a 2004 Wishbone Ash compilation album
- Backbone (Backbone album), 1998
- Backbone (Boney James album), 1993
- Backbone (Roam album), 2016
- Backbone (Anthony Callea album), 2016
- Backbone (Status Quo album), 2019
- Backbone (Kasey Chambers album), 2024

==== Songs ====
- "At the End of the Day / Backbone", 1993 song by Baby Animals
- "Backbone", 2005 song by Gojira from the album From Mars to Sirius
- "Backbone" (Chase & Status and Stormzy song), 2024 song by Chase & Status and Stormzy
- "Backbone" (Daughtry song), 2018 song by American rock band Daughtry

==== Other music ====
- Backbone, a rock band led by former Grateful Dead drummer Bill Kreutzmann

=== Other arts, entertainment, and media ===
- Backbone (solitaire), a solitaire game
- Backbone (magazine), a Canadian business magazine
- Backbone One (gaming device), a hardware and software platform
- Tails Noir, a 2021 indie video game known as Backbone until 2023
- Backbone Entertainment, a video game development company

== Places ==
- European backbone, or "Blue Banana", a geographic corridor of urbanisation in Western Europe
- Backbone State Park, oldest state park in Iowa, US

== Science and technology ==
- Backbone chain, in polymer chemistry, the framework of the molecule
- Backbone network, the top level of a hierarchical computer network
- Internet backbone, principal data routes between interconnected networks and core routers in the Internet
- Backbone.js, a JavaScript library used to build applications

== Other uses ==
- Backbone (British radio communications network)
