= Western Canadian Select =

North American heavy crude oil stream

Western Canadian Select (WCS) is a heavy sour blend of crude oil that is one of North America's largest heavy crude oil streams and, historically, its cheapest. It was established in December 2004 as a new heavy oil stream by EnCana (now Cenovus), Canadian Natural Resources, Petro-Canada (now Suncor) and Talisman Energy (now Repsol Oil & Gas Canada). It is composed mostly of bitumen blended with sweet synthetic and condensate diluents and 21 existing streams of both conventional and unconventional Alberta heavy crude oils at the large Husky Midstream General Partnership terminal in Hardisty, Alberta. Western Canadian Select—the benchmark for heavy, acidic (TAN <1.1) crudes—is one of many petroleum products from the Western Canadian Sedimentary Basin oil sands. Calgary-based Husky Energy, now a subsidiary of Cenovus, had joined the initial four founders in 2015.

Western Canadian Select (WCS) is the benchmark price for western Canadian crude blends. The price of other Canadian crude blends produced locally are also based on the price of the benchmark.

During the COVID-19 pandemic, many oil benchmarks around the world fell to record lows. WCS dropped to $3.81 U.S. dollars per barrel on April 21, 2020. In June, Cenovus increased production at its Christina Lake oil sands project reaching record volumes of 405,658 bbls/d when the price of WCS increased "almost tenfold from April" to an average of $33.97 or C$46.03 per barrel (bbl). During the 2022 Russian invasion of Ukraine, the price of WCS rose to over US$100 a barrel with the United States considering placing a ban on Russian oil imports. In June, the Western Canadian Select (WCS) benchmark price averaged $64.35 per barrel, which was closely aligned with the year-to-date (YTD) average of $63.09. During the 2025 United States trade war with Canada, the price dropped to C$52.57 per barrel (bbl) as of April 7.

In 2023, Canada's total oil exports reached a "historical high" of 4.8 million bpd, with the United States purchasing 192.9 million metric tons that year. In 2023, oil sands extraction contributed over CA$38 billion (1.74% of GDP) and conventional crude oil and gas extraction contributed CA$33 billion (1.52% of GDP) to Canada's economy.

In November 2024, the Canadian Association of Energy Contractors (CAOEC) forecasted that a total of 6,604 wells would be drilled in Western Canada in 2025, marking a 7.3% increase from 2023. This level of activity would be the highest in the Western Canadian oil sector since the commodity price downturn of 2014-2015, which resulted in a prolonged period of industry contraction.

== Overview ==
As of October 2026, due to a number of factors, including ample heavy crude supplies, rising tanker rates, increased Venezuelan competition, and regional refinery maintenance Western Canadian Select (WCS) trades at a volume-weighted discount of approximately $23.50 per barrel below the benchmark on the U.S. Gulf Coast.

Western Canadian Select is Canada's benchmark heavy crude and has historically been the cheapest crude oil heavy sour blend in North America. As of 2024, there are only three corporations—Suncor, CNRL, and Cenovus, all Canadian and all headquartered in Calgary—that produce an estimated 77% of all Canadian oilsands production. Repsol, which was the fourth main WCS producer, was one of many foreign companies and investors who exited the oilsands in 2024.

Canada is the primary supplier of total petroleum to the United States. In 2024, Canada's oil exports to the United States were increased substantially partly because of the increased capacity with the completion of the Trans Mountain expansion pipeline. In July and September 2024, Canada exported over 4.3 million barrels of oil per day (b/d) to the United States. In comparison, Canada exported 3.2 million b/d of crude oil to the United States in May 2020.

WCS's influence over the crude oil market extends beyond the production of these three corporate giants, as the price of other Canadian crude blends produced locally are also based on the price of the benchmark, WCS, according to NE2, a brokerage and exchange company that handles approximately 38 percent of western Canadian oil production.

The calculation of the price of WCS is complex. Because WCS is a lower quality heavy crude oil and is also farther from the major oil markets in the United States, its price is calculated based on a discount to West Texas Intermediate (WTI)—a sweeter, lighter oil, which is produced in the heart of the oil markets regions. WTI is the benchmark price of oil in North America. The price of WTI changes from day to day but actual commodities trading market for crude oil is based on contract prices, not a daily price. The WCS discount on a futures contract for a two-month period is based on the average price of all WTI contracts in the most recent month prior to the WCS contract agreement.

== Major producers ==
In 2004, Suncor Energy, Cenovus Energy, Canadian Natural Resources, and Talisman Energy (later Repsol) developed the Western Canadian Select (WCS) blend. According to Argus, in 2012 the WCS blend was still produced by only four companies because of the complex set of rules regarding compensate for contributions to the WCS blend. In October 2020, Cenovus acquired Husky, as Calgary-based company established in the 1930s for CA$3.8 billion. and completed a merger by January 2021, with the company operating under Cenovus making Cenovus the third-largest crude oil and natural gas company and the second-largest upgrader in Canada.

== Major importers ==
The United States imports about 99% of Canada's oil exports, According to monthly data provided by the U.S. Energy Information Administration (EIA), Canada is the "largest exporter of total petroleum" to the United States with crude oil exports to the US of 3,026,000 bpd in September 2014, 3,789,000 bpd in September 2015 and 3,401,000 bpd in October 2015.

Canadian oil is much cheaper than oil from other sources. Since 2009, US refineries have increased use of Canadian crude oil, according to a March 20, 2020 report Since 2009, the US has decreased oil imports from Saudi Arabia, Mexico, and Venezuela. Of the total crude oil imports to the US, crude oil from Canada accounts for 56%, according to a 2019 EIA report.

Canada's total oil exports reached a "historical high" of 4.8 million bpd in 2023, with the United States purchasing 192.9 million metric tons that year.

== Historical pricing ==
Crude prices are typically quoted at a particular location. Unless stated otherwise, the price of WCS is quoted at Hardisty and the price of West Texas Intermediate (WTI) is quoted at Cushing, Oklahoma.

Statista provides accurate current and historical records of the price of WCS.

By March 18, 2015, the price of benchmark crude oils, WTI had dropped to $US 43.34/barrel (bbl). from a high in June 2014 with WTI priced above US$107/bbl and Brent above US$115/bbl. WCS, a bitumen-derived crude, is a heavy crude that is similar to Californian heavy crudes, Mexico's Maya crude or Venezuelan heavy crude oils. On March 15, 2015, the differential between WTI and WCS was US$13.8. Western Canadian Select was among the cheapest crude oils in the world with a price of US$29.54/bbl on March 15, 2015, its lowest price since April 2009. By mid-April 2015 WCS had risen almost fifty percent to trade at $US44.94.

By June 2, 2015, the differential between WTI and WCS was US$7.8, the lowest it had ever been. By August 12, 2015, the WCS price dropped to $23.31 and the WTI/WCS differential had risen to $19.75, the lowest price in nine years when BP temporarily shut down its Whiting, Indiana refinery for two weeks, the sixth largest refinery in the United States, to repair the largest crude distillation unit at its Whiting, Indiana refinery. At the same time Enbridge was forced to shut down Line 55 Spearhead pipeline and Line 59 Flanagan South pipeline in Missouri because of a crude oil leak. By September 9, 2015, the price of WCS was US$32.52.

By December 14, 2015, with the price of WTI at $35 a barrel, WCS fell "75 percent to $21.82," the lowest in seven years and Mexico's Maya heavy crude was down "73 percent in 18 months to $27.74". By December 2015 the price of WCS was US$23.46, the lowest price since December 2008 and The WTI-WCS differential was US$13.65. In mid-December 2015, when the price of both Brent and WTI was about $35 a barrel and WCS was $21.82. Mexico's comparable heavy sour crude, Maya dropped in price 73% but the Mexican government used an oil hedge to "somewhat protect" it.

By February 2016 WTI had dropped to US$29.85 and WCS was US$14.10 with a differential of $15.75. By June 2016 WTI was priced at US$46.09, Brent at MYMEX was US$47.39 and WCS was US$33.94 with a differential of US$12.15. By June 2016 the price of WCS was US$33.94. By December 10, 2016, WTI had risen to US$51.46 and WCS was US$36.11 with a differential of $15.35.

On June 28, 2018, WTI spiked to US$74, a four-year high, then dropped by 30% by the end of November.

In November 2018, the price of WCS hit its record low of less than US$14 a barrel. From 2008 through 2018, WCS sold at an average discount of US$17 against WTI. In the fall of 2018, the differential increased to a record of around US$50. On December 2, Premier Rachel Notley announced a mandatory cut of 8.7% in Alberta's oil production. This represents cutting back 325,000 bpd in January 2019, and dropping to 95,000 bpd by the end of 2019. According to a December 12, 2018 article in the Financial Post, after the mandatory cuts were announced, the price of WCS rose c. 70% to c. US$41 a barrel with the WTI narrowing to c. US$11. The price difference between WCS and WTI was as wide as US$50 a barrel in October. As the international price of oil recovered from the December "sharp downturn", the price of WCS rose to US$28.60. According to CBC News, the lower global price of oil was related to declining economic growth as the China–U.S. trade war continued. The price rose as oil production was cut back by the Organization of Petroleum Exporting Countries (OPEC) and Saudi Arabia. According to the U.S. Energy Information Administration (EIA) report, oil production rose by 12% in the U.S., primarily because of shale oil. As a result, Goldman Sachs lowered its 2019 oil price forecast for 2019.

In March 2019, the differential of WTI over WCS decreased to $US9.94 as the price of WTI dropped to US$58.15 a barrel, which is 7.5% lower than it was in March 2018, while the price of WCS averaged increased to US$48.21 a barrel which is 35.7% higher than in March 2018. By October 2019, WTI was averaging US$53.96 a barrel which is 23.7% lower than in October 2018. In comparison, for the same period, WCS averaged US$41.96 a barrel which is 2.0% higher than in October 2018 with a differential of US$12.00 in October 2019.

By March 30, 2020, the price of WCS bitumen-blend crude was US$3.82 per barrel. In April 2020 the price briefly fell below zero, along with WTI, due to collapsing demand caused by the COVID-19 pandemic.

In June, the Western Canadian Select (WCS) benchmark price averaged $64.35 per barrel, which was closely aligned with the year-to-date (YTD) average of $63.09.

After President Donald Trump announced tariffs came into effect on April 3, as part of the 2025 - 2026 United States trade war with Canada, the price of WCS dropped to C$52.57 per barrel (bbl).

== Curtailment ==
In the fall of 2018, the differential between WCS and WTI—which had averaged at US$17 for the decade from 2008 to 2018—widened to a record of around US$50. By December 2018 the price of WCS had plummeted to US$5.90. In response, the NDP government under Premier Notley, set temporary production limits of 3.56 million barrels per day (b/d) that came into effect on January 1, 2019. The curtailment was deemed necessary because of chronic pipeline bottlenecks out of Western Canada which cost the "industry and governments millions of dollars a day in lost revenue". Following the December 2 announcement of mandatory oil production cutbacks in Alberta, the price of WCS rose to US$26.65 a barrel. The global price of oil dropped dramatically in December before recovering in January. The price of WCS increased to US$28.60 with WTI at US$48.69. In the fall of 2019, the UCP government under Premier Kenney "extended the curtailment program into 2020 and increased the base exemptions for companies before the quotas kick in, lowering the number of producers affected by curtailment to 16".

Curtailment "supported domestic oil prices" but also "limited growth and overall industry investment as companies have been unable to expand production above their mandated quotas".

Integrated producers, such as Imperial Oil and Husky Energy, oppose curtailment because when the price of WCS is low, their refineries in the United States benefit. Other oil producers in Alberta support curtailment as a way of preventing the collapse of WCS.

In the summer of 2019, Suncor Energy, Cenovus Energy and Canadian Natural Resources agreed to increase production with the mandatory use of oil-by-rail as a condition for the increase.

== Characteristics ==
"The extremely viscous oil contained in oil sands deposits is commonly referred to as bitumen." (CAS 8052-42-4) At the Husky Hardisty terminal, Western Canadian Select is blended from sweet synthetic and condensate diluents from 25 existing Canadian heavy conventional and unconventional bitumen crude oils.

Western Canadian Select's characteristics are described as follows: API gravity level of between 19 and 22 (API), density (kg/m3) 930.1, MCR (Wt%) 9.6, sulphur (Wt%) 2.8-3.5%, TAN (Total Acid number) of (Mg KOH/g) 0.93.

Refiners in North America consider a crude with a TAN value greater than 1.1 as "high-TAN". A refinery must be retrofitted in order to handle high TAN crudes. Thus, a high TAN crude is limited in terms of the refineries in North America that are able to process it. For this reason, the TAN value of WCS is consistently maintained under 1.1 through blending with light, sweet crudes and condensate. Certain other bitumen blends, such as Access Western Blend and Seal Heavy Blend, have higher TAN values and are considered high TAN.

"Oil sands crude oil does not flow naturally in pipelines because it is too dense. A diluent is normally blended with the oil sands bitumen to allow it to flow in pipelines. For the purpose of meeting pipeline viscosity and density specifications, oil sands bitumen is blended with either synthetic crude oil (synbit) and/or condensate (Dilbit)." WCS may be referred to as a syndilbit, since it may contain both synbit and dilbit.

In a study commissioned by the U.S. Department of State (DOS), regarding the Environmental Impact Statement (EIS) for the Keystone XL pipeline project, the DOS assumes "that the average crude oil flowing through the pipeline would consist of about 50% Western Canadian Select (dilbit) and 50% Suncor Synthetic A (SCO)".

The Canadian Society of Unconventional Resources (CSUR) identifies four types of oil: conventional oil, tight oil, oil shale, and heavy oil like WCS.

== Volumes ==
By September 2014 Canada was exporting 3,026,000 bpd to the United States. This increased to its peak of 3,789,000 bpd in September 2015 and 3,401,000 bpd in October 2015, which represents 99% of Canadian petroleum exports. Threshold volumes of WCS in 2010 were only approximately 250,000 b/d.

On May 1, 2016, a devastating wildfire ignited and swept through Fort McMurray, resulting in the largest wildfire evacuation in Albertan history. As the fires progressed north of Fort McMurray, "oil sands production companies operating near Fort McMurray either shut down completely or operated at reduced rates". By June 8, 2016, the U.S. Department of Energy estimated that "disruptions to oil production averaged about 0.8 million b/d in May, with a daily peak of more than 1.1 million b/d. Although projects are slowly restarting as fires subside, it may take weeks for production to return to previous levels." The Fort McMurray fires did not significantly affect the price of WCS.

"According to EIA's February Short-Term Energy Outlook, production of petroleum and other liquids in Canada, which totaled 4.5 million barrels per day (b/d) in 2015, is expected to average 4.6 million b/d in 2016 and 4.8 million b/d in 2017. This increase is driven by growth in oil sands production of about 300,000 b/d by the end of 2017, which is partially offset by a decline in conventional oil production." The EIA claims that while oil sands projects may be operating at a loss, these projects are able to "withstand volatility in crude oil prices". It would cost more to shut a project down—from $500 million to $1 billion than to operate at a loss.

== Price of crude oil ==
The National Bank of Canada's Tim Simard, argued that WCS is the benchmark for those buying shares in Canadian oil sands companies, such as Canadian Natural Resources, Cenovus Energy Northern Blizzard Resources, Pengrowth Energy, or Twin Butte Energy or others where a "big part of their exposure will be to heavy crude”.

The price of Western Canadian Select (WCS) crude oil (petroleum) per barrel suffers a differential against West Texas Intermediate (WTI) as traded on the New York Mercantile Exchange (NYMEX) as published by Bloomberg Media, which itself has a discount versus London-traded Brent oil. This is based on data on prices and differentials from Canadian Natural Resources (TSX:CNQ)(NYSE:CNQ).

=== Crude oil differentials and Western Canadian Select (WCS) ===
In a 2013 white paper for the Bank of Canada, authors Alquist and Guénette examined implications for high global oil prices for the North American market. They argued that North America was experiencing a crude oil inventory surplus. This surplus combined with the "segmentation of the North American crude oil market from the global market", contributed to "the divergence between continental benchmark crudes such as WTI and Western Canada Select (WCS) and seaborne benchmark crudes such as Brent".

Alberta's Minister of Finance argues that WCS "should be trading on par with Mayan crude at about $94 a barrel". Maya crudes are close to WCS quality levels. However, Maya was trading at US$108.73/bbl in February 2013, while WCS was US$69/bbl. In his presentation to the U.S. Energy Information Administration (EIA) in 2013 John Foran demonstrated that Maya had traded at only a slight premium to WCS in 2010. Since then WCS price differentials widened "with rising oil sands and tight oil production and insufficient pipeline capacity to access global markets". Mexico enjoys a location discount with its proximity to the heavy oil-capable refineries in the Gulf Coast. As well, Mexico began to strategically and successfully seek out joint venture refinery partnerships in the 1990s to create a market for its heavy crude oil in the U.S. Gulf. In 1993, (Petróleos Mexicanos, the state-owned Mexican oil company) and Shell Oil Company agreed on a joint US$1 billion refinery upgrading construction project which led to the construction of a new coker, hydrotreating unit, sulphur recovery unit and other facilities in Deer Park, Texas on the Houston Ship Channel in order to process large volumes of PEMEX heavy Maya crude while fulfilling the U.S. Clean Air Act requirements.

Year	2007	2008	2009	2010	2011	2012	2013-02	2013-04-24	2013-08	2013-12	2014-01	2014-04	2014-12	2015-06
Brent US$/bbl	73	98	62	80	112	112	118	103.41	110					US$64.88/bbl
WTI US$/bbl	72	100 peak:147	62	80	95	95	95	93.29	97.90			102.07	US$54.13/bbl)	US$60.19/bbl
WCS US$/bbl		80	52	65	78	72	69	77.62	82.36	67		$79.56	US$38.13/bbl	US$52.39/bbl
Syncrude Sweet	62	102	62	78	104	93	97	98.51						
Edmonton Par	72	96	58	75	96	86	87	89.53						
Maya US$/bbl							101		2013-12	87				

(Prices except Maya for years 2007-February 2013)(Prices for Maya) (Prices for April 24, 2013).

By July 2013, Western Canadian Select (WCS) "heavy oil prices climbed from US$75 to more than US$90 per barrel—the highest level since mid-2008, when WTI oil prices were at a record (US$147.90)—just prior to the 2008-09 'Great Recession'". WCS' heavy oil prices were "expected to remain at the US$90, which is closer to the world price for heavy crude and WCS 'true, inherent value'". The higher price of WCS oil off WTI was explained by "new rail shipments alleviating some export pipeline constraints — and the return of WTI oil prices to international levels".

By January 2014 there was a proliferation of trains and pipelines carrying WCS along with an increased demand on the part of U.S. refineries. By early 2014 there were approximately 150,000 bpd of heavy oil being transported by rail.

According to the Government of Alberta's June 2014 Energy Prices report the price of WCS rose 15% from $68.87 in April 2013 to $79.56 in April 2014 but experienced a low of $58 and a high of $91. During the same time period the price of the benchmark West Texas Intermediate (WTI) rose 10.9% averaging $102.07 a barrel in April 2014.

In April 2020, the price of WTI was $16.55 and the price of WCS was $3.50 with a differential of -$13.05. In June the price of WTI was $38.31 and WCS $33.97, with a differential of -$4.34.

== Transport ==
=== Pipelines ===
According to the Oil Sands Magazine, as of March 31, 2020, Western Canadian crude oil export pipelines—Trans Mountain Corporation, TC Energy, Enbridge, and Plains All American Canada—have a total estimated export capacity of 4,230,000 b/d.

Heavy discounts on Albertan crudes in 2012 were falsely attributed to crudes being "landlocked" in the U.S. Midwest. Since that time, several major pipelines have been constructed to release that glut, including Seaway, the Southern leg of Keystone XL and Flanagan South. At the same time Enbridge was forced to shut down Line 55 Spearhead pipeline and Line 59 Flanagan South pipeline in Missouri because of a crude oil leak.

However, significant obstacles persist in approvals on pipelines to export crude from Alberta. In April 2013, Calgary-based Canada West Foundation warned that Alberta is "running up against a [pipeline capacity] wall around 2016, when we will have barrels of oil we can't move". For the time being, rail shipments of crude oil have filled the gap and narrowed the price differential between Albertan and North American crudes. However, additional pipelines exporting crude from Alberta will be required to support ongoing expansion in crude production.

==== Trans Mountain Pipeline System ====
The Trans Mountain Pipeline System, which has transported liquid fuels since 1953, was purchased from the Canadian division of Kinder Morgan Energy Partners, by the Canada Development Investment Corporation (CDIC)'s Trans Mountain Corporation. The Trans Mountain Pipeline is the only pipeline that carries Albertan crude and refined oil to the British Columbia Coast. The CDIC, which is accountable to the Parliament of Canada, is in charge of the pipeline system and the Trans Mountain Expansion Project (TMX).

===== Keystone Pipeline System =====
2012 proposed route of Keystone XL pipeline, since revised

TC Energy's Keystone Pipeline System is an oil pipeline system in Canada and the United States that was commissioned in 2010. It runs from the Western Canadian Sedimentary Basin in Alberta to refineries in Illinois and Texas, and also to oil tank farms and an oil pipeline distribution center in Cushing, Oklahoma.

Frustrated by delays in getting approval for Keystone XL (via the US Gulf of Mexico), the Northern Gateway Project (via Kitimat, BC) and the expansion of the existing Trans Mountain line to Vancouver, British Columbia, Alberta intensified exploration of two northern projects "to help the province get its oil to tidewater, making it available for export to overseas markets". Canadian Prime Minister Stephen Harper, spent $9 million by May 2012 and $16.5 million by May 2013 to promote Keystone XL.

In the United States, Democrats are concerned that Keystone XL would simply facilitate getting Alberta oil sands products to tidewater for export to China and other countries via the American Gulf Coast of Mexico.

The project was rejected by the Obama administration on November 6, 2015, "over environmental concerns". It was revived by Presidential executive order on January 24, 2017, by President Donald Trump. which "would transport more than 800,000 barrels per day of heavy crude" from Alberta to the Gulf Coast.

On March 31, 2020, TC Energy's CEO Russ Girling said that construction of the Keystone XL Pipeline would resume, following Alberta's Premier, Jason Kenney's announcement that the UCP government was taking an "equity stake" and providing a "loan guarantee", which amounts to a "total financial commitment of just over $7 billion" to the Keystone XL project. On January 20, 2021, President Joe Biden revoked the permit for the pipeline on his first day in office fulfilling a long-time promise.

===== Energy East pipeline =====
The Energy East pipeline was a proposed pipeline project announced on August 1, 2013, by TransCanada CEO Russ Girling. The $12 billion 4,400-kilometre (2,700 mile) pipeline project was canceled by TransCanada in 2017.

==== Enbridge Pipeline System ====
Enbridge, which operates in North America, has the longest crude oil transportation system in the continent.

Enbridge Northern Gateway Pipelines, which was first announced in 2006, would have transported heavy crude oil from Athabasca to Kitimat, British Columbia.

Under Prime Minister of Canada Justin Trudeau, Bill C-48, the Oil Tanker Moratorium Act which came into effect on June 21, 2019 imposed a ban on oil tanker traffic on the north coast of British Columbia, which made the Enbridge Northern Gateway Pipelines.

Enbridge owns and operates the Alberta Clipper pipeline—Line 67—part of the Enbridge Pipeline System, which has been running from Hardisty, Alberta to Superior, Wisconsin, in the United States since 2010, connecting the oil sands production area with the existing network.

Enbridge reversed the flow direction of the Seaway pipeline to originate in Cushing, transporting WCS to Freeport, Texas, on May 17, 2012, which caused a price increase in WCS. With the opening of Enbridge's major pipeline Seaway—the Southern leg of Keystone XL and Flanagan South Line 59 in Missouri in 2015, some of the "bottleneck" was relieved. In April 2015, Enbridge filled a "new 570,000-barrel-a-day pipeline".

By March 2020, Cenovus Energy has committed to 75,000 barrels a day in long-term contracts with Enbridge to ship via Mainline and Flanagan South systems to Texas. As of March 30, 2020, the price oil producers pay to transport heavy oil to Texas through Enbridge pipelines, is US$7 to US$9 a barrel. At that time, the price of WCS a barrel was US$3.82 per barrel.

==== Plains All American Pipeline ====
The 16.5 km long Milk River and the 0.75 km Rangeland pipelines are owned and operated by the Texas-headquartered Plains All American Pipeline. The Milk River pipeline transports 97,900 bbl/day.

=== Rail ===
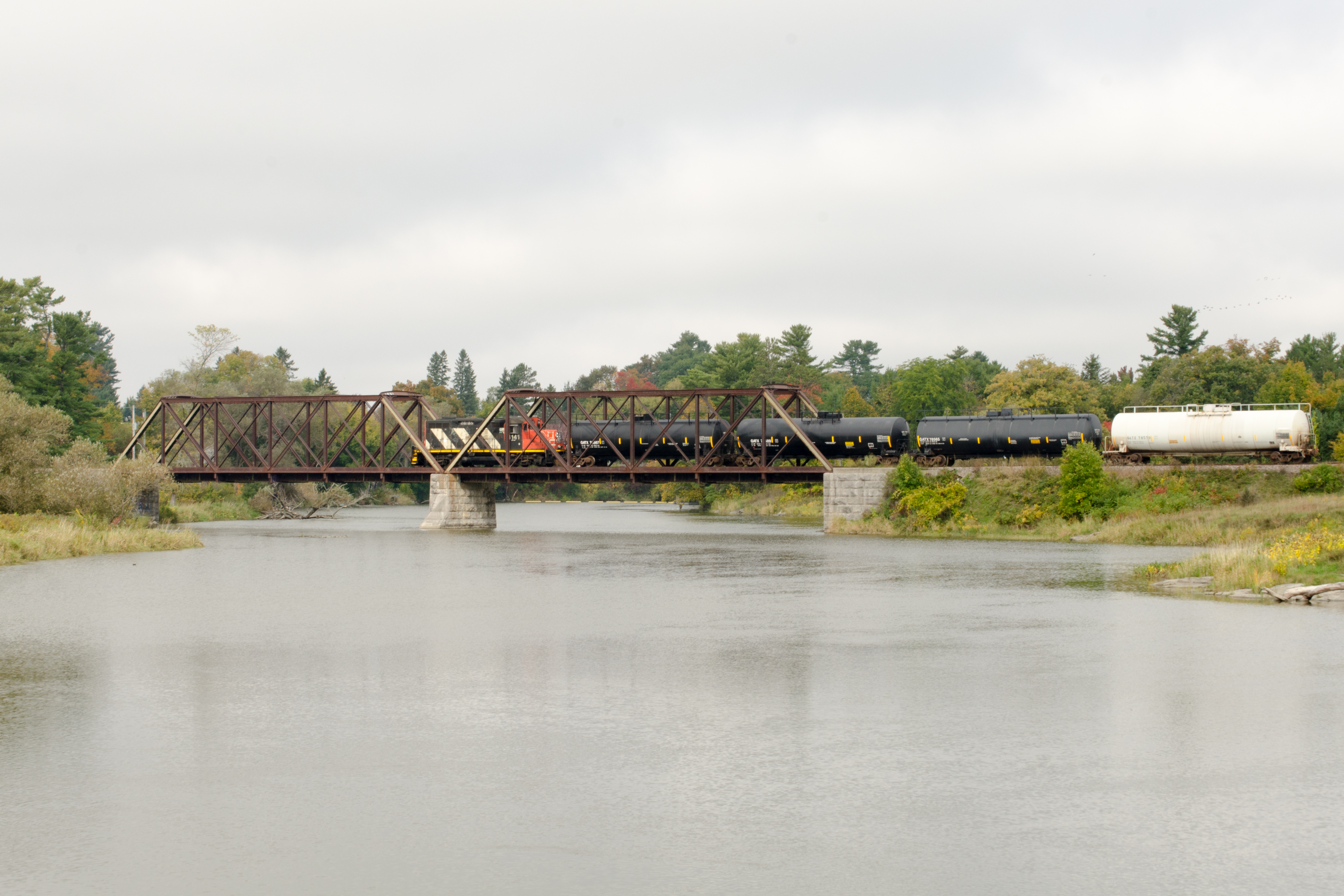
CN GATX 7565 tank car

By 2011, output from the Bakken Shale formation in North Dakota Crude was increasing faster than pipelines could be built. Oil producers and pipeline companies turned to railroads for transportation solutions. Bakken oil competes with WCS for access to transportation by pipeline and by rail. By the end of 2010, Bakken oil production rates had reached 458,000 barrels (72,800 m^{3}) per day, thereby outstripping the pipeline capacity to ship oil out of the Bakken. By January 2011 Bloomberg News reported that Bakken crude oil producers were using railway cars to ship oil.

In 2013, there were new rail shipments of WCS. Since 2012, the amount of crude oil transported by rail in Canada had quadrupled and by 2014 it was expected to continue to surge.

By January 2014 there was a proliferation of trains and pipelines carrying WCS along with an increased demand on the part of U.S. refineries. By early 2014 there were approximately 150,000 bpd of heavy oil being transported by rail.

The price of WCS rose in August 2014 as anticipated expansions in crude-by-rail capacity at Hardisty increased when USDG Gibson Energy's Hardisty Terminal, the new state-of-the-art crude-by-rail origination terminal and loading facility with pipeline connectivity, became operational in June 2014 with a capacity to load up to two 120-rail car unit trains per day (120,000 of heavy crude bbd).

Before the 2019 provincial election, the previous NDP government, had approved a plan that would cost $3.7 billion over a three-year period to transport up to 120,000 barrels per day out of Alberta by leasing 4,400 rail cars. While the NDP government said the leased cars "would generate $5.9 billion in increased royalties, taxes and commercial revenues", the UCP government under Premier Jason Kenney, who won the 2019 election, disagreed. The UCP's October 2019 budget included a $1.5 billion incentive to cancel the NDP crude-by-rail program. The government said that this would "mitigate further losses by $300 million." They entered into negotiations to privatize the crude-by-rail agreements.

After months of discussions, Premier Kenney's UCP government announced in late October 2019, that petroleum producers could increase their "oil output levels above current provincial quotas", if they incrementally increased the amount of oil they ship by rail.

=== Waterborne ===
On September 21, 2014, Suncor Energy loaded its first tanker of heavy crude, about 700,000 barrels of WCS, onto the tanker Minerva Gloria at the port of Sorel near Montreal, Quebec. Minerva Gloria is an Aframax Crude Oil double hulled tanker with a deadweight tonnage (DWT) of 115,873 tons. Her destination was Sarroch, on the Italian island of Sardinia. Minerva Gloria measures 248.96 metres (816.8 ft) × 43.84 metres (143.8 ft).

"A second tanker, the Stealth Skyros, is scheduled to load WCS crude from Montreal at the end of next week for delivery to the U.S. Gulf Coast, a person with knowledge of booking said today. That shipment will be the first waterborne delivery to the Gulf from eastern Canada for the oil, which is typically carried by pipeline."

— Tobben and Murtaugh 2014

The 116,000-dwt Stealth Skyros measures 250 metres (820 ft) × 44 metres (144 ft). From October 2013 to October 2014 Koch held a one-year charter on Stealth Skyros which was fixed for 12 months at $19,500 per day.

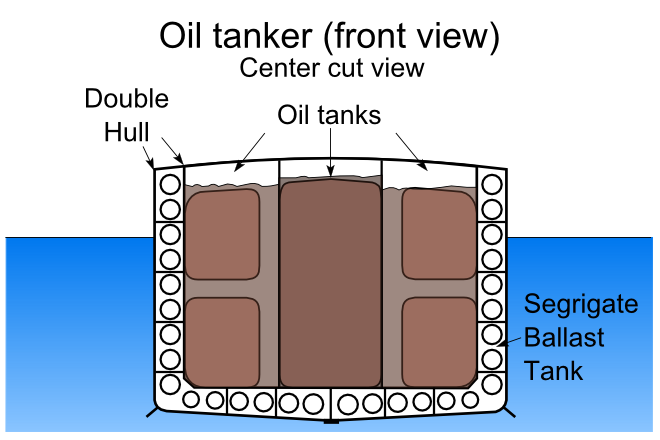
Oil tanker, double hull

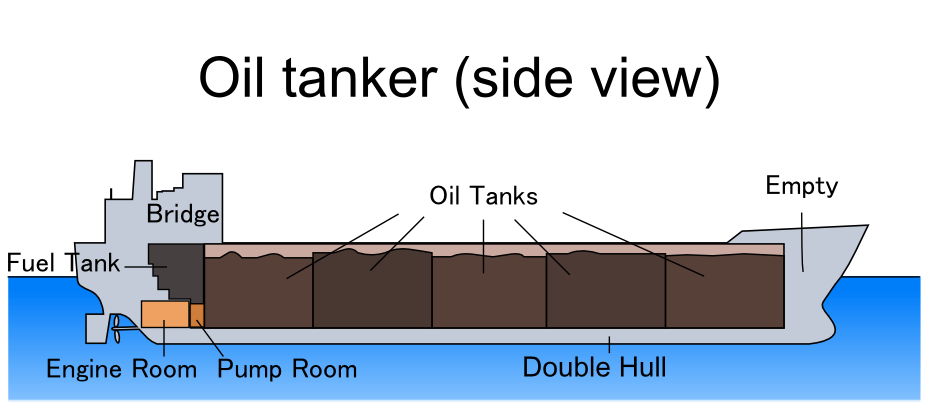
Oil tanker side view

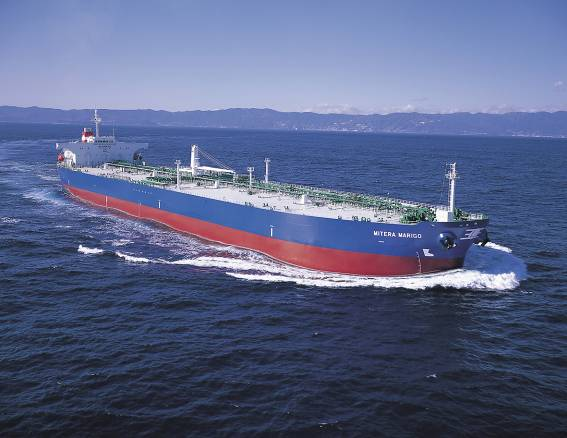
An Aframax double-hulled crude oil tanker similar to the Minerva Gloria

==== Repsol and WCS ====
The Spanish oil company Repsol obtained the license from the U.S. Department of Commerce to export 600,000 barrels of WCS from the United States. The WCS was shipped via Freeport, Texas, in the Gulf Coast (USGC) to the port of Bilbao on the Suezmax oil tanker, Aleksey Kosygin. It is considered to be "the first re-export of Canadian crude from the USGC to a non-US port" as the "US government tightly controls any crude exports, including of non-US grades." The Brussels-based European Union's European Environment Agency (EEA) monitored the trade. WCS, with its API of 20.6 and sulphur content of 3.37%, has been controversial.

In December 2014, Repsol agreed to buy Talisman Energy (TLM.TO), Canada's fifth-largest independent oil producer, for US$8.3 billion which is estimated to be at about 50 percent of Talisman's value in June 2014. By December 2014, the price of WCS had dropped to US$40.38 from $79.56 in April 2014. The global demand for oil decreased, production increased and the price of oil plunged starting in June and continuing to drop through December.

== Other oil sands crude oil products ==
Grade	Product name	API gravity	Sulphur content (as % of mass)	Operating company	Upgrader	Location of field	Port of sale
Conventional: Light Sweet	Edmonton Par Crude; Mixed Sweet Blend (MSW)	39.4°	0.42%				
Dilbit	Access Western Blend (AWB) dilbit	21.7°	3.94%	Devon Energy, Canada, MEG Energy Corp.	Edmonton	Canada	
Dilsynbit	Albian Heavy Synthetic (AHS)	19.6°	2.10%	Athabasca Oil Sands Project (AOSP) Shell Canada Energy, Chevron Canada, Marathon Oil Canada	Scotford Upgrader	Canada	
	Bow River (BR)	24.7°	2.10%			Canada	
	Canadian Par	40°				Canada	
Dilbit	Cold Lake Crude (CL)	20.8°	3.80%	Imperial Oil Resources, Cenovus Energy, Canadian Natural Resources and Shell Energy			
	Heavy Hardisty	22°				Canada	
	Lloyd Blend	22°				Canada	
	Premium Albian	35.5°	0.04%			Canada	
	Syncrude Sweet Blend	30.5-33.6°	0.07-0.13%			Canada	
	Synthetic Sweet Blend (SYN)	33.1°	0.16%	Suncor, Syncrude		Canada	
Unconventional:Dilbit	Western Canadian Select	20.3°	3.43%			Canada	Hardisty

== Derivatives markets ==
Most Western Canadian Select (WCS) is piped to Illinois for refinement and then to Cushing, Oklahoma, for sale. WCS' futures contracts are available on the Chicago Mercantile Exchange (CME)while bilateral over-the-counter WCS swaps can be cleared on Chicago Mercantile Exchange (CME)'s ClearPort or by NGX.

== Refineries ==
WCS is transported from Alberta to refineries with capacity to process heavy oil from the oil sands. The Petroleum Administration for Defense Districts (Padd II), in the US Midwest, have experience running the WCS blend. Most of WCS goes to refineries in the Midwestern United States where refineries "are configured to process a large percentage of heavy, high-sulphur crude and to produce large quantities of transportation fuels, and low amounts of heavy fuel oil". While the US refiners "invested in more complex refinery configurations with higher processing capability" that use "cheaper feedstocks" like WCS and Maya, Canada did not. While Canadian refining capacity has increased through scale and efficiency, there are only 19 refineries in Canada compared to 148 in the United States.

WCS crude oil with its "very low API (American Petroleum Institute) gravity and high sulfur content and levels of residual metals" requires specialized refining that few Canadian refineries have. It can only be processed in refiners modified with new metallurgy capable of running high-acid (TAN) crudes.

"The transportation costs associated with moving crude oil from the oil fields in Western Canada to the consuming regions in the east and the greater choice of crude qualities make it more economic for some refineries to use imported crude oil. Therefore, Canada’s oil economy is now a dual market. Refineries in Western Canada run domestically produced crude oil, refineries in Quebec and the eastern provinces run primarily imported crude oil, while refineries in Ontario run a mix of both imported and domestically produced crude oil. In more recent years, eastern refineries have begun running Canadian crude from east coast offshore production."

US refineries import large quantities of crude oil from Canada, Mexico, Colombia and Venezuela, and they began in the 1990s to build coker and sulphur capacity enhancements to accommodate the growth of these medium and heavy sour crude oils while meeting environmental requirements and consumer demand for transportation fuels. "While US refineries have made significant investments in complex refining hardware, which supports processing heavier, sourer crude into gasoline and distillates, similar investment outside the US has been pursued less aggressively. Medium and heavy crude oil make up 50% of US crude oil inputs and the US continues to expand its capacity to process heavy crude.

Large integrated oil companies that produce WCS in Canada have also started to invest in upgrading refineries in order to process WCS.

=== BP Whiting, Indiana refinery ===
The BP Plc refinery in Whiting, Indiana, is the sixth-largest refinery in the US with a capacity of 413,500 b/d. In 2012 BP began investing in a multi-billion modernization project at the Whiting refinery in order to distill WCS. This $4 billion refit was completed in 2014 and was one of the factors contributing to the increase in price of WCS. The centerpiece of the upgrade was Pipestill 12, the refinery's largest crude distillation unit, which came online in July 2013. Distillation units provide feedstock for all the other units of the refinery by distilling the crude as it enters the refinery. The Whiting refinery is situated close to the border between Indiana and Illinois. It is the major buyer of WCS and WTI from Cushing, Oklahoma, the delivery point of the US benchmark oil contract.

On August 8, 2015, there was a malfunction of piping inside Pipestill 12 causing heavy damage and the unit was offline until August 25. This was one of the major factors contributing to the drop in the price of oil with WCS at its lowest price in nine years.

=== Toledo refinery, Ohio ===
The Toledo refinery in northwestern Ohio, in which BP has invested around $500 million on improvements since 2010, is a joint venture with Husky Energy, which operates the refinery, and processes approximately 160,000 barrels of crude oil per day. Since the early 2000s, the company has been focusing its refining business on processing crude from oil sands and shales.

=== Sarnia-Lambton $10-billion oil sands bitumen upgrading project ===
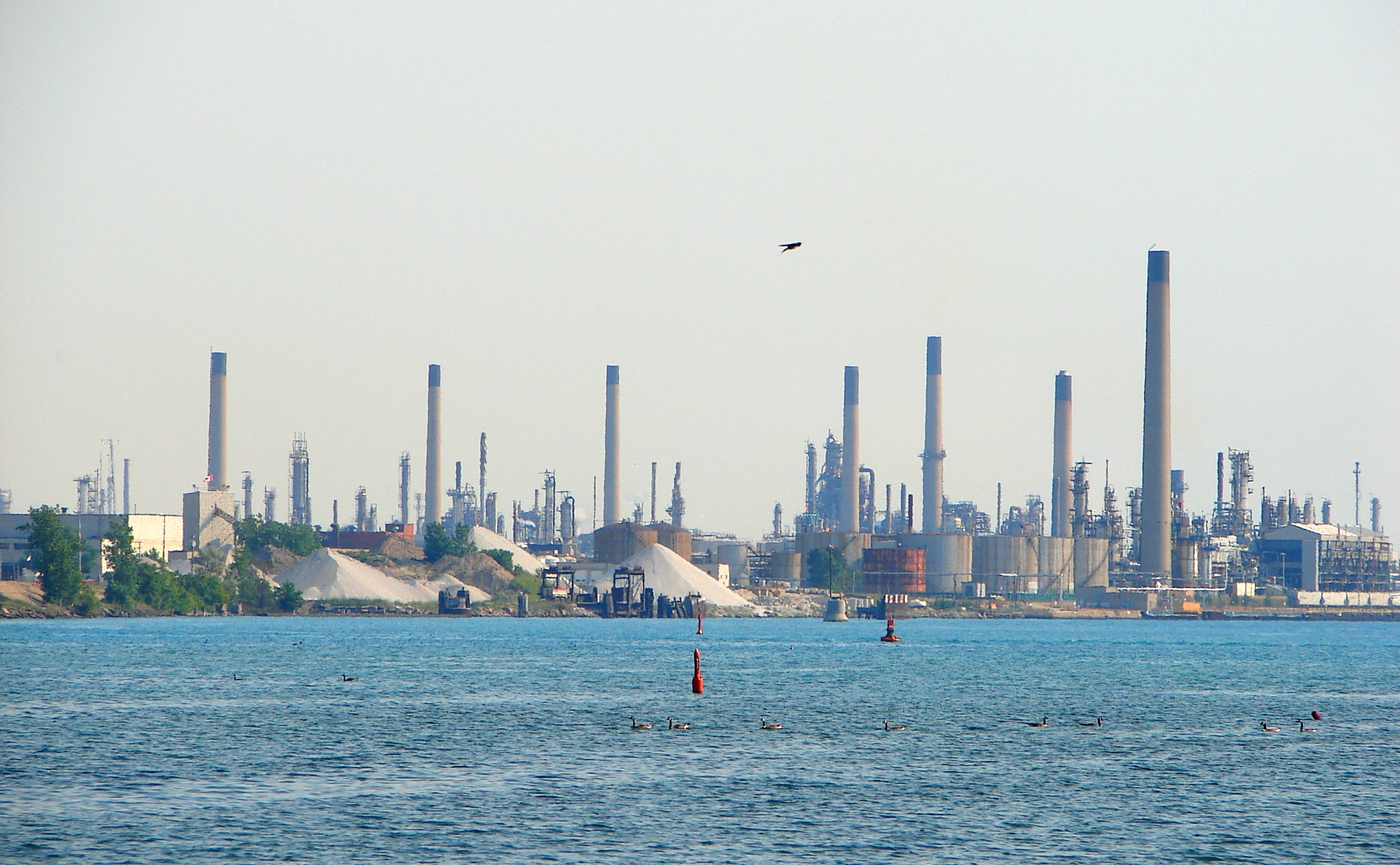
Imperial Oil, Sarnia refinery

Since September 2013 WCS has been processed at Imperial Oil's Sarnia, Ontario, refinery and ExxonMobil Corporation's (XOM) has 238,000 barrels (37,800 m^{3}) Joliet plant, Illinois and Baton Rouge, Louisiana.

By April 2013, Imperial Oil's 121,000 barrels (19,200 m^{3}) Sarnia, Ontario refinery was the only plugged-in coking facility in eastern Canada that could process raw bitumen.

In July 2014 the Canadian Academy of Engineering identified the Sarnia-Lambton $10-billion oil sands bitumen upgrading project to produce refinery ready crudes, as a high priority national scale project.

=== Co-op Refinery Complex ===
Lloydminster heavy oil, a component in the Western Canadian Select (WCS) heavy oil blend, is processed at the Co-op Refinery Complex heavy oil upgrader which had a fire in the coker of the heavy oil upgrader section of the plant, on February 11, 2013. It was the third major incident in 16 months, at the Regina plant. The price of Western Canadian Select weakened against U.S. benchmark West Texas Intermediate (WTI) oil.

=== Pine Bend Refinery ===
The Pine Bend Refinery, the largest oil refinery in Minnesota, located in the Twin Cities receives 80% of its incoming heavy crude from the Athabasca oil sands. The crude oil is piped from the northwest to the facility through the Lakehead and Minnesota pipelines which are also owned by Koch Industries. Most petroleum enters and exits the plant through a Koch-owned, 537-mile pipeline system that stretches across Minnesota and Wisconsin. The U.S. Energy Information Agency (EIA) ranked it at 14th in the country as of 2013 by production. By 2013 its nameplate capacity increased to 330,000 barrels (52,000 m^{3}) per day.

=== Repsol ===
Repsol responded to the enforcement in January 2009 of the European Union's reduced sulphur content in automotive petrol and diesel from 50 to 10 parts per million, with heavy investment in upgrading their refineries. They were upgrading three of their five refineries in Spain (Cartagena, A Coruña, Bilbao, Puertollano and Tarragona) with cokers that have the capacity to refine Western Canadian Select heavy oil. Many other European refineries closed as margins decreased. Repsol tested the first batches of WCS at its Spanish refineries in May 2014.

==== Cartagena refinery ====
In 2012 Repsol completed its €3.15-billion upgrade and expansion of its Cartagena refinery in Murcia, Spain, which included a new coking unit capable of refining heavy crude like WCS.

=== Blenders: ANS, WCS, Bakken Oil ===
In their 2013 article published in Oil & Gas Journal, John Auers and John Mayes suggest that the "recent pricing disconnects have created opportunities for astute crude oil blenders and refiners to create their own substitutes for waterborne grades (like Alaska North Slope (ANS)) at highly discounted prices. A "pseudo" Alaskan North Slope substitute, for example, could be created with a blend of 55% Bakken and 45% Western Canadian Select at a cost potentially far less than the ANS market price." They argue that there are financial opportunities for refineries capable of blending, delivering, and refining "stranded" cheaper crude blends, like Western Canadian Select(WCS). In contrast to the light, sweet oil produced "from emerging shale plays in North Dakota (Bakken) and Texas (Eagle Ford) as well as a resurgence of drilling in older, existing fields, such as the Permian basin", the oil sands of Alberta is "overwhelmingly heavy".

=== Impact of Bakken tight oil on WCS ===
The CIBC reported that the oil industry continued to produce massive amounts of oil in spite of a stagnant crude oil market. Oil production from the Bakken formation alone was forecast in 2012 to grow by 600,000 barrels every year through 2016. By 2012, Canadian tight oil and oil sands production was also surging.

By the end of 2014, as the demand for global oil consumption continued to decline, the remarkably rapid oil output growth in ‘light, tight’ oil production in the North Dakota Bakken, the Permian and Eagle Ford Basins in Texas, while rejuvenating economic growth in "U.S. refining, petrochemical and associated transportation industries, rail & pipelines", [it also] "destabilized international oil markets".

Since 2000, the wider use of oil extraction technologies such as hydraulic fracturing and horizontal drilling, have caused a production boom in the Bakken formation which lies beneath the northwestern part of North Dakota. WCS and Bakken compete for pipelines and railway space. By the end of 2010, oil production rates had reached 458,000 barrels (72,800 m^{3}) per day, thereby outstripping the pipeline capacity to ship oil out of the Bakken. This oil competes with WCS for access to transportation by pipeline and rail. Bakken production has also increased in Canada, although to a lesser degree than in the US, since the 2004 discovery of the Viewfield Oil Field in Saskatchewan.

== Royalties ==
Royalty rates in Alberta are based on the price of WTI. That royalty rate is applied to a project's net revenue if the project has reached payout or gross revenue if the project has not yet reached payout. A project's revenue is a direct function of the price it is able to sell its crude for. Since WCS is a benchmark for oil sands crudes, revenues in the oil sands are discounted when the price of WCS is discounted. Those price discounts flow through to the royalty payments.

The Province of Alberta receives a portion of benefits from the development of energy resources in the form of royalties that fund in part programs like health, education and infrastructure.

In 2006–07, the oil sands royalty revenue was $2.411 billion. In 2007–08, it rose to $2.913 billion and it continued to rise in 2008–09 to $2.973 billion. Following the revised Alberta Royalty Regime, it fell in 2009–10 to $1.008 billion. In that year, Alberta's total resource revenue "fell below $7 billion...when the world economy was in the grip of recession".

In February 2012, the Province of Alberta "expected $13.4 billion in revenue from non-renewable resources in 2013-14". By January 2013, the province was anticipating only $7.4 billion. "30 percent of Alberta’s approximately $40-billion budget is funded through oil and gas revenues. Bitumen royalties represent about half of that total." In 2009–10, royalties from the oil sands amounted to $1.008 billion (Budget 2009 cited in Energy Alberta 2009).

In order to accelerate the development of the oil sands, the federal and provincial governments more closely aligned taxation of the oil sands with other surface mining resulting in "charging one percent of a project’s gross revenues until the project’s investment costs are paid in full at which point rates increased to 25 percent of net revenue. These policy changes and higher oil prices after 2003 had the desired effect of accelerating the development of the oil sands industry." A revised Alberta Royalty Regime was implemented on January 1, 2009. through which each oil sands project pays a gross revenue royalty rate of 1% (Oil and Gas Fiscal Regimes 2011:30). Oil and Gas Fiscal Regimes 2011 summarizes the petroleum fiscal regimes for the western provinces and territories. The Oil and Gas Fiscal Regimes described how royalty payments were calculated:

"After an oil sands royalty project reaches payout, the royalty payable to the Crown is equal to the greater of: (a) the gross revenue royalty (1% - 9%) for the period, and (b) the royalty percentage (25% - 40%) of net revenue for the period. Effective January 1, 2009 the royalty percentage of net revenue is also indexed to the Canadian dollar price of WTI. It is 25% when the WTI price is less than or equal to $55/bbl, rising linearly to a maximum of 40% when the price reaches $120/bbl. For royalty purposes, net revenue equals project revenue less allowed costs."

— Oil and Gas Fiscal Regimes

When the price of oil per barrel is less than or equal to $55/bbl indexed against West Texas Intermediate (WTI) (Oil and Gas Fiscal Regimes 2011:30)(Indexed to the Canadian dollar price of West Texas Intermediate (WTI) (Oil and Gas Fiscal Regimes 2011:30) to a maximum of 9%). When the price of oil per barrel is less than or equal to $120/ bbl indexed against West Texas Intermediate (WTI) "payout".

Payout refers "the first time when the developer has recovered all the allowed costs of the project, including a return allowance on those costs equal to the Government of Canada long-term bond rate ["LTBR"].

In order to encourage growth and prosperity and due to the extremely high cost of exploration, research and development, oil sands and mining operations pay no corporate, federal, provincial taxes or government royalties other than personal income taxes as companies often remain in a loss position for tax and royalty purposes for many years. Defining a loss position becomes increasingly complex when vertically integrated multinational energy companies are involved. Suncor claims their realized losses were legitimate and that Canada Revenue Agency (CRA) is unfairly claiming "$1.2-billion" in taxes which is jeopardizing their operations.

From 2009 to 2015, oil sands royalties represented the largest contributor to the province's royalty revenues and contributed about 10% of all of Alberta revenues. In 2014-2015 oil sands revenue was over $5 billion and represented over 10% of Alberta's $48.5 operational expenses. As of December 2015, the only sources of revenue that contributed more were personal income tax provides at 23%, federal transfers at 13%, and corporate income tax at 11%.

In 2023, 1.8 billion barrels of oil were extracted from the Alberta oil sands.

=== Oil Sands Royalty Rates ===
"Bitumen Valuation Methodology (BVM) is a method to determine for royalty purposes a value for bitumen produced in oil sands projects and either upgraded on-site or sold or transferred to affiliates. The BVM ensures that Alberta receives market value for its bitumen production, taken in cash or bitumen royalty-in-kind, through the royalty formula. Western Canadian Select (WCS), a grade or blend of Alberta bitumens, diluents (a product such as naphtha or condensate which is added to increase the ability of the oil to flow through a pipeline) and conventional heavy oils, developed by Alberta producers and stored and valued at Hardisty, AB was determined to be the best reference crude price in the development of a BVM."

Price WTI C $/bbl	Pre-Payout Royalty Rate on Gross Revenue	Post Payout Royalty Rate on Net Revenue
Below C$55	1.00%	25.00%
C$60	1.62%	26.15%
C$75	3.46%	29.62%
C$100	6.54%	35.38%
Above C$120	9.00%	40.00%

=== Bitumen Bubble ===
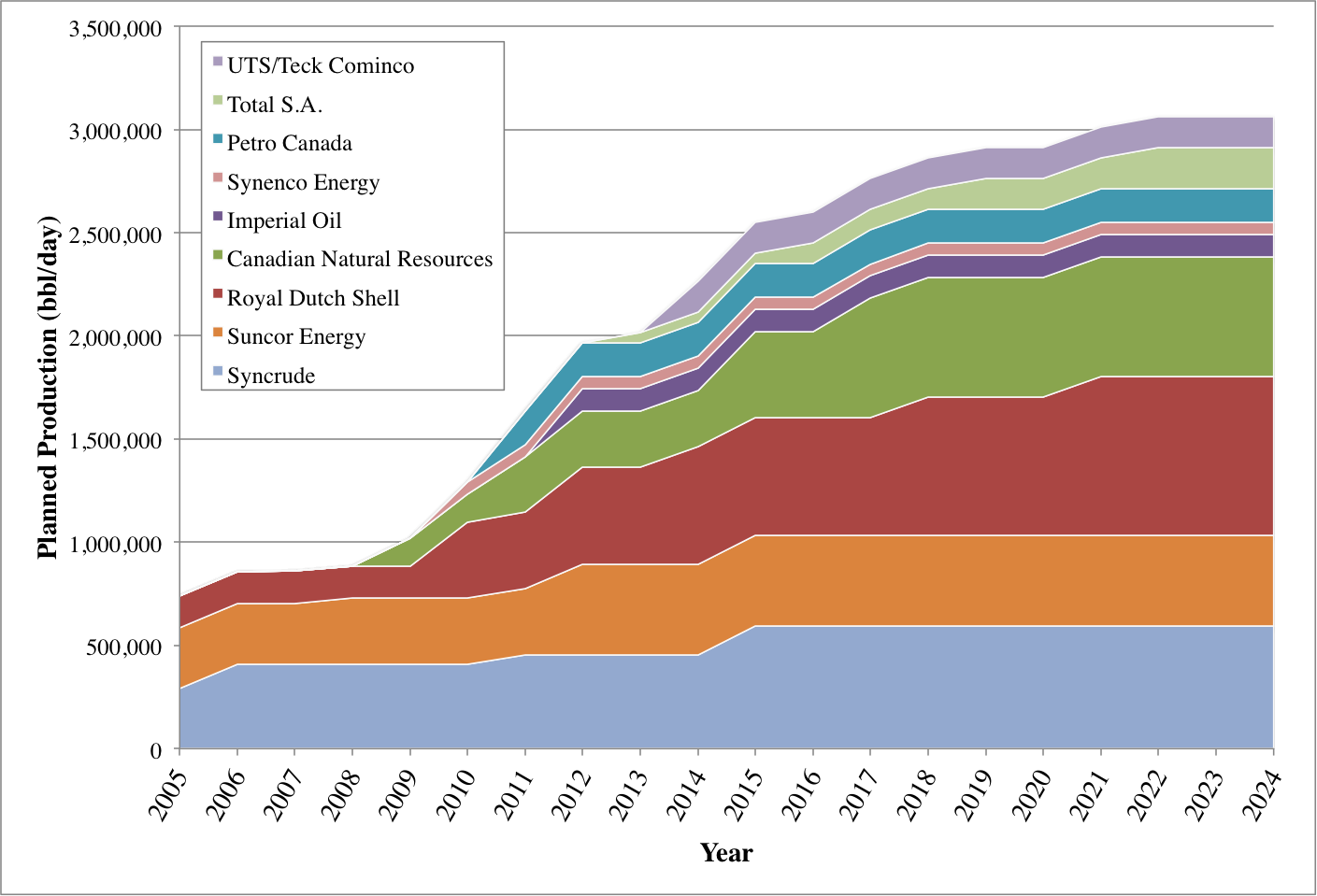
Athabasca Oil Sands Planned Production 2012

In January 2013, the then-Premier of Alberta, Alison Redford, used the term "bitumen bubble" to explain the impact of a dramatic and unanticipated drop in the amount of taxes and revenue from the oil sands linked to the deep discount price of Western Canadian Select against WTI and Maya crude oil, would result in deep cuts in the 2013 provincial budget. In 2012 oil prices rose and fell all year. Premier Redford described the "bitumen bubble" as the differential or "spread between the different prices and the lower price for Alberta's Western Canadian Select (WCS)". In 2013 alone, the "bitumen bubble" effect resulted in a loss of about six billion dollars in provincial revenue.

== See also ==
- Petroleum classification
- List of crude oil products
- Canadian Centre for Energy Information
- History of the petroleum industry in Canada (oil sands and heavy oil)
- Syncrude
- Suncor
- CNRL
