= TitanFile =

- Developer: TitanFile Inc.
- Release: March 16, 2011; 15 years ago
- Available in: English, French
- Type: File sharing
- Website: www.titanfile.com

TitanFile Inc.
- Type: Privately held company
- Industry: File sharing
- Founded: June 2007; 19 years ago in Halifax, Canada
- Founder: Tony Abou-Assaleh; Milan Vrekic
- Headquarters: Toronto, Canada
- Area served: Worldwide
- Website: www.titanfile.com

TitanFile Inc. is a Canadian cloud computing company headquartered in Toronto, Ontario. TitanFile provides a secure way for professionals to communicate and share files with their clients.

== History ==
In 2010, the company won the Nova Scotia Co-operative's Best Big Idea 2010 competition and Dyn and CloudCamp's Cloudy Awards 2011. In March 2011, co-founders Milan Vrekic and Tony Abou-Assaleh launched TitanFile publicly. That same month, The Chronicle Herald mentioned TitanFile's support for organizations and individuals to securely share documents.

In August 2011, TitanFile secured a $250,000 CAD seed financing round from Innovacorp, and in December 2011, TitanFile announced their first expansion plans into Kitchener, Ontario. The company was recognized in Canada's Top 25 ICT Up & Coming List by Branham300 and was awarded runner-up in Backbone magazine's Alpha Exchange Innovation Campaign Pitch-Off in Toronto.

On October 11, 2012, the company revealed that it was relaunching the original TitanFile design to accommodate a more collaborative environment for their users. That same day it announced a $1.1 million financing round from investors at Innovacorp, First Angel Network (FAN), and a handful of private investors.

On October 13, 2013, TitanFile released a suite of enterprise features to cater to the needs of modern professional teams. In December 2013, the company was part of the "48 Hours in the Valley" program held in San Francisco. The company finished the year by partnering with Hitachi Solutions America to create a more secure system with enhanced user controls and mobile capabilities.

== Product ==
TitanFile was originally designed to be a robust and reliable one-way file transfer solution for users wishing to send and receive electronic documents that were too big or too confidential for email. The company changed its focus to accommodate secure client correspondence in 2012. Today, TitanFile is a web and mobile application that combines file management and sharing, instant messaging, and security.
