= Timeline of the 2025–2026 United States trade war with Canada =

On February 1, 2025, United States president Donald Trump announced sweeping tariffs on Canadian goods, including a 25% tariff on most imports and a 10% tariff on Canadian energy products. Canada responded with its own retaliatory tariffs on $30 billion worth of U.S. goods, escalating to $155 billion after three weeks. These measures marked a significant escalation in trade tensions, disrupting longstanding cross-border economic cooperation and prompting both countries to implement additional countermeasures and support programs for affected industries.

The conflict quickly expanded to include tariffs on steel, aluminum, automobiles, and a range of consumer goods, with both federal and provincial governments in Canada taking steps to mitigate the impact on businesses and workers. The trade war has led to market volatility, strained diplomatic relations, and forced companies on both sides of the border to adapt to new supply chain realities, while ongoing negotiations and temporary exemptions have provided only limited relief amid continued uncertainty.

In early 2026, the Supreme Court of the United States struck down several of Trump's sweeping emergency tariffs imposed under the International Emergency Economic Powers Act, in Learning Resources, Inc. v. Trump prompting Trump to announce a new temporary 10% global tariff that largely exempts CUSMA-compliant Canadian and Mexican goods but leaves sector-specific and other trade measures in place.

== 2024 ==
- February 21, 2024 The bilateral trade relationship between the United States and Canada is one of the world's largest—Canada buys "more from American businesses than the UK, France, China and Japan combined". In 2023, a total of US$923 billion goods and services was traded. Both the energy and automotive markets are highly integrated. According to a CRS report based on U.S. Bureau of Economic Analysis data, taking into consideration both goods and services, in 2023, Canada was the United States' largest trading partner with U.S. imports from Canada valued at US$482 billion and U.S. exports to Canada valued at US$441 billion resulting a US$41 billion shortfall with Canada. The 2024 US$45 billion trade deficit with Canada in 2024 is the second smallest of all American trade deficits, representing 4% of the overall U.S. trade deficit. Reduction of Canadian imports "would barely move the needle", according to Toronto Dominion Bank (TD) economists. (Note: China's trade deficit with the U.S. is eight times higher, and with Mexico, five times higher than the deficit with Canada.) (Note: Ninety percent of Canada's oil is sold to the United States which represents about US$4 million barrels per day. With such a highly integrated energy system between the two countries, "there is no easy way" for the U.S. to replace Canadian oil. Any significant decline in the amount of oil sent to the United States would take years of tariffs according to Enbridge CEO. A CRS report "U.S.-Canada Trade Relations" said that the Russian invasion of Ukraine in February 2022 caused an increase in global market instability and the rising price of energy, which increased the value of imported Canadian oil. Toronto Dominion Bank (TD) economists said that many U.S. refineries have specific capacities to process only sour, heavy crude, such as—Western Canada Select. Other options for obtaining this feedstock are Mexico and Venezuela—the former have a large trade surplus with the U.S., and Venezuela is under U.S. sanctions.)
- October 15, 2024 In an interview with Bloomberg News editor John Micklethwait at the Economic Club of Chicago on October 15, 2024, then-presidential candidate Donald Trump outlined his economic strategy, emphasizing the use of "draconian" tariffs as a key component to fund his proposed tax cuts, which would incentivize companies to invest in manufacturing within the United States.
- November 25 In a post on Truth Social, Trump announced that one of his first Executive Orders would impose and maintain a 25% tariff on Canada and Mexico citing their alleged inadequate efforts to control their borders.

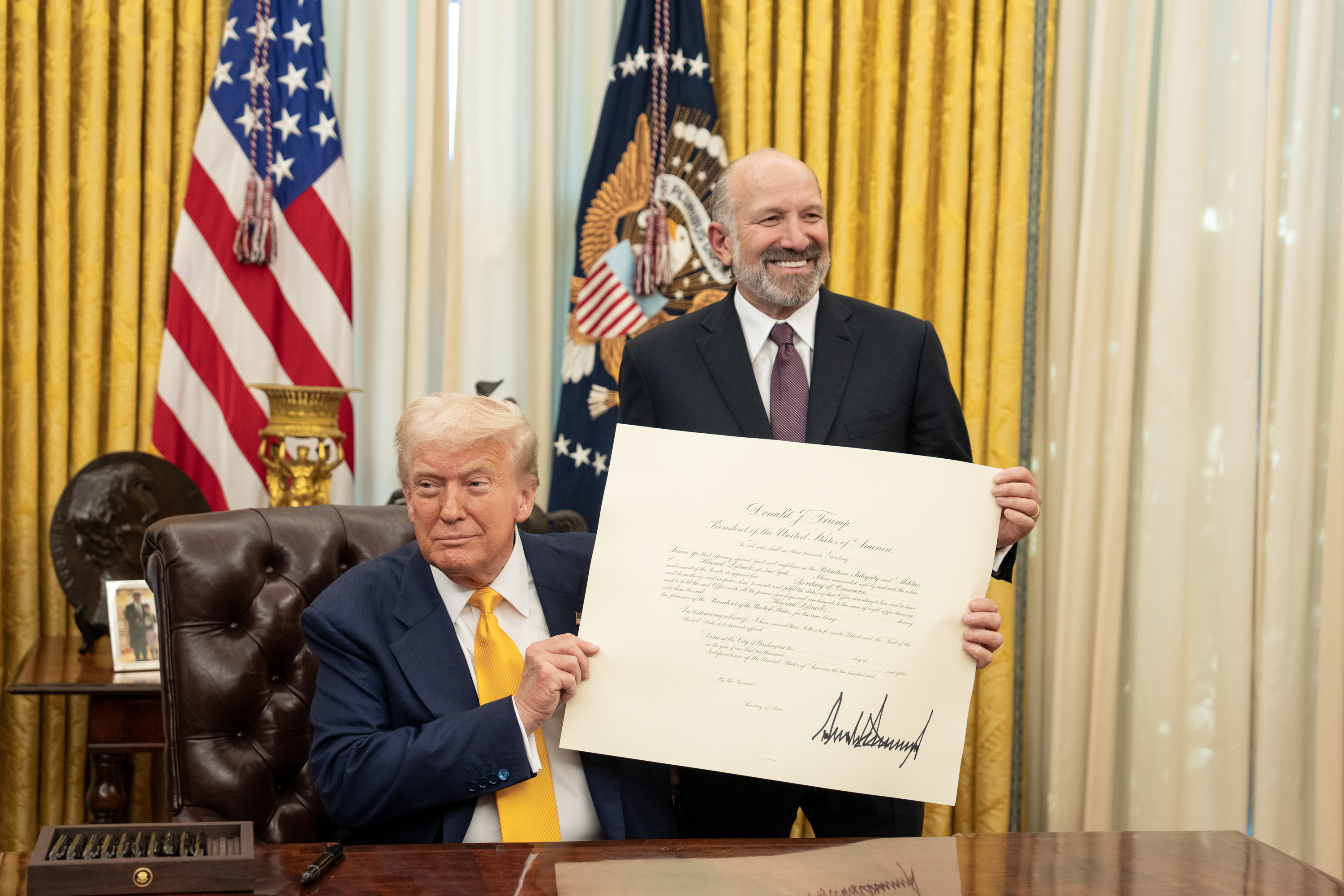
President Trump with Howard Lutnick being sworn in as Commerce Secretary (February 21, 2025)

- November 29 Days after Trump's Truth Social post threatened 25% tariffs on Canadian imports, Canadian Prime Minister Justin Trudeau, Dominic LeBlanc, Canada's Finance Minister, US Commerce Secretary Howard Lutnick and others dined at Trump's Florida estate, Mar-a-Lago to discuss trade and tariffs.
- December 5 The chief economist of the largest farm group in the United States—the American Farm Bureau Federation cautioned that it was important that the United States' administration "talk first" with "friends like Mexico and Canada" before "shooting". Export sales of agricultural products represent approximately 20% of the U.S. agricultural sector sales—Canada and Mexico are American farmers' largest export customers and import suppliers.
- December 9 Then-President-elect Donald Trump referred to Trudeau as Governor of the Great State of Canada.
- December 16 The Canadian Department of Finance announced initiatives in response to economic uncertainties following the 2024 United States presidential election including new tariffs on Chinese products.

== 2025 ==
=== January ===
- January 6 In a Truth Social post, Trump made the false claim that "Many people in Canada LOVE being the 51st State." A CNN article fact-checking Trump's claims about Canada, said that the 51st idea is "massively unpopular" in Canada— 85% are opposed and only 9% are in favor. It is one thing that politicians on left and right "vehemently" reject. In the same post, Trump said without evidence that by joining the U.S. as a state, Canada "would be TOTALLY SECURE from the threat of the Russian and Chinese Ships that are constantly surrounding them." Canada has never been surrounded as described. While there have been sporadic sightings of Russian and Chinese military ships and aircraft, as well as Chinese research vessels viewed with suspicion, in the vicinity of Alaska in recent years, these occurrences have been limited and monitored by Canadian and U.S. military forces.
- January 7 During a press conference at Mar-a-Lago, in response to a question by NBC correspondent Vaughn Hillyard, then President-elect Trump said he would not use "military force to annex and acquire" Canada but he would use "economic force". He said that getting "rid of that artificially drawn line"—the Canada–United States border— would improve national security. Trump said that the United States was subsidizing Canada by over US$200 billion annually through the U.S. trade deficit with Canada. (Note: According to the Congressional Research Service there was a United States US$41 billion trade deficit with Canada in 2023 with a total trade between the two countries of US$923 billion—with Canada importing US$482 billion of goods and services and the U.S. exporting US$441 billion to Canada.) Trump conflates the trade deficit with a subsidy. In 2024 the U.S. trade deficit with Canada in goods and services was US$35.7 billion—excluding services, it was US$70.6 billion according to official US statistics.
- January 15 A meeting convened by Prime Minister Trudeau with First Ministers—premiers of Canadian provinces—was held to discuss the threat of tariffs by the United States, including revisiting the Canadian Free Trade Agreement (CFTA) that regulates interprovincial trade.
- January 20 In a memo President Donald Trump told officials to "assess the unlawful migration and fentanyl flows" from Canada, Mexico and China" and then "recommend appropriate trade and national security measures to resolve that emergency."
- January 22 A second meeting of First Ministers was held to prepare for a trade war and to discuss the removal of the 2017 detailed list of approximately 245 exemptions to the CFTA so Canadian consumers could trade goods and move workers between provinces.
- January 29 Canadian Foreign Minister Mélanie Joly met with United States Secretary of State Marco Rubio in Washington, D.C. in response to the threat of steep United States tariffs that could result in a trade war between the two countries. Joly expressed cautious optimism about a diplomatic solution to trade relations. Along with presenting details of Canada's initiatives in working with the United States to tackle illegal immigration and fentanyl at the border, she clarified that less than 1% of the fentanyl and less than 1% of illegal immigrants enter the United States through the Canadian border.
- January 31 Columbia University's economics professor and Nobel Laureate Joseph Stiglitz said that "Virtually all economists think that the impact of the tariffs will be very bad for America and for the world...They will almost surely be inflationary...It's inconceivable that other countries won't retaliate."

=== February ===
- February 1 at the beginning of his second non-consecutive term, President Trump signed three executive orders and a Fact Sheet under the authority of the 1977 International Emergency Economic Powers Act (IEEPA) declaring a national emergency. He announced that Canada and Mexico would be sanctioned with tariffs starting on March 4, citing an "extraordinary threat posed by illegal aliens and drugs" and their "series of failures" to "address the flow of narcotics into the United States". His E.O "Imposing Duties to Address the Flow of Illicit Drugs Across Our Northern Border" and Fact Sheet said that "Canada has played a central role in these challenges, including by failing to devote sufficient attention and resources or meaningfully coordinate with United States law enforcement partners to effectively stem the tide of illicit drugs."

- – On CPAC, the Canadian parliamentary channel, Trudeau announced retaliatory 25% tariffs valuing CA$155 billion (US$107 billion) on products from the United States.

- February 2 The Royal Bank of Canada's Chief Economists said that the blanket 25% tariffs on all imports from Canada and the 10% tariff on energy products represented the country's largest trade shock in nearly 100 years" comparing it to the Smoot–Hawley Tariffs. (Note: The Economist, the Royal Bank of Canada, The Financial Post, NPR, and other news outlets also compared the blanket tariffs announced on February 1 to the Smoot–Hawley Tariffs.)

- – Media outlets examine the disconnect between the E.O. and the nature of the changing grievances and lists of things that Trump wants.

- February 3 Trump announced a 30-day pause on Canadian tariffs.

- – According to the Associated Press, in the 2024 fiscal year United States Customs agents "seized 43 lb (20 kg) of fentanyl at the Canadian border", "compared with 21,100 lb (9,600 kg) at the Mexican border," which represents less than one per cent of all fentanyl seized by US border agents imports coming into the United States and into the United States. CBC News reported that in 2024, Canadian border officials confiscated eight million grams of drugs that had been smuggled into Canada compared to five million grams entering the United States via Canada seized by the U.S. Customs and Border Protection.
- – According to a 2025 CRS backgrounder report on the International Emergency Economic Powers Act (IEEPA), since Trump is the first president to use the IEEPA to impose tariffs, open questions remain about the "scale and scope of what tariffs might be authorized under the statute."
- – A series of "high-stakes" phone calls between Trump and Trudeau and between other officials took place. Trump cited a memo which included a list of grievances with Canada that were unrelated to trade, such as renegotiating the Canada–United States border. (Note: Grievances against Canada unrelated to trade were listed in a memo that Trump referred to in the February 3 phone call with Trudeau. This included potential changes to the Canada–United States border as defined in a 1908 agreement between the United States and Great Britain. Trudeau reminded Trump that since the Constitution Act, 1982 Canada is a sovereign nation. Trump said without evidence that American banks cannot operate in Canada. According to Canadian Bankers Association as of 2025, there are 16 American banks operating in Canada.)

- February 7–8 According to a Bloomberg News/Harris poll in early February, approximately 60% of Americans believe high tariffs would cause consumer prices to rise.
- February 10 A 25% tariff on aluminum and steel is announced in an Executive Order that cited an update on a 2018 report that said that the significant increase in steel imports from Canada, Mexico and other countries to "once again threaten to impair U.S. national security." Canada is the largest supplier of steel and aluminum to the United States, representing 22% of steel imports and 47% of aluminum imports in 2022. (Note: A 2023 United States Congressional Research Service (CRS) report "Import Monitoring Systems: Steel and Aluminum", citing the United States Department of Commerce said that Canada is the largest supplier of steel and aluminum to the United States representing 22% of steel imports and 47% of aluminum imports in 2022. During Trump's first presidency, his administration's 25% tariff on Canadian steel and a 10 per cent tariff on Canadian aluminum remained in place for a year, ending in 2019. See also 2002 United States steel tariff.)

- – In response to the tariffs on steel and aluminium, Trudeau, who was in Paris at an international conference on artificial intelligence, said that the tariffs were "entirely unjustified." Canada and the European Union "vowed to retaliate firmly" according to France 24.

- February 11 Trump reinstated 25% tariff on steel imports and increased tariffs on aluminum imports to 25% on Canada and other countries.

- – Trudeau announced the appointment of Kevin Brosseau as Canada's new Fentanyl Czar to work with Americans to "disrupt and dismantle this illegal drug trade crossing our border".

- February 14 Wells Fargo and Company economists warned in their February 14 memo, that "Tariff worries are real" as retail sales slumped.
- February 20 Details of the February 3 phone calls between Trump and Trudeau emerge.
- February 26 Trump suggest that a one-month reprieve on tariffs is possible with the sanctions on Canada and Mexico to begin on April 2.
- February 27 The Peterson Institute for International Economics cautioned that the cost of the combined tariffs to the typical American family would be over $1,200 a year, according to a February 27 Bloomberg News article.

- – The Canada Border Services Agency (CBSA) announced the launch of Operation Blizzard to respond to fentanyl smuggling. Since early February, CBSA and their partners made significant seizures at the Canada–United States border, including six seizures amounting to 1.98 oz (56 g) of fentanyl brought in by two US citizens. It only takes a few grams of fentanyl to cause death.
- – A CBC News article listed the efforts Canada made in February alone. Royal Canadian Mounted Police Commissioner and CBSA president met with American officials to present "major successes" in decreasing the flow of drugs and migrants into the United States. (Note: At the northern border with the United States, there are large quantities of drugs and guns coming into Canada—52,400 kilograms (115,500 lb) of "prohibited drugs, cannabis, narcotics and chemicals" along with over "930 firearms and 17,200 prohibited weapons", in 2024 alone. In contrast less than 1% of the fentanyl enter the United States from Canada.)
- – In a reversal of his February 26 suggestions to the Cabinet to give a one-month reprieve to April 4, Trump announced that tariffs will go into effect March 4.

- February 28 In February the number of inbound trips by Canadians to the United States dropped by 20%.

=== March ===
- March 3 An amendment backtracked on the February 2 E.O. to allow some de minimis trade rule treatment.

- – Trump announced that 25% tariffs on imports from Mexico and Canada that he had threatened, then delayed from the earlier February 4 date, would enter into force on March 4. Along with the increase of tariffs on China from 10% to 20% set to take place the same day, this caused the U.S. stock market to drop considerably: the S&P 500 index fell by 1.8%, while the Nasdaq-100 index fell by 2.6%. By March 6, the S&P 500 had lost almost all of its gains since November 2024.
- – The Economist described Trump's tariffs as aggressive and erratic, and said that they would "cause lasting damage at home and abroad".
- – William Reinsch of the Center for Strategic and International Studies contrasted the current trade war with Trump's first in 2018-2019, which economist say will be much more costly.
- – According to an Associated Press article, if Trump substitutes tariff revenue for income taxes, tariffs would remain in place in spite of demands being met.
- – KPMG's chief economist Diane Swonk said Trump's "reciprocal tariffs" witrh "multiple countries at the same time" means that the "rest of the world" could retaliate.
- – Brian Bethune, an economist at Boston College said that Trump's tariffs could "push up mortgage and loan borrowing rates ... and reduce real growth."

- March 4 Department of Finance Canada published a detailed list of retaliatory tariffs.

A CBC News article said that, "The notion that the flow of illegal fentanyl across the U.S. border with Canada could somehow justify punitive tariffs on Canadian imports was always flimsy, at best."
Reporting from Brussels on March 4, a Politico article cited a European Union executive who said the tariffs put global trade at risk, harms economic partnerships, and incites "unnecessary uncertainty at a time when international cooperation is more crucial than ever." The Chair of the European Parliament international trade committee said that the tariffs were "incomprehensible", "illegal and completely unjustified". He said that there are only losers, no winners in a trade war and that "American companies, workers and consumers will suffer too."
- – Leading American automobile industry lobbiest told Trump that 25% tariffs announced on March 2, would give the foreign automobile industry an advantage over American carmakers. They told Trump that the price of vehicles could rise as much as 25% and that this could take place "almost immediately".

- March 5 Canada requests a World Trade Organization (WTO) dispute consultation with the U.S. regarding their "unjustified tariffs". Consultations are the first stage of formal dispute settlement; if no solution is reached within 60 days, Canada can request adjudication by the WTO's dispute settlement body.
  - In a phone call Ford Motors' CEO Jim Farley and Executive Chairman Bill Ford, General Motors' CEO Mary Barra, and Stellantis' Chairman John Elkann asked Trump to give a reprieve on the 25% tariffs on imports related to the automobile industry that are in compliance with the rules under the U.S.-Mexico-Canada Agreement signed by Trump in 2020. Increased prices caused by tariffs because of the interconnected automobile industry's supply chain, could also lead to higher automobile insurance.

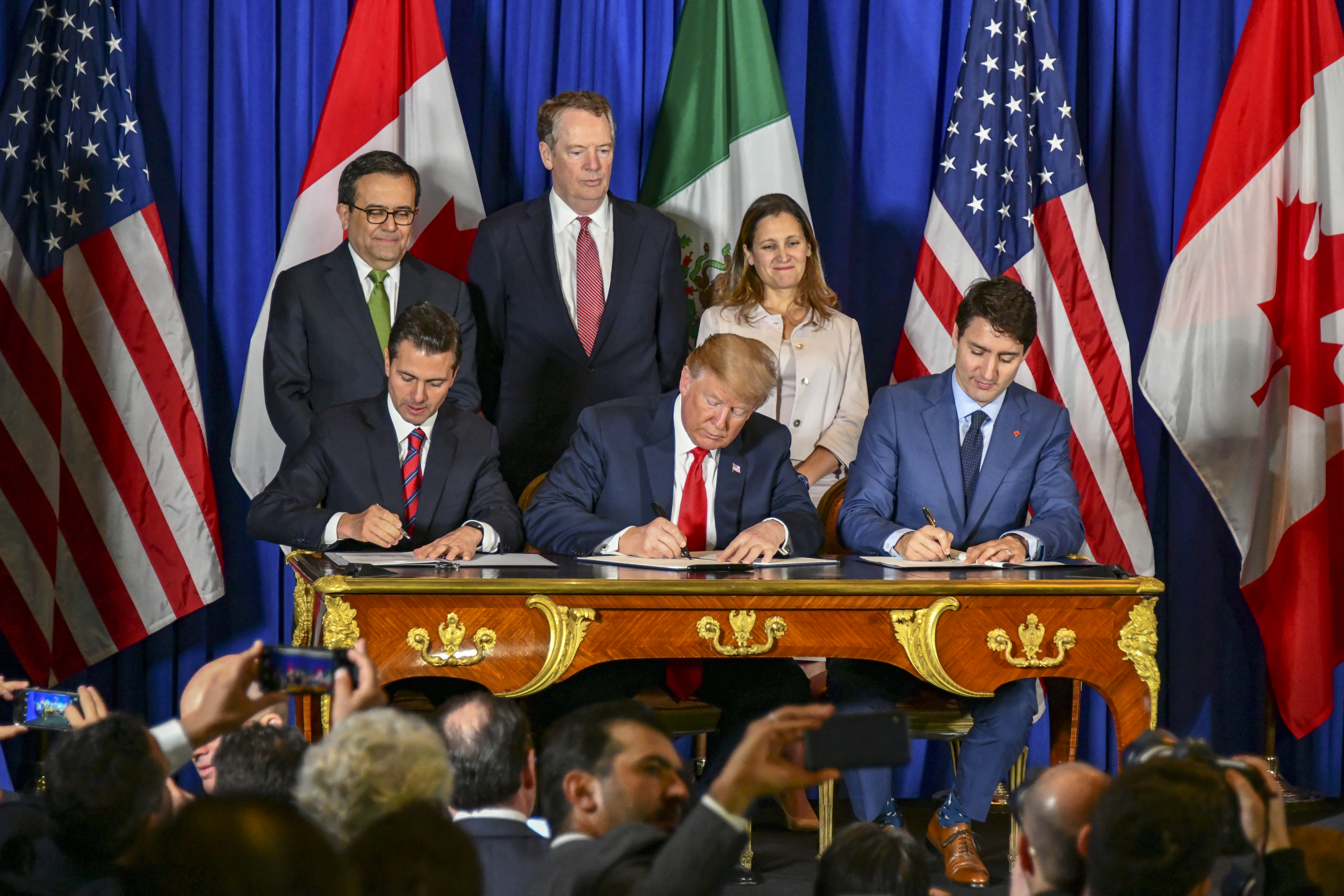
Signing the USMCA at the G-20 Leaders' Summit in Buenos Aires

- March 6 A White House Fact Sheet announced that there would be a 30-day reprieve on tariffs to "minimize disruption to the [American] automotive industry". Potash tariffs were reduced to 10%. Details included the maintenance of 25% tariffs on goods outside United States–Mexico–Canada Agreement (USMCA) rules; a reduction to 10% on Canadian energy products that are not protected under the USMCA; potash tariffs outside USMCA were reduced to 10%; all Canadian and Mexican goods regulated by USMCA will have no tariffs. (Note: The United States–Mexico–Canada Agreement (USMCA) went into effect on July 1, 2020, updated the 1994 North American Free Trade Agreement. The negotiations and signing of USMCA during his first term as president was considered to be a victory for Trump as it fulfilled a key campaign promise. In 2020, Trump said that, "The USMCA is the largest, most significant, modern, and balanced trade agreement in history. All of our countries will benefit greatly." The Office of the United States Trade Representative's official Fact Sheet said that USMCA "will support mutually beneficial trade leading to freer markets, fairer trade, and robust economic growth in North America." The region covered by USMCA is one of the world's largest free trade zones.) The New York Times said that the abrupt suspensions of tariffs covered most Canadian and Mexican products.

- – Canadian Finance Minister LeBlanc announced that Canada would postpone its intended second phase of retaliatory measures on C$125 billion worth of American goods, until April 2.
- – A BBC article described the tariffs and rollbacks as causing "uncertainty for businesses and worried financial markets". The article also repeated economists' warnings that the tariffs would cause "severe economic downturns in Mexico and Canada" and higher prices for American consumers.

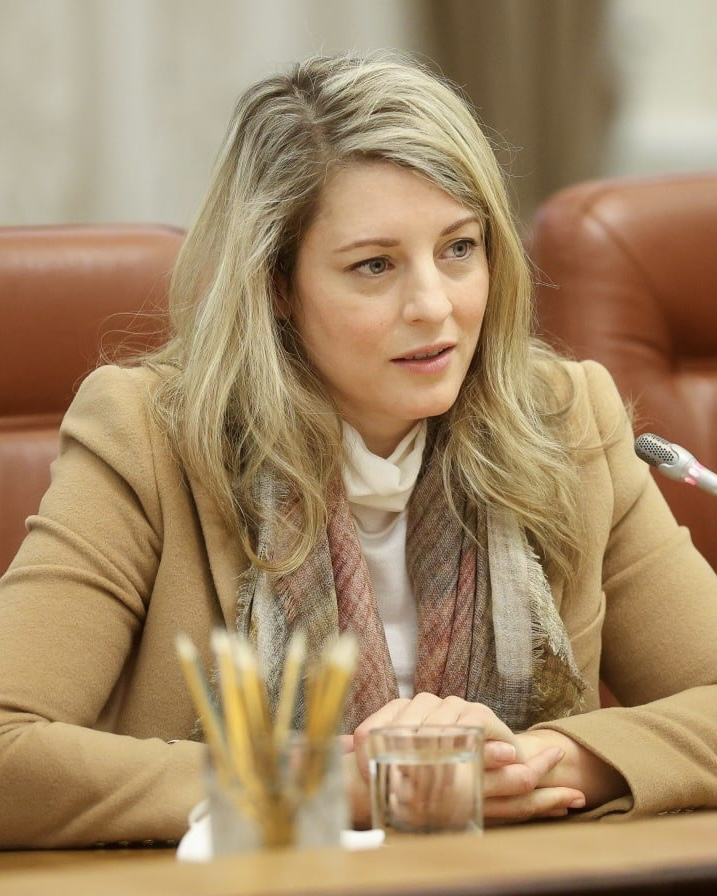
Canadian Foreign Minister Mélanie Joly in 2022.

- – In an interview with CNN's Christiane Amanpour Canadian Foreign Minister Mélanie Joly describes changes in trade talks following the February 3 phone calls between Trump and Trudeau.

- — The U.S. dollar experienced its steepest early-year decline since the 2008 financial crisis with the Dollar Index (DXY) falling 4.2% by the close on March 7. (Note: In the week of March 7 the Dollar Index (DXY) fell 4.2% which represented the steepest decline since the 2008 financial crisis in response to the implementation of tariffs on Canadian and Mexican goods. This ran counter to the goals of the Trump administration. As the value of the dollar declined, the Canadian dollar and the Mexican peso strengthened, and European currencies, like the euro surged. By March 13 the USD had fallen more than 5.5% since mid-January when it had reach a 2-year high. In the week of April 7, the U.S. dollar reached a 3-year low against the euro amid growing unease over Trump's unpredictable tariff policies. Despite rising U.S. Treasury bond yields, the dollar's divergence from the bonds suggests investors may be shifting assets abroad due to concerns about trade policy impacts.) This drop, largely occurring in that week, coincided with the implementation of tariffs on Canadian and Mexican goods—measures that unexpectedly strengthened both the Canadian dollar and the Mexican peso. Meanwhile, European currencies, particularly the euro, surged as the continent responds to U.S. tensions by boosting defense spending and stimulating economic growth. Despite these developments, the Trump administration continues to assert its commitment to policies aimed at strengthening the dollar.

- March 7
- The Canadian federal government announced the launch of Export Development Canada (EDC)'s Trade Impact Program (TIP) as part of an initial CA$6.5 billion, as well as an additional CA$5 billion over two years in support of Canadian businesses negatively impacted by U.S. tariffs.

- – The New York Times, the Toronto Star, and Global News explained the expanding list of Trump's grievances that were not related to the border.
- – A Bloomberg News article described the frequent reversals and rollouts, as "baffling" and ineffective.

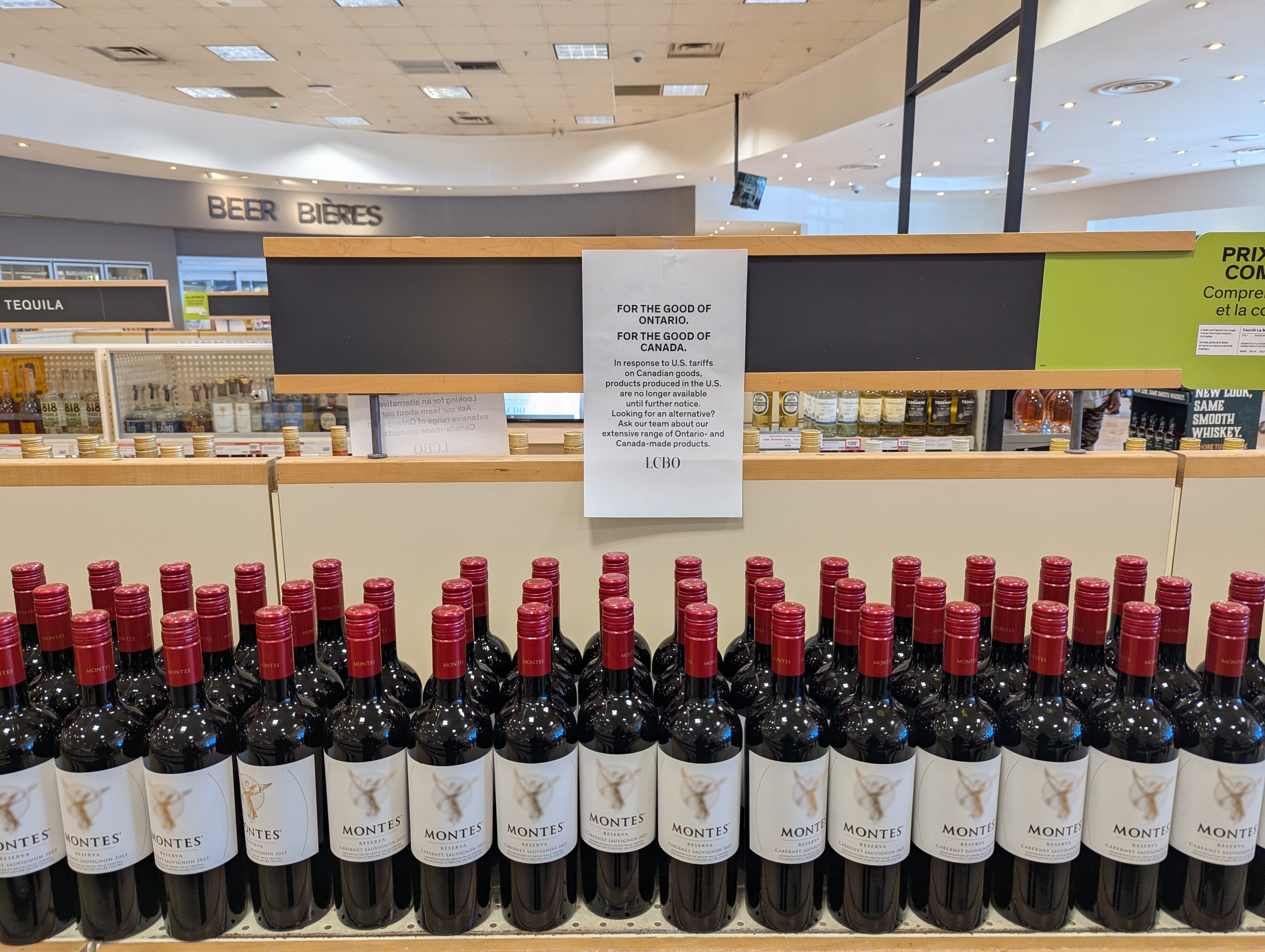
Boycott USA!

- March 9 In his final speech as Prime Minister, Trudeau warned that Canada was facing an existential crisis because of Trump's tariffs.

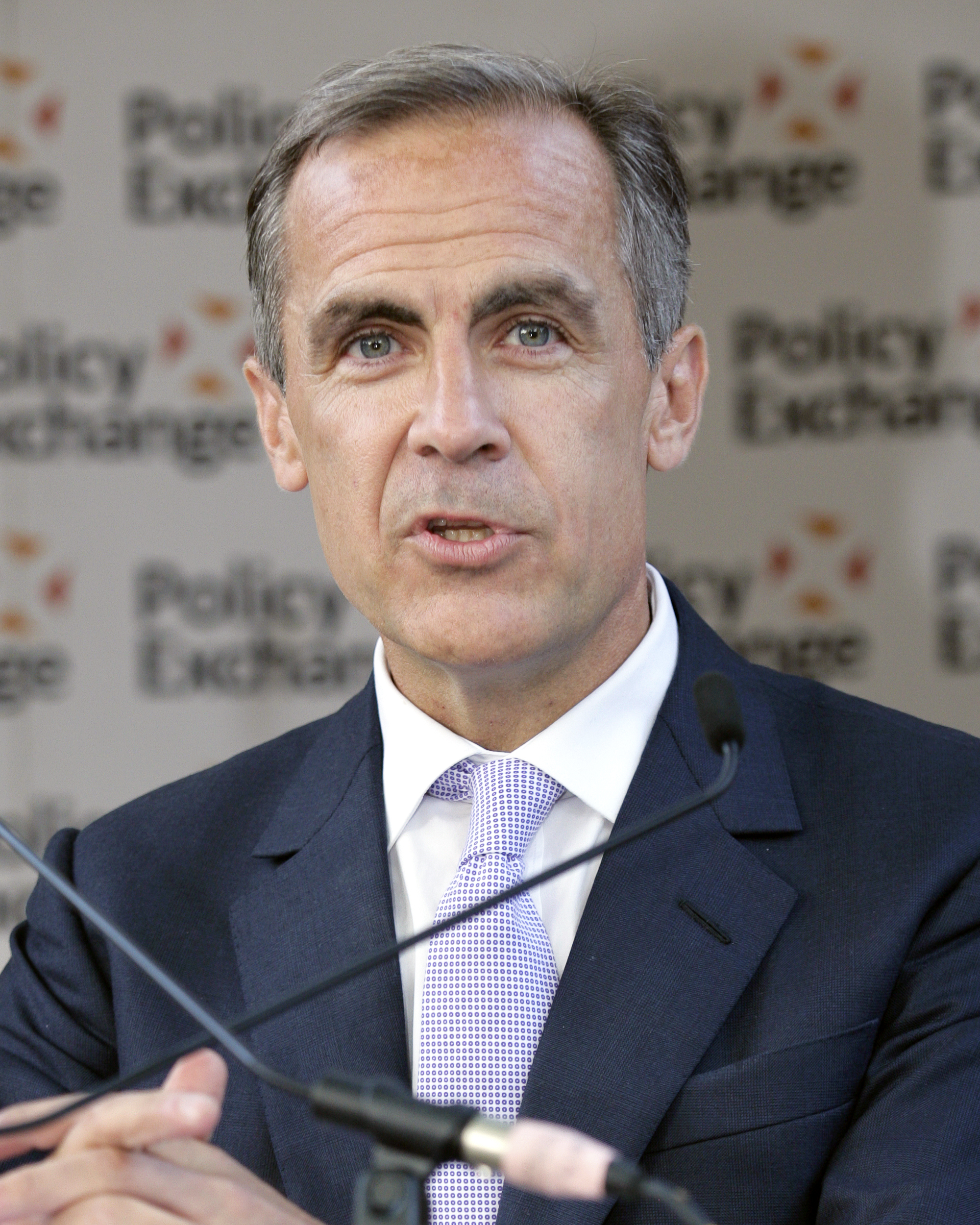
Mark Carney, Prime minister–designate of Canada

- – On March 9, 2025, Mark Carney was elected leader of the Liberal Party on the first ballot, winning 85.9% of the vote.
- – During his victory speech, Prime Minister designate and the new leader of the Liberal Party of Canada, Mark Carney, confirmed that he would maintain the retaliatory tariffs announced by Trudeau.
- – Bloomberg News said that while Trump is fulfilling a campaign promise to impose tariffs as his signature economic policy, he is using them to intimidate other countries as leverage in disputes unrelated to trade. In the 21st century global economy this represents a "dramatic shift" as most nation states with larger economies are working towards reducing, not increasing trade barriers.

- March 10 Trump's suggestion that there was a possibility of a recession in a Fox News interview is cited as causing investor fears and a decline in the S&P 500. Trade tensions are listed as one of the factors contributing to one of the worst single-day market performances since 2022. Since its peak in February, the S&P 500 lost US$4 trillion from the stock market sell-off.
- March 11 The S&P 500 dropped by 9% since its February 14 peak with the Nasdaq falling by 13%. According to The Economist, Trump's unpredictable trade policies, including tariffs on imports from Canada and Mexico caused the sell-off. Europe stocks are having their "strongest run in over 15 years" outperforming the United States.

- – Trump doubles the tariff on Canadian steel and aluminum to 50% starting on March 12 allegedly in response to the province of Ontario's threat of a retaliatory 25% tariff on electricity from Ontario exported to three American states.
- – Trump doubles the tariff on Canadian steel and aluminum to 50% starting on March 12 allegedly in response to the province of Ontario's threat of a relaliatory 25% tariff on electricity from Ontario exported to three American states. The tariffs on electricity were suspended.
- – The Canadian government sold US$3.5 billion worth of US Treasuries bonds to American investors.
- – Trump falsely claims on his Truth Social platform, that Canada is "one of the highest tariffing nations anywhere in the world", that there are "250% to 390% [tariffs] on various U.S. dairy products", and that the U.S. is subsidizing Canada to the tune of more than 200 Billion Dollars a year". His claims were refuted by a CNN political correspondent in a list of Trump's false claims about Canada, many of which are related to the trade war with Canada. This included Trump's claim without evidence that Canada is "one of the highest tariffing nations".

- March 12 A separate set of tariffs—25% on Canadian steel and aluminum exported to the United States—go into effect at midnight following "back-and-forth" threats and reversals on March 11. In response, Canadian announced that retaliatory tariffs valuing CA$29.8 billion (US$20 billion) on steel, aluminum, cast iron products and more will come into effect on March 13.
- March 13 The World Trade Organization (WTO) distributed to its member nations Canada's formal request for WTO's dispute resolution mechanisms against the United States for unfair trade practices in relation to the 25% tariffs imposed by the United States on Canadian steel and aluminum products which came into effect on March 12. These tariffs are inconsistent with and a violation of the United States' obligations under the 1994 General Agreement on Tariffs and Trade (GATT).
- March 14 In his first speech after having been officially sworn in, Prime Minister Carney said that his first priority is to protect Canada's workers and Canadian households faced with the United States "unjustified foreign trade actions". He said that he and President Trump have shared goals—to protect our workers and their jobs. His first official trip is to Europe to discuss security reinforcement and trade diversification.

- – Bloomberg reported that it only took 16 days for the S&P 500 index to slip into a correction—defined as a 10% decline from a recent high.

- March 15 — Prime Minister Carney and Bill Blair, Canada's defence minister, are investigating alternatives to the planned procurement of U.S.-based" Lockheed Martin's F-35 Lightning II jets in response to Trump's policy shifts. Tensions over tariffs have led to a rise in Canadian patriotism with consumers choosing to buy Canadian products and avoid American services and goods.
- March 17 — Prime Minister Carney met French President Emmanuel Macron and British Prime Minister Keir Starmer in France and London to discuss trade and security ties as a follow up to Trump's instigation of a trade war. In response to questions from the press, Carney said that in order for broader conversations between the United States and Canada on bilateral trade to take place, Trump had to stop the unhelpful and disrespectful comments about the 51st state.

- – According to The Economist, the American economy was currently in a state of uncertainty, with both positive and negative indicators causing concern among economists and policymakers. President Trump's policies, particularly his push for higher tariffs, have led to a sharp decline in the stock market and increased economic policy uncertainty, wiping out previous gains and potentially impacting consumer spending and inflation.
- – In an Asahi Shimbun article cited by The Economist, the Japanese newspaper's editorial board called Trump's tariffs a "reckless manipulation of trade policy" that violate WTO rules and bilateral trade agreements. The editors called on major countries to unite against the tariffs, to strengthen the WTO, and to uphold its rules.

- March 19 — As part of the process of reducing its dependence on the United States, Canada is in advanced talks with the European Union to gain preferential access to military equipment. European Union's plans to increase military spending could include 35% of components being supplied by Canada.

- – According to The Economist, the Trump administration is "extraordinarily blasé" about the loss of US$4.5 trillion in stockmarket value—representing an 8% loss since the S&P's February peak. The Economist cautions that this will potentially result in consumer spending falling by billions of dollars in 2025.

- March 22 — A CBC investigation underscores how misinformation is affecting U.S.-Canada trade talks. Ambassador Kirsten Hillman, economist Trevor Tombe, and Al Mussell of Agri-Food Economic Systems point to misleading narratives—such as inflated claims about Canadian dairy tariffs—as a source of tension. These distortions fuel public pressure on American policymakers to confront supposed trade injustices that don't align with the actual agreements. As a result, negotiators must navigate between fact-based policymaking and the political fallout of misinformation, increasing the risk of prolonged or unnecessary disputes.
- March 26 — A White House fact sheet was published announcing upcoming tariffs on cars and car components.
- March 27 — United States allies worldwide criticized Donald Trump's March 27 announcement of 25% global tariffs on automobiles and automotive components, set to take effect on April 3. Analysts warned the measures risked sparking a global trade conflict. In response, Prime Minister Carney stated: "The era of close economic integration and security cooperation with the United States has ended... Our strategy involves combatting these tariffs, safeguarding Canadian interests, and strengthening domestic industries. We will implement retaliatory trade measures designed to maximize U.S. consequences while minimizing domestic fallout." At a rally of supporters in Laurier-Sainte-Marie, Quebec, Carney said the United States was "no longer a reliable partner". He called on Canadians to "fundamentally reimagine our economy", to "dramatically reduce our dependence on the United States", and to "build new trading partnerships elsewhere".
- March 28 — A Friday morning phone call between Prime Minister Carney and President Trump was the first since Carney became Prime Minister. Carney described the call as "positive, cordial, constructive — exactly what we want." He said while they had "made progress", this was "the beginning of negotiations". On Truth Social immediately after the phone call, Trump said that they the call had been "extremely productive...we agree on many things." He added that they will "begin comprehensive negotiations about a new economic and security relationship" after the upcoming 2025 Canadian federal election. On the same day he later told reporters that "Many countries have taken advantage of us," but not Canada...I think things will work out very well between Canada and the United States".

=== April ===
- April 2 — The United States Senate voted 51–48 to pass a resolution sponsored by Senator Tim Kaine that sought to end an alleged national emergency at the northern border, which Trump had declared on February 1 under the International Emergency Economic Powers Act (IEEPA) to address alleged fentanyl smuggling. Kaine dismissed the emergency as a "made-up" justification for tariffs on Canada, arguing that it was being used to generate revenue for tax cuts benefiting billionaires. Kaine stated, "This is not about fentanyl. It's about tariffs. It's about a national sales tax on American families." All Democratic senators and four Republicans voted in favour. However, the resolution is largely symbolic, as it is unlikely to advance in the Republican-controlled United States House of Representatives. Maine Senator Susan Collins supported the resolution stating that Maine would lose 510 irreplaceable paper mill jobs because of the tariffs. She noted that the southern, not the northern boundary is where the majority of fentanyl comes into the United States. The resolution also represents a rare rebuke of Trump's trade policies and highlights divisions within the Republican Party regarding tariffs.

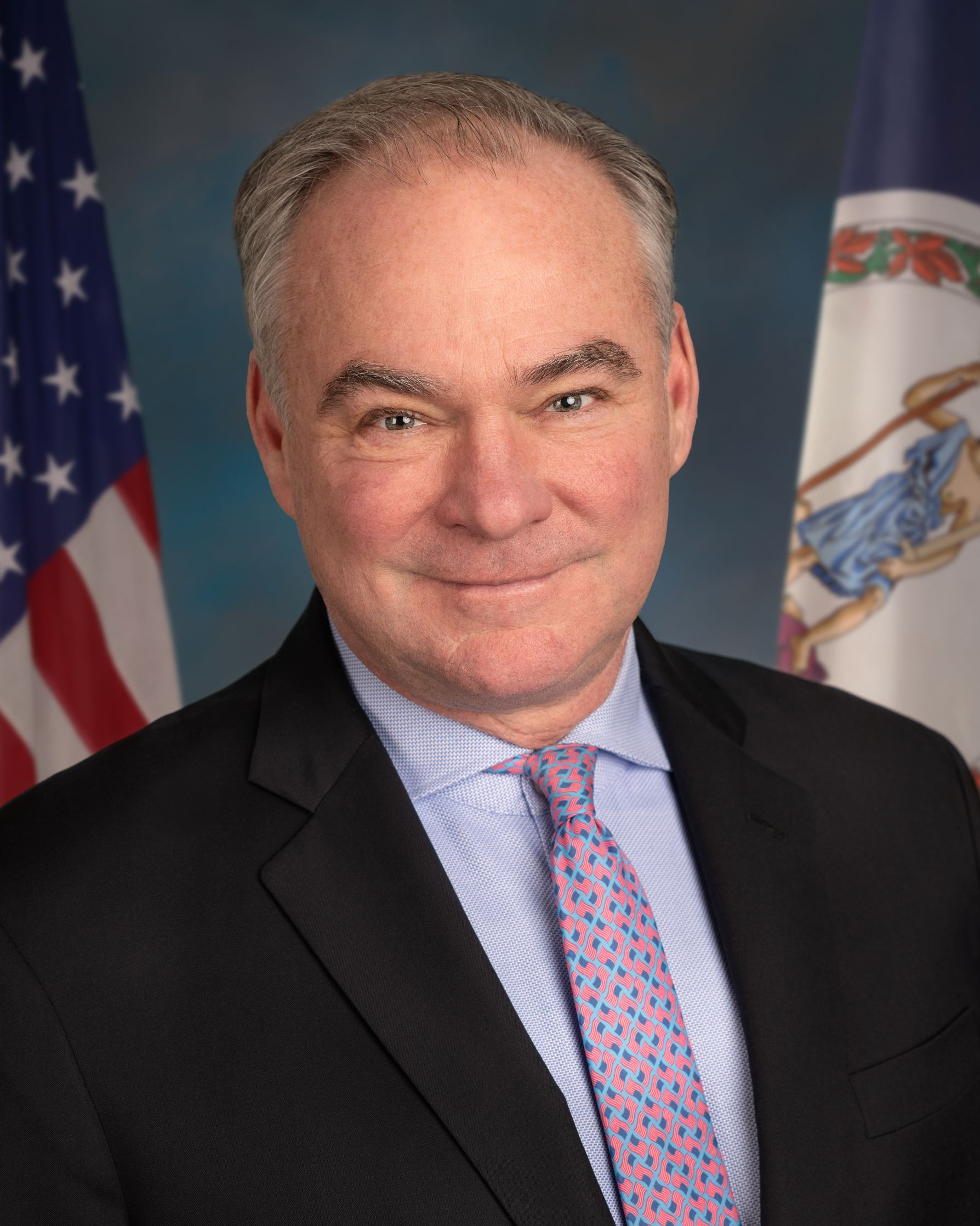
Tim Kaine

- April 3 — In response to the tariffs imposed by Trump, Carney said in a speech in Ottawa, "The global economy is fundamentally different today than it was yesterday. The system of global trade anchored on the United States that Canada has relied on since the end of the Second World War—a system that, while not perfect, has helped to deliver prosperity for our country for decades—is over. Our old relationship of steadily deepening integration with the United States is over. The 80-year period when the United States embraced the mantle of global economic leadership, when it forged alliances rooted in trust and mutual respect, and championed the free and open exchange of goods and services, is over." Carney imposed 25% tariffs on auto and autoparts to match Trump's tariffs.
- April 7 — In the early days of the 2025 stock market crash, the S&P 500 briefly neared bear market—the critical 20% threshold—closing almost 19% below its February 19 record high as optimism faded for a resolution to the escalating global tariff war.
  - — Canada requests a second WTO dispute consultation with the U.S. over Trump's decision to impose a 25% duty on cars and car parts from Canada, claiming the measures are inconsistent with U.S. obligations under the General Agreement on Tariffs and Trade.
- April 9 — Canadian retaliatory tariffs came into effect.

Trump announced a 90-day reprieve on tariffs via Truth Social.
Contrary to the White House announcement which led to confusion, Katie Simpson, CBC News foreign correspondent based in Washington, confirmed that Canada and Mexico are not subject to a 10% baseline tariff.

- April 10 — Global markets experienced a sharp downturn. The S&P 500 dropped approximately 15%, while long-term Treasury bonds faced significant selling pressure. Additionally, the U.S. dollar, traditionally considered a safe-haven asset, weakened amidst the turmoil. The Economist criticized Trump's replacement of the century-old "stable trading relations" with policymaking that is both "whimsical and arbitrary" where social media is the vehicle for announcing decisions and even people who are there to advise him cannot predict his next actions.

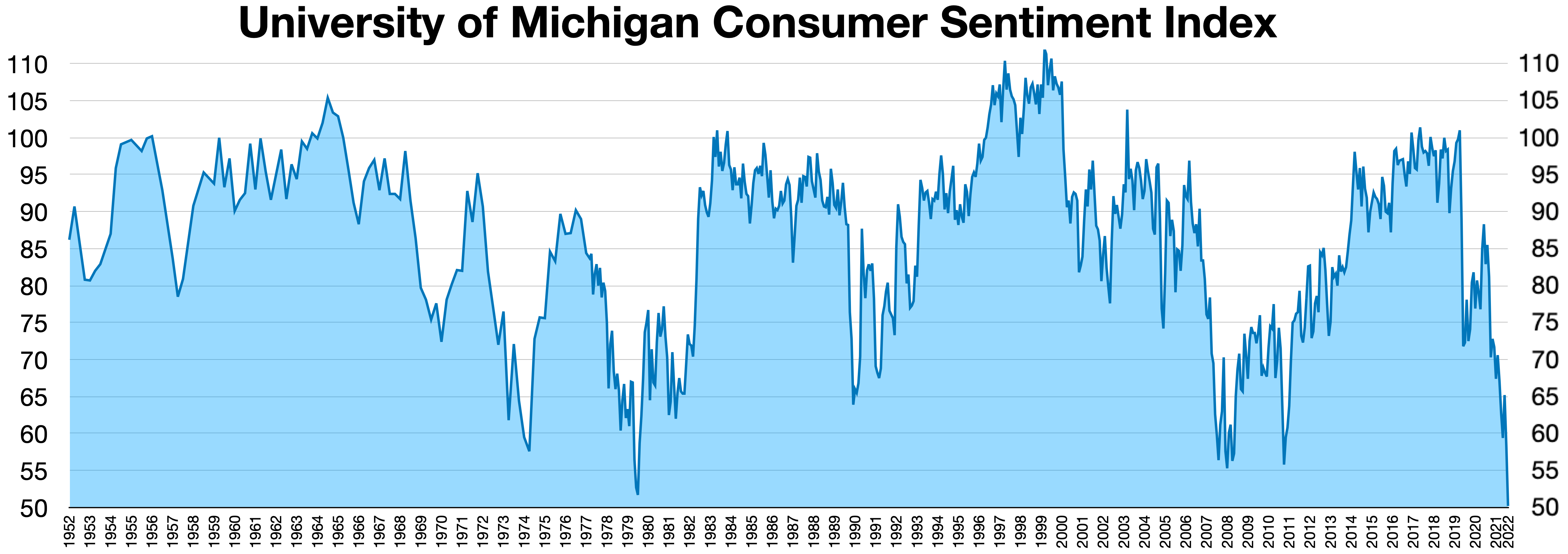
Consumer Sentiment Index

- April 11 — The University of Michigan Consumer Sentiment Index plunged to 50.8, marking the second-lowest level since records began in 1952, surpassing only the 50.0 reading from June 2022, in response to Trump's "volatile trade war". U.S. consumers displayed a rare level of pessimism about the U.S. economy and the threat of a higher inflation.
- April 15 — Canada announces a 6-month pause on tariffs for goods imported from the U.S. that are used in Canadian manufacturing, processing and food and beverage packaging, and for those used to support public health, health care, public safety, and national security objectives.
  - — Canada announces that automakers that keep building in Canada will receive an exemption from Canada's retaliatory tariffs.
  - — Canada's Large Enterprise Tariff Loan Facility (LETL) program begins accepting applicants. LETL supports eligible large businesses struggling to obtain financing by providing access to liquidity.

=== May ===
- May 3 — A 25% U.S. tariff on imported auto parts takes effect, but auto parts made in Canada or Mexico compliant with the USMCA are exempted.
- May 6 — Newly elected Canadian Prime Minister Mark Carney met with President Trump in the Oval Office. This was their first in-person meeting amid the lowest point in decades for bilateral relations and ongoing trade hostilities.
  - — Canada's trade deficit with the United States narrowed to $CA506 million in March, a significant decrease from previous months. Imports fell at a faster rate than the drop in exports. Exports to the U.S. dropped 6.6% in March, marking the second consecutive monthly decline, but this was nearly offset by a 24.8% increase in exports to countries other than the U.S.
- May 22 — In April, Canada exported more seaborne crude oil to China than to the United States for the first time, according to Reuters. In response to Trump's tariffs Canada has been diversifying its export markets. At the same time, Canada's Trans Mountain pipeline has significantly increased the country's capacity for seaborne crude exports. With U.S. sanctions on its other heavy crude oil supplier—Venezuela—the U.S. is even more dependent on Canadian crude. China has largely halted imports of U.S. crude amid heightened tariffs, while maintaining a 10% levy on American oil rendering U.S. crude as uncompetitive in the Chinese market. These developments underscore how U.S. trade policy has led to unintended consequences.
- May 28 — The United States Court of International Trade ruled in favour of two lawsuits filed by the Liberty Justice Center. One lawsuit was filed on behalf of several small American companies that import goods and the second was on behalf of 13 U.S. states. The Court ruled that Trump's use of emergency powers to apply tariffs was unlawful, emphasizing that tariffs imposed via emergency powers (IEEPA) require a direct link to the declared threat, which the fentanyl-related tariffs lacked. Duties under Section 232 of the Trade Expansion Act (25% on steel, 10% on aluminum, and 25% on autos) remain in place, as they were authorized under a separate legal framework.

=== June ===
- June 3 — Trump signed an EO announcing an increase on tariffs on steel and aluminum products from all countries except the United Kingdom, effective June 4, 2025, from 25% to 50%.
  - Steel magnate Barry Zekelman, a Canadian-born, US-based Trump supporter, briefed Canadian cabinet ministers in Ottawa, urging an 80% cut to foreign steel imports. He also backed Trump's move to raise steel and aluminum tariffs to 50%, blaming Ottawa for the damage to Canada's steel industry.
- June 19 — The head of the Canadian Steel Producers Association said the 25% tariffs created a severe setback for Canada's steel sector with widespread layoffs, reduced investment, and a sharp decline in shipments to the U.S. With the tariff doubling to 50%, the U.S. market would be essentially inaccessible for Canadian steel, leaving billions of dollars' worth of product without a destination.
  - — While Carney and Trump pursue a trade deal within the next 30 days, Carney said that if a deal is not reached by then, he will impose counter-tariffs or adjust existing ones on U.S. steel and aluminum.
- June 27 — Trump abruptly ended all trade negotiations with Canada and threatened new tariffs, citing the pending implementation on June 30 of a Digital Service Tax (DST) targeting major U.S. technology firms.
- June 29 — Carney announced that the DST would be cancelled in order to resume trade talks.
- June 30 — Hassett announced that the United States will resume trade talks with Canada after they cancel their DST on U.S. technology firms.
  - — June 2025 marked a historic shift where Canada increased its automotive imports from Mexico, as a consequence of the trade tensions and tariffs introduced by the Trump administration. Based on data from Statistics Canada, because of the tariff war, for the first time since the early 1990s, Canada imported more vehicles from Mexico (CAD $1.08 billion) than from the United States (CAD $950 million).

=== July ===
- July 10 — Despite a notably cordial relationship between Trump and Carney, trade negotiations experienced renewed turbulence. On Thursday evening, Trump threatened to increase tariffs on Canadian goods to 35% starting August 1, 2025.
- July 11 — In June, Canada's unemployment rate unexpectedly declined from 7.0% to 6.9% as the economy added 83,000 jobs, marking the first decrease since January despite ongoing U.S. tariffs and trade tensions.
- July 31 — According to RBC, Canada's economy contracted for two straight months in April and May 2025, largely due to temporary oil sector disruptions, while Statistics Canada's early estimate for June suggests a modest rebound and hints at weak but positive Q2 growth. Despite significant external pressures such as U.S. tariffs, CUSMA exemptions and steady domestic demand have helped Canada avoid recession and maintain gradual economic expansion through the year.

=== August ===
- August 1 — According to Le Monde, Trump raised tariffs to 35% on Canadian goods not protected by USMCA in response to Carney's plans to recognize a Palestinian state.
- August 18 — The United States significantly expanded its Section 232 tariffs by adding over 400 Harmonized Tariff Schedule (HTS) codes to the existing list of steel and aluminum derivative products. These new tariffs apply immediately, with a 50% ad valorem tariff on the metal content of impacted products. There is no exception for goods already in transit, meaning all affected goods crossing the border are subject to the new rates.
- 'August 29 — Nearly all Canadian retaliatory counter-tariffs on U.S. goods were lifted through Orders in Council effective September 1, 2025, with exceptions maintained for steel, aluminum, and automotive sectors. CBC reported that these removals went further than previously announced by Prime Minister Carney on August 22, reflecting a decision to streamline tariff administration and avoid the high compliance and enforcement costs associated with broader measures.

=== September ===
- September According to a September Anderson Economic Group report, in July 2025, U.S. tariffs on Canadian vehicles and auto parts surged dramatically, with over US$380 million in duties imposed that month, a substantial increase from prior months as previous exemptions under the Canada-United States-Mexico Agreement largely ended. The portion of Canadian-made vehicles able to enter the U.S. without tariffs fell dramatically from nearly all exports to just over one-third in July.
- 4 September According to Bloomberg News, Zekelman pushed for Canada to take a more conciliatory approach toward the Trump administration's trade war. Bloomberg noted that Zekelman was "the rare Canadian likely to benefit" from the tariffs, since his company's manufacturing base is largely located in the United States.

=== October ===
- October 1 According to British Columbia Premier David Eby, despite ongoing Western sanctions on Russian goods, the additional 10% tariffs on exports of B.C. softwood lumber to the United States scheduled to take effect on October 14, 2025, will result in tariffs on Russian lumber imports being lower than those imposed on Canadian lumber.
- October 23 Ontario Premier Ford's $75 million anti-tariff ad campaign in the U.S. featured Ronald Reagan 1987 Radio Address on Free and Fair Trade warning that tariffs hurt American workers. In response, Trump announced on Truth Social that he was terminating trade talks with Canada, calling the ad "fraudulent" and "egregious". After speaking with Carney, Ford agreed to pause the campaign on 27 October to reopen the path for negotiations. The ads will air on October 25 and October 26 during the Major League Baseball World Series.
- October 25 The United States imposed a 10% tariff increase on a wide range of Canadian goods as part of Trump's retaliation for the ad campaign which he described as a "hostile act".
- October 29 On October 29, 2025, the United States Senate voted 50–46 to pass a resolution that would nullify tariffs imposed on Canadian imports, with four Republicans joining Democrats in a rare rebuke of President Trump's trade policy. The resolution, however, faces obstacles in the House and a threatened presidential veto, highlighting uncertainty in efforts to de-escalate the ongoing trade conflict.

=== December ===
- December 11 According to the Royal Bank of Canada, Canada's trade balance returned to surplus in September as exports recovered, particularly to markets outside the United States, while the impact of U.S. tariffs eased in some sectors. The rebound in exports contributed to economic growth in the third quarter, with improved job numbers and consumer spending supporting a cautiously positive outlook despite ongoing trade and productivity challenges.

== 2026 ==
=== January ===
- January 20 In his speech at the World Economic Forum in Davos, Switzerland, Carney described Canada's pragmatic approach to the "rupture, not a transition" of the post–Cold War era's rules-based world order. He called for greater cooperation between the world's middle powers to protect themselves from great powers using tariffs as leverage.
- January 24 U.S. President Donald Trump threatened to impose tariffs of up to 100% on all Canadian goods in response to reports of a planned trade agreement between Canada and China. Carney said that he is not and has never sought a Canada-China free-trade deal. The arrangement between Ottawa and Beijing is a limited, issue-specific tariff agreement that swaps reduced Chinese duties on Canadian canola seeds for lower Canadian tariffs on a capped volume of Chinese electric vehicles, rather than a comprehensive Canada–China free trade agreement covering most goods and services.
- 26 January —The federal government announced a plan to significantly expand trade with non‑U.S. countries, strengthen internal Canadian trade, and increase domestic investment by up to one trillion dollars over the next five years.

=== February ===
- 12 February —Media reports indicate that Canada is leading discussions between the European Union and the Indo-Pacific club, known as the Comprehensive and Progressive Agreement for Trans-Pacific Partnership (CPTPP), to explore a large trade alliance, which commentators describe as partly motivated by recent U.S. tariff policies.
- 20 February — The Supreme Court of the United States ruled against emergency tariffs imposed under IEEPA in Learning Resources, Inc. v. Trump. Trump responded by imposing a short term 10% global tariff. Most Canadian trade protected CUSMA‑compliant will not be affected but Canada remains exposed to more targeted U.S. tariff actions.
- 26 February —CBC News published an overview of the U.S. tariffs on Canadian exports that remained in force following the Supreme Court's decision striking down several of President Trump's broader trade measures. The article noted that sector‑specific duties imposed under Section 232 of the Trade Expansion Act still applied to key Canadian exports, including 50 per cent tariffs on steel and aluminum, additional 232 tariffs on semi‑finished copper products, upholstered furniture, kitchen cabinets, vanities, softwood lumber and buses, while a new 10 per cent tariff under Section 122 of the Trade Act covered other Canadian exports not already captured by those measures or exempted under CUSMA. Under Section 122, if there are "large and serious United States balance-of-payments deficits" the president can impose temporary tariffs.
  - —Bloomberg News and TD Economics Bloomberg News and TD Economics reported that foreign direct investment (FDI) into Canada totalled $96.8 billion in 2025, the highest annual inflow since 2007, even as trade tensions with the United States continued. TD Economics noted that U.S. inflows, which reached $52.5 billion in 2025, were concentrated in trade and transportation, management companies, and manufacturing, and argued that Canada remained an attractive destination for foreign investment despite trade‑policy uncertainty.

US consumer sentiment hit new lows in spring of 2026.

=== April ===
- 6 April Effective 6 April 2026, the United States restructured its Section 232 tariffs on aluminum, steel and copper, lowering or removing duties for some derivative products while extending full‑value tariffs, including a 50% rate on many core metal imports.

=== May ===
- 1 May Prime Minister Carney says Canada will not use energy or critical minerals as 'leverage' in upcoming CUSMA review talks with the United States, responding to U.S. Trade Representative Jamieson Greer's warning against using those sectors as bargaining chips.

=== July ===
- 1 July Following a virtual meeting with U.S. Trade Representative Jamieson Greer with his Canadian and Mexican counterparts, Greer announced that the U.S. will not extend CUSMA.
- 17 July President Trump, in a Truth Social post, threatened to put on Canada over wildfire smoke drifting into the U.S caused by the 2026 Canadian wildfires. The president says he will call Prime Minister Carney to discuss the matter further.
- 20 July Citing discriminatory Canadian treatment of American cars, alcohol, and dairy, President Trump signed three proclamations under Section 338 of the 1930 Smoot–Hawley Tariff Act, imposing 50% tariffs on specific categories of Canadian goods—including autos, alcohol, dairy, and other products—with no exemption for USMCA-compliant goods. The announced date on which these tariffs would come into effect was 19 August.

=== August ===
- 19 August Following a briefing with Prime Minister Mark Carney on Canada–U.S. trade talks, Saskatchewan Premier Scott Moe told reporters that Donald Trump's threatened 50 per cent tariff on nearly $30 billion of Canadian goods was "not coming into effect." Moe said bilateral negotiations were continuing and that Canada was still pursuing reductions to existing sectoral tariffs, adding that the current CUSMA agreement was no longer viable in its original form and that a new deal was needed to secure preferred Canadian access to the U.S. market.
- 22 August United States tariffs of 50 per cent took effect on about US$20 billion of Canadian goods, including some dairy products, alcoholic beverages, cement and hockey equipment, after trade negotiations collapsed shortly before a midnight deadline the previous night. U.S. Customs and Border Protection told importers that its officers would enforce the new rates immediately. Prime Minister Mark Carney attributed the breakdown to "last-minute changes in the U.S. proposed terms" that he called "unfair, uneconomic, and called into question the reliability of any deal", said that Canada would match the tariffs "dollar for dollar" from 8 September, and told a news conference the following day: "You're at war when you get attacked. We got attacked."
- 25 August The Department of Finance published the list of United States products subject to Canadian counter-tariffs, imposing rates of 15, 25 and 50 per cent on goods covering CA$27.6 bn (US$19.9 bn) of imports from the United States. The department said the measures matched the U.S. Section 338 and Section 232 tariffs dollar for dollar, with each product's rate set to the corresponding U.S. rate, and that they were concentrated on steel, dairy, appliances, agricultural equipment, pulp and paper, and electronics. The counter-tariffs take effect at 12:01 a.m. on 8 September 2026, apply only to goods originating in the United States, and do not apply to goods already in transit to Canada when they come into force.

== U.S. tariffs and Canadian retaliatory tariffs ==
United States tariffs
Tariff	Announced	Effective	Status	Delayed
25% tariff on most Canadian goods	February 1, 2025	April 3, 2025	In effect	On March 6, Trump delayed tariffs until April 2 on goods that are protected under the United States–Mexico–Canada Agreement (USMCA) representing 38% of Canadian goods as of 2024. This 30-day reprieve on tariffs was intended to "minimize disruption to the [American] automotive industry".
10% tariff on Canadian oil, gas, and potash	February 1, 2025	April 3, 2025	In effect	Tariff delayed until April 2. On March 6, tariff on Canadian potash lowered to 10% tariff.
50% tariffs on steel and aluminum products	February 10, 2025 (orig 25%)	June 4, 2025	In effect	Admin plans to eventually include copper.
25% Auto and auto parts	March 26	April 3	In effect	Tariffs will be imposed on all passenger vehicles and light trucks imported into the U.S. that are not manufactured domestically, excluding components that originate from the U.S. Key auto parts like engines, transmissions, and electrical components became subject to tariffs on May 3, but USMCA-compliant parts were exempt.
50% tariff on Canadian motor vehicles, alcohol, dairy, and other goods (Section 338)	July 20, 2026	August 22, 2026	In effect	Three separate proclamations under Section 338 of the Tariff Act of 1930, citing discriminatory Canadian treatment of U.S. autos, alcohol, and dairy. Coverage extends beyond those categories to goods such as cement and hockey sticks. Applies even to USMCA-compliant goods, with no USMCA exemption. Excludes energy, potash, fish, critical minerals, and goods already tariffed under Section 232. The tariffs took effect after trade negotiations collapsed shortly before a midnight deadline.
Proposed U.S. tariffs
Reciprocal tariffs	February 13, 2025			Trump admin says reciprocal tariffs will begin April 2
Canadian lumber	March 1, 2025			Trump asked Lutnick to investigate whether imports of lumber threaten America's national security.
241% tariffs on dairy products	March 7, 2025	n.d.	Delayed	Under the USMCA, Canada imposes a sliding scale 241% tariff on certain dairy products applied after U.S. dairy exports reach a specific quota which has never been reached. According to the International Dairy Foods Association (IDFA), the United States transitioned over the last decade from a potential trade imbalance in dairy products to becoming a net exporter with an increase in 2024 to US$8 billion in exports to 140 countries, accounting for 17% of U.S. dairy production, with Canada importing US$1 billion. (Note: Canada imposes high tariffs of up to 241% on certain dairy products structured on a sliding scale that only applies after U.S. dairy exports reach a specific quota—a level that has never been met due to Canada's supply management system for its domestic dairy industry which has been a source of frustration to some American dairy farmers and politicians. However, the International Dairy Foods Association has raised concerns that a prolonged tariff war would have a detrimental effect on United States' dairy farmers and processors. In 2023, a trade dispute panel ruled in favor of Canada, determining that these high import taxes did not violate the USMCA. Wisconsin Senator Tammy Baldwin, criticized the ruling saying that it unfairly burdened her state's dairy industry. Forty percent of American dairy products were sold to Canada or Mexico.)
Canadian retaliatory tariffs on U.S.
Canadian retaliation	Announced	Effective	Status	Notes
25% on CA$30 bn (US$20.8 bn) of U.S. goods in effect.	February 1, 2025	March 4, 2025	In effect	25% on CA$30 bn (US$20.8 bn) of U.S. goods in effect. A planned expansion to an additional CA$125 bn (US$86 bn) worth of U.S. goods was delayed on March 6.
25% tariffs on CA$29.8 bn (US$20.6 bn) of U.S. goods: CA$12.6 bn (US$8.7 bn) steel products, CA$3 bn (US$2 bn) aluminum products, and CA$14.2 bn (US$9.9 bn) misc. goods.	March 12, 2025	March 13, 2025	In effect	25% tariffs on CA$29.8 bn (US$20.6 bn) of U.S. goods: CA$12.6 bn (US$8.7 bn) steel products, CA$3 bn (US$2 bn) aluminum products, and CA$14.2 bn (US$9.9 bn) misc. goods.
25% tariffs on auto and autoparts	April 3	April 9	In effect	This is a matching tariff on United States-made cars and components. (Note: To qualify under the Canada-U.S.-Mexico Agreement (CUSMA), a vehicle must contain at least 75% North American parts by value. Approximately 90% of U.S. and Canadian vehicles currently meet this standard. Canada's retaliatory tariffs apply differently based on compliance: CUSMA-compliant vehicles: A 25% levy targets only the non-Canadian components (e.g., 40% of a car's value being U.S.-made would face tariffs on that 40%). Non-compliant vehicles: The full 25% tariff applies to the entire vehicle. Manufacturers must document the origin and value of every component, a process acknowledged as administratively burdensome.)
15%, 25% and 50% tariffs on CA$27.6 bn (US$19.9 bn) of U.S. goods	August 25, 2026	September 8, 2026	Scheduled	The measures match U.S. Section 338 and Section 232 tariffs dollar for dollar and apply only to goods originating in the United States, including steel, dairy, appliances, agricultural equipment, pulp and paper, and electronics. On September 7, the Prime Minister's Office said no calls were scheduled between Mark Carney and Donald Trump and no Canadian negotiators were scheduled to return to talks before the 12:01 a.m. deadline.

See also Bloomberg News's dynamic tariff tracker.

== See also ==
- Canada–China trade war
- China–United States trade war
- Tariffs in the second Trump administration

== Canadian official agencies ==
- "Canada announces entry into force of countermeasures against auto imports from the United States" (news releases). Department of Finance. April 8, 2025.
- "List of products from the United States subject to counter-tariffs effective September 8, 2026" (backgrounder). Department of Finance. August 25, 2026.
- Mark Carney (March 9, 2025). Liberal Leadership: Mark Carney delivers victory speech. Event occurs at 31:34.
- Mark Carney (March 14, 2025). Mark Carney promises action against Donald Trump's tariffs in first speech as prime minister.
- "CBSA launches Operation Blizzard to target fentanyl and other synthetic narcotics" (news releases). Canada Border Services Agency. February 27, 2025.
- "U.S. federal court rules against Trump's fentanyl and 'Liberation Day' tariffs". CityNews Toronto. May 28, 2025.
- "Canada won't 'leverage' energy, critical minerals in trade talks: PM". The Canadian Press. Ottawa, Ontario. May 1, 2026 – via CTVNews.
- Mark Carney (March 27, 2025). Mark Carney Speaks at Rally in Montreal. CPAC.
- "Protecting Jobs and Our Economy". Backgrounders. Department of Finance of Canada. December 16, 2024.
- "Canada announces robust tariff package in response to unjustified U.S. tariffs" (news releases). Department of Finance Canada. March 4, 2025.
- "First Ministers' statement on the Canada-United States relationship". Prime Minister of Canada. January 15, 2025.
- "The Canada-United States-Mexico Agreement". GAC. February 2, 2025 [2022]. "the largest free trade region in the world"
- Global Affairs Canada (February 6, 2025). "Canada's engagement with the United States". GAC.
- "Prime Minister announces the appointment of Canada's new Fentanyl Czar". Prime Minister of Canada. November 2, 2025.
- Justin Trudeau (February 1, 2025). Prime Minister Justin Trudeau announces Canada's response to U.S. tariffs – February 1, 2025. Event occurs at 32:52.
- "'Elbows up': Trudeau warns Canada of 'existential' threat from U.S. in final speech as PM". Global News. March 9, 2025.

=== The White House ===
- "President Donald J. Trump's United States-Mexico-Canada Agreement Delivers a Historic Win for American Workers". The White House. January 29, 2020.
- "Imposing Duties to Address the Flow of Illicit Drugs Across Our Northern Border". The White House. February 1, 2025.
- "Fact Sheet: President Donald J. Trump Imposes Tariffs on Imports from Canada, Mexico and China". The White House. February 1, 2025.
- "Adjusting Imports of Steel into The United States". The White House. February 11, 2025.
- "Fact Sheet: President Donald J. Trump Restores Section 232 Tariffs". The White House. February 11, 2025.
- "Progress on the Situation at Our Northern Border". The White House. February 3, 2025.
- "Fact Sheet: President Donald J. Trump Adjusts Tariffs on Canada and Mexico to Minimize Disruption to the Automotive Industry". The White House. March 6, 2025.
- "Amendment to Duties to Address the Flow of Illicit Drugs across our Northern Border". The White House. March 3, 2025.
- "Amendment to Duties to Address the Flow of Illicit Drugs Across Our Northern Border". The White House. March 6, 2025.
- "Fact Sheet: President Donald J. Trump Adjusts Imports of Automobiles and Automobile Parts into the United States". The White House. March 26, 2025.
- "Fact Sheet: President Donald J. Trump Increases Section 232 Tariffs on Steel and Aluminum". The White House. June 3, 2025f.
- "Fact Sheet: President Donald J. Trump Amends Duties to Address the Flow of Illicit Drugs Across our Northern Border". The White House. July 31, 2025.
- "Fact Sheet: President Donald J. Trump Imposes Additional Tariffs on Canada". The White House. July 20, 2026.

=== Truth Social ===
- "As everyone is aware, thousands of people are pouring through Mexico and Canada, bringing Crime and Drugs at levels never seen before. Right now a Caravan coming from Mexico, composed of thousands of people, seems to be unstoppable in its quest to come through our currently Open Border. On January 20th, as one of my many first Executive Orders, I will sign all necessary documents to charge Mexico and Canada a 25% Tariff on ALL products coming into the United States, and its ridiculous Open Borders. This Tariff will remain in effect until such time as Drugs, in particular Fentanyl, and all Illegal Aliens stop this Invasion of our Country! Both Mexico and Canada have the absolute right and power to easily solve this long simmering problem. We hereby demand that they use this power, and until such time that they do, it is time for them to pay a very big price!". November 25, 2024 – via Truth Social.
- "It was a pleasure to have dinner the other night with Governor Justin Trudeau of the Great State of Canada. I look forward to seeing the Governor again soon so that we may continue our in depth talks on Tariffs and Trade, the results of which will be truly spectacular for all! DJT". December 9, 2024a – via Truth Social.
- "Truth Social".
- "Based on Ontario, Canada, placing a 25% Tariff on "Electricity" coming into the United States, I have instructed my Secretary of Commerce to add an ADDITIONAL 25% Tariff, to 50%, on all STEEL and ALUMINUM COMING INTO THE UNITED STATES FROM CANADA, ONE OF THE HIGHEST TARIFFING NATIONS ANYWHERE IN THE WORLD. This will go into effect TOMORROW MORNING, March 12th. Also, Canada must immediately drop their Anti-American Farmer Tariff of 250% to 390% on various U.S. dairy products, which has long been considered outrageous. I will shortly be declaring a National Emergency on Electricity within the threatened area" – via Truth Social.
- realDonaldTrump (March 28, 2025). "I just finished speaking with Prime Minister Mark Carney, of Canada. It was an extremely productive call, we agree on many things, and will be meeting immediately after Canada's upcoming Election to work on elements of Politics, Business, and all other factors, that will end up being great for both the United States of America and Canada. Thank you for your attention to this matter!" – via Truth Social.
- realDonaldTrump. "Conversely, and based on the fact that more than 75 Countries have called Representatives of the United States, including the Departments of Commerce, Treasury, and the USTR, to negotiate a solution to the subjects being discussed relative to Trade, Trade Barriers, Tariffs, Currency Manipulation, and Non Monetary Tariffs, and that these Countries have not, at my strong suggestion, retaliated in any way, shape, or form against the United States, I have authorized a 90 day PAUSE, and a substantially lowered Reciprocal Tariff during this period, of 10%, also effective immediately. Thank you for your attention to this matter!" – via Truth Social.
- realDonaldTrump (July 17, 2026). "We are holding Canada responsible for the fact that they are not properly maintaining their Forests, and Brush therein, and the United States is being unnecessarily invaded by filthy, polluted, and unhealthy air, the quality of which is dangerous, and totally unacceptable! I will call the Prime Minister during the day to find out what they are going to do about it. The cost is incalculable! Canada has refused to engage in basic Forest Management and Debris Removal, knowing that such refusal will lead to exactly this result. This is Willful Negligence, and becoming a yearly occurrence, costing the United States Billions of Dollars, which cost of this pollution must of necessity be added to the TARIFFS Canada is currently paying. Thank you for your attention to this matter! President DONALD J. TRUMP".

=== Congressional Research Service reports ===
- Casey, Christopher A; Elsea, Jennifer K (January 30, 2024). The International Emergency Economic Powers Act: Origins, Evolution, and Use (PDF) (Report). Congressional Research Services. p. 91.
- Casey, Christopher A. (February 3, 2025). The International Emergency Economic Powers Act (IEEPA), the National Emergencies Act (NEA), and Tariffs: Historical Background and Key Issues (Report).
- Kitamura, Kyla H. (February 21, 2024). U.S.-Canada Trade Relations (Report). Congressional Research Service. p. 3.
- Watson, Christopher D. (March 29, 2023). Import Monitoring Systems: Steel and Aluminum (Report). Congressional Research Service. p. 3.

=== Other ===
- "USMCA, Canada, & Mexico". Economic Research Service. n.d.
- "Agreement between the United States of America, the United Mexican States, and Canada 12/13/19 Text". Office of the United States Trade Representative. December 13, 2019. Archived from the original on June 8, 2020.
- "United States–Mexico–Canada Trade Fact Sheet – Modernizing NAFTA into a 21st Century Trade Agreement". United States Trade Representative.
