= Canada Innovation Corporation =

Canadian governmental organisation

Government of Canada Innovation Corporation is a planned arms-length Government of Canada organization whose mandate is a focused, outcome-driven investment approach to increase Canadian business expenditure on R&D across all sectors and regions of Canada and help to generate new and improved products and processes that will support the productivity and growth of Canadian firms. It was created through the Canada Innovation Corporation Act that received royal assent on June 22, 2023, it is currently a subsidiary of the Canada Development Investment Corporation as an interim measure, it plans to launch as a departmental corporation in 2026–2027.

== See also ==
- Innovacorp
- Innovate BC
- Canada Digital Adoption Program
- Canada Development Investment Corporation
