= Equals6 =

Canadian technology company

Equals6 Technology Group
- Company type: Private
- Industry: Internet; Social media Recruitment; Education
- Founded: Halifax, Canada (2011)
- Founder: Andy Osburn; Mark Boyle; Michael Sanderson
- Headquarters: Halifax, Nova Scotia, Canada
- Area served: North America
- Website: www.equals6.com

Equals6 Technology Group is a Canadian company based in Halifax, Nova Scotia and was founded in 2011 by Andy Osburn and Mark Boyle with technology entrepreneur Michael Sanderson.

Its product, Equals6.com, a student professional network, combines the features of Social media with the objective of helping students gain entry-level employment. Equals6, also referred to as E6, is a helps students connect to employers and access employment information and resources.

The company name is derived from the notion that with the right ingenuity two plus two can equal six.

== History ==
IN January, 2011, Equals6 launched in the Sobey Lounge at Saint Mary's University In February, 2011 E6 launched its Top-Talent Scholarship program. with a speech by Andy Osburn, CEO. By March, 2012, the company was providing services to 10,000 student users. In May, 2012 Equals6 secured a $250,000 venture capital investment from Innovacorp.

In 2013, Equals6 was selected for a Canadian government tech accelerator program.

In 2014, Equals6 conducted a survey about unpaid internships and publicized the results. At that time, the service had about 100,000 users.

In 2016, Equals6 was purchased by the executive search firm Venor.

== Services ==
=== For Students ===
The Equals6 site is free to students. Once registered, a student can build an on-line portfolio, connect with students, educators and organizations, find and apply for Equals6 and other scholarships, connect with job and talent recruiters, join groups based upon academic and career interests.

=== For Employers ===
Equals6.com was built for employers to identify and recruit students and recent graduates with appropriate skills, while allowing students to learn about companies and other employing organizations.

=== Scholarships ===
Beginning in 2011, Equals6 and several private industry partners have provided scholarships to high school and college/university student.s Top Talent Scholarships are awarded based on academic achievement, community citizenship, and Equals6 network participation. The scholarship award winners are chosen by the Equals6 Advisory Board and companies offering scholarships.

By March 2012 Equals6 had given out 50 scholarships worth almost $20,000.
