= Innovacorp =

Canadian corporation

- Type: Crown corporation
- Founded: 1995; 31 years ago
- Headquarters: Halifax, Nova Scotia, Canada
- Area served: Nova Scotia
- Key people: Malcolm Fraser, president and CEO
- Website: innovacorp.ca

Innovacorp is a Nova Scotia crown corporation managing an early-stage venture capital fund. The organization was established under Nova Scotia's Innovation Corporation Act, 1994–95, c. 5, s. 1. Its goal is to help early stage Nova Scotia companies commercialize their technologies for export markets. Key industries include information technology, life sciences, clean technology, advanced manufacturing and aerospace.

In May 2010, the organization's High Performance Incubation (HPi) earned an international award for its work from the National Business Incubation Association.

Innovacorp established a yearly technology start-up competition (I3) with a top prize of $100,000. Notable winners include Tether and Xona Games.

== History ==
Innovacorp, established by a provincial statute, superseded the Nova Scotia Research Foundation Corporation, which was established in 1946 as the Research Foundation of Nova Scotia.

== Investments ==
Innovacorp investments include companies such as SimplyCast, CarbonCure, GoInstant, SabrTech, Equals6, AioTV, LiveLenz, TruLeaf, DeNovaMed, Airline Employee Travel Inc (GoBumpFree), Proposify and TitanFile.

Beginning in 2015, Innovacorp invested around C$3 million in Meta Materials Inc., a Dartmouth-based developer of "high-performance functional materials and nanocomposites" that was founded in 2013. In 2021, shortly after Meta Materials was listed on the Nasdaq stock exchange, Innovacorp sold its shares, resulting in a $104-million return on investment.

== See also ==
- Canada Innovation Corporation
