= Backbone (card game) =

Backbone is a patience or card solitaire game played with two packs of playing cards. The object is to move all the cards to the foundations.

== Rules ==
In the centre are two reserve stacks to form the "Backbone". At the bottom of the "Backbone", there is a card that overlaps both reserve stacks. This card must be played before the remaining "Backbone" cards can be played. On each side of the "Backbone" are four tableau piles to form the "Ribs". The remainder of the pack (the stock) is present towards the bottom right.

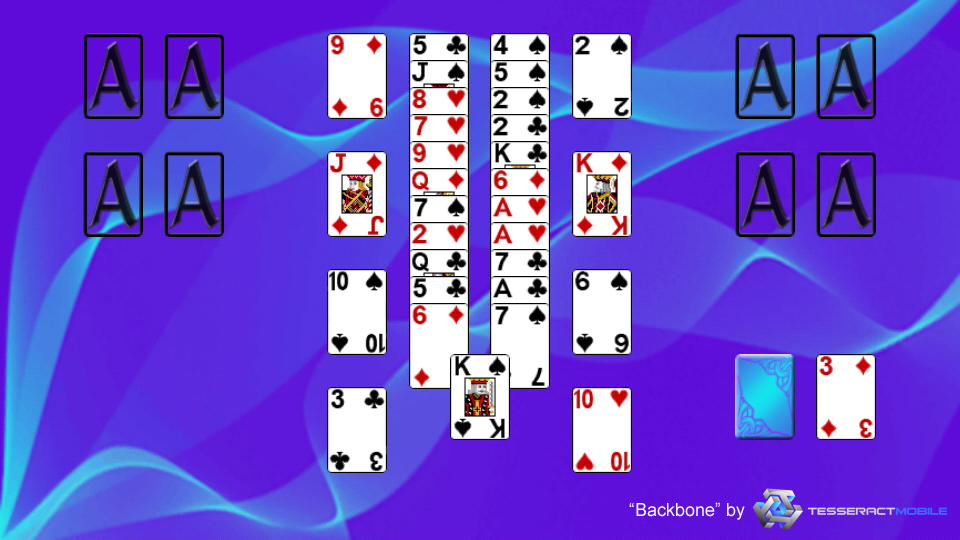
Backbone Layout

Backbone has eight foundations that build up from Ace to King in suit, e.g. A♣, 2♣, 3♣, 4♣... Cards in the "Backbone" can be moved to a foundation or tableau pile. The card at the base of the "Backbone" (the Coccyx or "tailbone" card) must be moved before the "Backbone" cards can be played. The tableau builds down in suit, e.g. 7♥, 6♥, 5♥...

An emptied stack can be filled with any card from the "Backbone" or pack. The stock is dealt one card at a time, and only two passes through the pack are allowed, making this a difficult game to win. The game is won after all the cards have been moved to the foundations.

== Variations ==
In the Aisleriot (Linux app) version of the game, cards from the Backbone cannot be played onto an empty stack. They must be played onto another card in either the Tableau or the Foundation. Thus, a King in the Backbone can only be played onto a Queen on a Foundation stack. This makes the game not only tougher, but also more challenging in the use of strategy.

== See also ==
- Herring-Bone
- List of patiences and card solitaires
- Glossary of patience and card solitaire terms

== Bibliography ==
- Dalton, Basil. The Complete Patience Book
- Parlett, David. The Penguin Book of Patience
- Pritchard, D.B. Patience Games
