= Canada Development Investment Corporation =

Canadian Crown corporation; founded 1982

- Native name: Corporation de développement des investissements du Canada
- Type: Crown corporation
- Industry: Investment management
- Founded: 1982; 44 years ago
- Headquarters: 302-1240 Bay Street, Toronto, Ontario, Canada
- Key people: Dwight Ball (chair)
- Owner: Government of Canada
- Website: cdev.gc.ca

The Canada Development Investment Corporation (CDEV; (Note: Until 2013, the corporation used the acronym CDIC) French: Corporation de développement des investissements du Canada) is a Canadian Crown corporation responsible for managing investments and corporate interests held by the Government of Canada, including making purchases and sales of assets on behalf of the King-in-Council.

== History ==
CDEV was incorporated under the Canada Business Corporations Act in 1982 and was initially intended to be a temporary entity, with legislation passed in 1998 directing the corporation's mandate to be focussed solely on orderly dissolution and divestment of its holdings. However, the Government of Canada announced in 2007 that CDEV would continue operations.

Owned in full by the Crown and managed by a Toronto-based board of directors, CDEV is accountable to the Parliament of Canada through the Minister of Finance. Any changes in corporate structure or purchases of new assets must be directed by the King-in-Council.

== Holdings ==
As of 2021, CDEV's current holdings consist of four subsidiary companies: Canada Hibernia Holding Corporation (manages the Government of Canada's 8.5% interest in the Hibernia oil field), Canada Eldor Inc. (manages remaining obligations of Eldorado Resources), Canada TMP Finance Limited (holding company for purchase and financing of Trans Mountain pipeline; 100% owner of Trans Mountain Corporation which manages the pipeline), and Canada Enterprise Emergency Funding Corporation (administers the Large Employer Emergency Financing Facility, a federal COVID-19 financial aid program for large Canadian businesses). In 2023, a new subsidiary, the Canada Innovation Corporation, was incorporated, which is to be implemented in 2026 or 2027.

In 2009, the corporation also, through its subsidiary 7176384 Canada Inc., purchased 7.9% of General Motors.

== See also ==
- Crown corporations of Canada
