= Backbone (magazine) =

Backbone (ISSN 1498-086X) is a Canadian business magazine and companion website that examine the role of technology and innovation within the context of Canadian business and economy. It keeps readers up to date on new ideas, trends and innovations in the technology world, and delivers information that related to the day-to-day operation of Canadian companies of all sizes.

In addition to its core focus on practical business insights, Backbone delivers stories on the role of digital media and technology on lifestyle and culture.

Backbone is published by Publimedia Communications Inc. The print magazine was distributed six times a year. It is based in North Vancouver, British Columbia. Its stated average readership was 306,000. The first print issue of the magazine was released in January 2001. For many years during the print magazine's run, it was the only magazine focused on Canadian business and technology.

On 13 March 2015 the magazine's publisher and founder, Steve Dietrich, announced the print publication would cease, but that the website would continue. The last print issue was published in March 2015. A decline in advertising revenue was stated by Dietrich as the prime reason.

Backbone's website continues to publish news, event listings, press releases, and blog posts.

== Pick 20 award ==
In 2008 and 2009, Backbone published an annual Pick 20 award for Canada's leading Web 2.0 pioneers. The criteria were: return on investment, competitive advantage, ongoing value, execution and innovation.

2008 winners:

1. Club Penguin, massively multiplayer online game
2. FreshBooks, online invoicing and time-tracking service
3. ConceptShare, online design collaboration space

2009 winners:

1. FreshBooks, online invoicing and time-tracking service
2. Myca Health, online communication platform linking patients and doctors
3. CoverItLive, real-time blogging software
