= Windmill (disambiguation) =

A windmill is an engine powered by the wind to produce energy.

Windmill may also refer to:

== Music ==
- Windmills (album), an album by Rick Roberts
- "Windmill", a song by Helloween from the 1993 album Chameleon
- "Windmills", a song by The Vamps from the 2015 album Wake Up
- "Windmill", a song by Feeder from the 2019 album Tallulah
- "Windmills", a song by Blackmore's Night from the 2006 album The Village Lanterne
- "The Windmill", a march chant sung by English members of the French Foreign Legion
- Windmill, a guitar move credited to Pete Townshend of The Who

== Films and television ==
- The Windmill (1937 film), a British film
- The Windmill (2016 film), a Dutch horror film
- Windmill (TV series), a 1980s BBC television series
- "Windmills", an episode of The Expanse

== Sports and games ==
- Windmill (chess), a combination of moves where a series of discovered checks result in winning of material
- Windmill (juggling), a juggling pattern
- Windmill (solitaire), a solitaire card game played with two decks of cards
- Windmill (sailing dinghy), class of racing sailboat

== Places ==
- Windmill, County Westmeath, Ireland
- Windmill, a townland on the outskirts of Cashel, Ireland; see List of townlands of County Tipperary
- Windmill, Derbyshire, England, United Kingdom
- Windmill, New Mexico, United States
- Windmill, a village near Pentre Halkyn, Wales, United Kingdom
- Windmill Islands, an Antarctic group of rocky islands and rocks
- The Windmill, Brixton, a pub in London known for its live music
- The Windmill (restaurant), a hotdog restaurant in New Jersey, US
- The Farmer's Dog, a pub restaurant in Oxfordshire formerly known as The Windmill
- Si Lom Road, known as Windmill Road prior to the 1930's

== Other uses ==
- Windmill (b-boy move), a breakdancing move
- Windmill Books, an American publisher, later an imprint of Simon & Schuster
- Windmill (card game)
- Windmill (G.I. Joe), a fictional character in the G.I. Joe universe
- "Windmill" (short story), a short story from the 1987 anthology The Dark Between the Stars
- Windmill restart, a maneuver that uses kinetic energy to restart a jet engine
- Windmill Software, Canadian software company
- Operation Windmill, a U.S. Navy exploration and training mission to Antarctica in 1947–48
- Original Heidelberg Platen Press, a letterpress printing press often referred to as the "Windmill"
- Windmill cookies, an alternate name for Speculaas-type cookies
- Windmills (plant), plants in the genus Allionia

== See also ==
- Windmill Hill (disambiguation)
- Windmill Point (disambiguation)
- List of windmills
- Water Mill (disambiguation)
- Wind (disambiguation)
- Mill (disambiguation)
