= Windmill Point (disambiguation) =

Windmill Point is the former name of Goose Village, Montreal.

Windmill Point may also refer to:

- Windmill Point, the former name of Pemberton Point, Hull.
- Windmill Point Light, the name of several lighthouses:
  - Windmill Point Light (Michigan), in Detroit, Michigan
  - Windmill Point Light (Vermont), in Lake Champlain
  - Windmill Point Light (Virginia), in the Chesapeake Bay
  - Windmill Point Light (Ontario), in Prescott, Ontario, Canada
