= Windmill Point Light =

Windmill Point Light may refer to:

- Windmill Point Light (Michigan), in Detroit, Michigan
- Windmill Point Light (Vermont), in Lake Champlain
- Windmill Point Light (Virginia), in the Chesapeake Bay
- Windmill Point Light (Ontario), in Prescott, Ontario, Canada
