= List of shipwrecks in May 1883 =

The list of shipwrecks in May 1883 includes ships sunk, foundered, grounded, or otherwise lost during May 1883.

== 1 May ==
List of shipwrecks: 1 May 1883
| Ship | State | Description |
|---|---|---|
| Attillio | Spain | The brig was wrecked at Palma, Mallorca. |

== 3 May ==
List of shipwrecks: 3 May 1883
| Ship | State | Description |
|---|---|---|
| Coldra | United Kingdom | The steamship collided with the steamship Redbrook (United Kingdom) at Bilbao, Spain and was beached. |

== 4 May ==
List of shipwrecks: 4 May 1883
| Ship | State | Description |
|---|---|---|
| Zufreidenheit | Germany | The steamship collided with the steamship Ernte (Germany) and sank in the Vistula. All on board survived. |

== 5 May ==
List of shipwrecks: 5 May 1883
| Ship | State | Description |
|---|---|---|
| Kilmeney | Flag unknown | The ship departed from Wellington, New Zealand for Newcastle, New South Wales. No further trace, reported overdue. |
| Little Kate | United Kingdom | The schooner was run down and sunk at Sheerness, Kent by the steamship Prinses Marie (Netherlands) with the loss of one of the four people on board. |
| Zambesi | United Kingdom | The ship foundered in ice off the coast of Nova Scotia, Canada. Her crew survived. She was on a voyage from Sunderland, County Durham to Quebec City, Canada. |

== 7 May ==
List of shipwrecks: 7 May 1883
| Ship | State | Description |
|---|---|---|
| Tryall | United Kingdom | The ship departed from Middlesbrough, Yorkshire for Great Yarmouth, Norfolk. No further trace, reported missing. |

== 9 May ==
List of shipwrecks: 9 May 1883
| Ship | State | Description |
|---|---|---|
| Fidra | United Kingdom | The steamship departed from Newcastle, New South Wales for Hong Kong. No further trace, presumed foundered with the loss of all hands. |
| Patria | Norway | The barque ran aground, capsized and broke her back at Hartlepool, County Durham, United Kingdom. She was on a voyage from Steinkjer to Hartlepool. She was declared a total loss. |
| Strathendrick | United Kingdom | The steamship ran aground on the Crow Rock, off the coast of Pembrokeshire and was wrecked. She was on a voyage from the River Duddon to Newport, Monmouthshire. |

== 10 May ==
List of shipwrecks: 10 May 1883
| Ship | State | Description |
|---|---|---|
| Astrakhan | Russia | The steamship ran aground in the Bosphorus at Riva, Ottoman Empire. |
| Aurania | United Kingdom | The steamship ran aground in the Clyde. She was refloated the next day. |
| Countess | United Kingdom | The fishing trawler was abandoned in the Irish Sea 35 nautical miles (65 km) south south west of the Hook Lighthouse, County Wexford. Her crew were rescued by the fishing trawler Esmerelda (United Kingdom). Countess was towed in to Milford Haven, Pembrokeshire by the tug Fiery Cross (United Kingdom) on 15 May. |
| Eliza Ann | United Kingdom | The schooner sprang a leak and was beached near Kildonan, Isle of Arran. She was on a voyage from Larne, County Antrim to Ayr. |
| Horsa | Denmark | The steamship was driven ashore at "Bolsaxen". She was on a voyage from Nyborg to Aarhus. |
| Kolstrup | Germany | The ship was wrecked on "Dyer's Island", Cape Colony. She was on a voyage from Antwerp, B Belgium to Shanghai, China. |
| Mercury | United Kingdom | The steamship was driven ashore and wrecked at Blackpool, Lancashire. Her six crew were rescued. |
| Nachimoff | Russia | The steamship ran aground in the Bosphorus at Kilia, Ottoman Empire. |
| Raynaud | (Haiti) Haitian Navy | The man-of-war collided with the steamship Don (United Kingdom) and sank at Port-au-Prince. |
| Rosebank | United Kingdom | The schooner ran aground at Wick, Caithness and was damaged. She was refloated. |
| Victoria | United Kingdom | The ship capsized and sank in the Bristol Channel off Lavernock Point, Glamorgan. Her three crew survived. She was on a voyage from Bristol, Gloucestershire to Cardiff, Glamorgan. |

== 11 May ==
List of shipwrecks: 11 May 1883
| Ship | State | Description |
|---|---|---|
| Hugin | Norway | The barque was driven ashore in the Nieuwe Diep. She was on a voyage from Galveston, Texas, United States to Hamburg, Germany. |

== 12 May ==
List of shipwrecks: 12 May 1883
| Ship | State | Description |
|---|---|---|
| Inchgarvie | United Kingdom | The steamship collided with the steamship Athens (United Kingdom) at Antwerp, Belgium and was beached. Inchgarvie was on a voyage from Akyab, Burma to Antwerp. |
| Mark | United Kingdom | The ship departed from Maryport, Cumberland for Belfast, County Antrim. No further trace, reported missing. |
| Nova Rosa | United Kingdom | The schooner was driven ashore and wrecked on "Reune Head", Devon. |

== 13 May ==
List of shipwrecks: 13 May 1883
| Ship | State | Description |
|---|---|---|
| Mississippi | United States | The steamship, was destroyed by fire at Seattle, Washington. Her wreck was abandoned. |
| Mourino | United Kingdom | The steamship collided with Brookfield at Gibraltar and was beached. |

== 14 May ==
List of shipwrecks: 14 May 1883
| Ship | State | Description |
|---|---|---|
| Annie | United Kingdom | The steamship was driven ashore on Öland, Sweden. She was refloated and towed in to Kalmar, Sweden. |
| Bessie | United Kingdom | The ship was driven ashore near Port Talbot, Glamorgan. |
| Hans Holmboe | Norway | The brig was driven ashore at Lemvig, Denmark. She was on a voyage from Liverpool, Lancashire, United Kingdom to Christiania. |
| Kalmia | United Kingdom | The ship ran aground on the James and Marys, in the Hooghly River. |
| Nordstjernen | Sweden | The brig was driven ashore on Öland. She was on a voyage from Oscarshamn to Antwerp, Belgium. |

== 16 May ==
List of shipwrecks: 16 May 1883
| Ship | State | Description |
|---|---|---|
| Job T. Wilson | United States | The steamship sank in a gale off Windmill Point, Virginia with the loss of a crew member. |

== 17 May ==
List of shipwrecks: 17 May 1883
| Ship | State | Description |
|---|---|---|
| Chinsura | India | The steamship was driven ashore near False Point. She was declared a total loss. |
| Sappho | United Kingdom | The steamship ran aground in the Scheldt opposite Bath, Zeeland, Netherlands. She was on a voyage from Antwerp, Belgium to Bristol, Gloucestershire. She subsequently brok in tow; the stern section sank. |

== 18 May ==
List of shipwrecks: 18 May 1883
| Ship | State | Description |
|---|---|---|
| Catania | United Kingdom | The steamship struck an uncharted rock and was abandoned in the Hanish Islands. Her crew were rescued by Stolzenfels (Germany). Catania was on a voyage from Kurrachee, India to Marseille, Bouches-du-Rhône, France. |

== 19 May ==
List of shipwrecks: 19 May 1883
| Ship | State | Description |
|---|---|---|
| Sierra Palma | United Kingdom | The ship struck a sunken rock and foundered 30 nautical miles (56 km) east of East London, Cape Colony with the loss of one of the 30 people on board. She was on a voyage from Rangoon, Burma to Liverpool, Lancashire. |

== 21 May ==
List of shipwrecks: 21 May 1883
| Ship | State | Description |
|---|---|---|
| Amity | United Kingdom | The steamship collided with the steamship India and sank. Her crew were rescued by India. Amity was on a voyage from Taganrog, Russia to London. |

== 23 May ==
List of shipwrecks: 23 May 1883
| Ship | State | Description |
|---|---|---|
| Bay of Cadiz | United Kingdom | The ship was driven ashore on Scarp Island, Outer Hebrides. She was on a voyage from Calcutta, India to Dundee, Forfarshire. She was refloated on 1 June. |

== 24 May ==
List of shipwrecks: 24 May 1883
| Ship | State | Description |
|---|---|---|
| Isle of Arran | United Kingdom | The steamship was driven ashore on the coast of Sweden. She was on a voyage from Charlestown to "Frederica". |

== 25 May ==
List of shipwrecks: 25 May 1883
| Ship | State | Description |
|---|---|---|
| Amon | United States | The steamship was wrecked on a railway bridge pier at Pittsburgh, Pennsylvania with the loss of a crew member. |
| Falke | Germany | The barque sank at "Ichabor" with the loss of all on board. |
| Iduna, and Zadok | United Kingdom | The steamship Iduna was run into by the barque Zadok and sank 14 nautical miles (26 km) off St. Catherine's Point, Isle of Wight. Her crew survived. She was on a voyage from Newcastle upon Tyne, Northumberland to Málaga, Spain. Zadok was severely damaged; she put in to Portsmouth, Hampshire waterlogged at the bow. |

== 30 May ==
List of shipwrecks: 30 May 1883
| Ship | State | Description |
|---|---|---|
| Fedalma | Germany | The ship departed from Rockhampton, Maine, United States for Hamburg. No further trace, reported missing. |

== 31 May ==
List of shipwrecks: 31 May 1883
| Ship | State | Description |
|---|---|---|
| Alexander II | Russia | The ship was driven ashore at "Kibbasar", Saaremaa. She was refloated and resumed her voyage. |
| Leslie | United Kingdom | The schooner was driven ashore at Dunfanaghy, County Donegal. She was refloated the next day. |

== Unknown date ==
List of shipwrecks: Unknown date in May 1883
| Ship | State | Description |
|---|---|---|
| Bellmore | United Kingdom | The steamship ran aground at Bermuda. She was refloated. |
| Bina Campbell | United Kingdom | The ship foundered in the Indian Ocean. Her crew were rescued. She was on a voyage from Bimlipatam, India to London. |
| Eureka | United States | The steamship was wrecked in the Peril Strait. All on board survived. |
| Fides | United Kingdom | The brig foundered at sea on or before 12 May. Her crew were rescued. She was on a voyage from Cádiz, Spain to Vlaardingen, South Holland, Netherlands. |
| Gulnare | Canada Canada | The ship was driven ashore in Little Egg Harbor. She was on a voyage from New York, United States to Port Antonio, Jamaica. |
| Hilda | United Kingdom | The schooner was driven ashore on Bonaire, Netherlands Antilles. Her crew survived. |
| Inga | Norway | The barque was abandoned in the Atlantic Ocean. Her crew were rescued. She was on a voyage from Greenock, Renfrewshire, United Kingdom to Quebec City, Canada. |
| Iris | United Kingdom | The steamship ran aground at Cardiff, Glamorgan. She was on a voyage from Cardiff to Constantinople, Ottoman Empire. |
| John R. Worcester | United States | The ship was driven ashore at Alleppey, India. She was on a voyage from Colombo, Ceylon to Alleppey. |
| Ludwig | Belgium | The steamship was severely damaged by fire at Montreal, Quebec, Canada. She was on a voyage from Antwerp to Montreal. |
| Margarethe | Flag unknown | The ship was driven ashore near Pärnu, Russia. |
| Niels Koren | Norway | The schooner ran aground at Copenhagen, Denmark. She was on a voyage from St. David's, Pembrokeshire, United Kingdom to Westervik, Sweden. |
| Vrijheid | Netherlands | The brig foundered in the Indian Ocean before 15 May. Her crew were rescued. She was on a voyage from the Moluccas, Netherlands East Indies to Amsterdam, North Holland. |
