= Waterwheel (disambiguation) =

A water wheel is a machine for converting falling or flowing water into useful power.

Water wheel or Waterwheel may also refer to:

- Paddle steamer, or paddle wheel ship, a ship driven by a paddle wheel or wheels in the water
- Center-pivot irrigation, a method of crop irrigation in which equipment rotates around a pivot and crops are watered with sprinklers
- Noria, a machine for lifting water into an aqueduct
- Saqiyah, a mechanical animal-powered water lifting device
- Watermill, a factory or industrial process driven by water power
- Waterwheel plant, common name for the plant Aldrovanda vesiculosa
- "Waterwheel", a composition by Ralph Towner from his 1978 album Batik
- The WaterWheel Foundation, a charitable organization for the band Phish

== See also ==
- Water Mill (disambiguation)
- Wheel (disambiguation)
- Water (disambiguation)
