= Gallus Holding =

Swiss label printing and folding press manufacturer

Gallus Holding AG
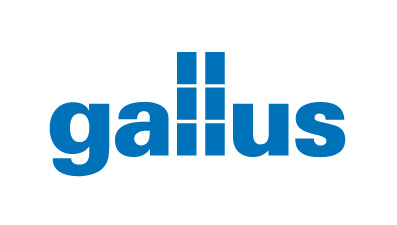
- Company type: Limited company (Aktiengesellschaft)
- Industry: Engineering, manufacturing
- Founded: 1923
- Headquarters: St. Gallen, Switzerland
- Key people: Klaus Bachstein (CEO); Peter J. Hauser (Chairman)
- Revenue: 201 million CHF (2011)
- Number of employees: 590 (2011)
- Website: www.gallus-group.com

Gallus Holding AG, based in St. Gallen, Switzerland, is an international manufacturer of label printing and folding carton presses. Since 2014, Gallus is a complete subsidiary of Heidelberger Druckmaschinen AG.

== History ==
The sole proprietorship Ferdinand Rüesch, Gauger (scales factory and machine workshop) was founded in 1923 by Ferdinand Rüesch-Baur. The first label printing press was produced in 1925. The company moved into the export business in the mid-1950s, before launching a world first in 1960 with the introduction of the segment die-cutting unit.

Having built up a workforce of some 220 employees by 1974, the company was transformed into a joint stock company and now operated under the name Gallus Ferd. Rüesch AG.

The foundation of a first subsidiary in the United States in 1981 represented the company's first direct foray into international territory. This strategy was continued in the 1990s in particular through the acquisition of a holding in Arsoma Druckmaschinen GmbH in Langgöns, Germany, and the foundation of additional subsidiaries in Great Britain, Germany, Australia and Denmark between 1992 and 1996. In 1999, Heidelberger Druckmaschinen AG acquired a 30 percent share in the Gallus Group. A total acquisition was completed in 2014 after the Heidelberg management board agreed to do so.

In 2006, the Gallus Group acquired BHS Druck- und Veredelungstechnik GmbH in Weiden, Germany. The company's name was changed to Gallus Stanz- und Druckmaschinen GmbH in 2008, and it now makes up a second area of operation in the Gallus Group in the form of the Folding Carton division. In July 2020, Heidelberg announced the sale of Gallus to the Swiss Benpac Holding AG. The sale was canceled in January 2021.
