= Water Mill =

Water Mill or Watermill may refer to:

- Watermill, a mill that uses hydropower
  - Milldam, which may include a water mill within the dam
  - Water wheel, the driving engine of the mill
- List of watermills, listing several water mills called Watermill
- The Watermill (Ruisdael), a 1660 painting by Jacob van Ruisdael
- The Watermill (1958 tune) musical composition by Ronald Binge
- Watermill (ballet), a 1972 ballet by Jerome Robbins
- Watermill Theatre, a repertory theatre in Bagnor, Newbury, Berkshire, England, UK
- Water Mill, New York, USA; a hamlet on Long Island in Suffolk County
  - Water Mill (LIRR station) of the Long Island Rail Road, in the hamlet of Water Mill
  - Water Mill (Water Mill, New York), a watermill listed on the National Register of Historic Places
  - The Watermill Center, a center for arts and the humanities
- Watermill Cove, St. Mary's, Isles of Scilly, Cornwall, England

== See also ==
- Waterwheel (disambiguation)
- Windmill (disambiguation)
- Mill (disambiguation)
