= Heidelberger Druckmaschinen =

German printing press manufacturer

Heidelberger Druckmaschinen AG
- Type: Aktiengesellschaft
- Traded as: OTCID Basic: HBGRY
- ISIN: DE0007314007
- Industry: Engineering, manufacturing
- Founded: 1850; 176 years ago
- Headquarters: Heidelberg, Germany
- Key people: Jürgen Otto (managing director and chairman of the executive board); Martin Sonnenschein (chairman of the supervisory board)
- Products: Printing presses, platesetters, printing software
- Revenue: €2.395 billion (business year from April 2023 until March 2024)
- Number of employees: 9,591 (in March 2024)
- Website: www.heidelberg.com

Heidelberger Druckmaschinen AG (German pronunciation: [ˈhaɪdl̩ˌbɛʁɡɐ ˈdʁʊkmaˌʃiːnən ʔaːˈɡeː]), sometimes referred to as Heidelberg or Heideldruck for short, is a German precision mechanical engineering company with registered offices in Heidelberg (Baden-Württemberg) and headquarters in nearby Wiesloch-Walldorf (Baden-Württemberg). The company offers products and services along the entire process and value chain for printing products and is the largest global manufacturer of offset printing presses. Heidelberg further produces equipment for prepress, press and postpress.

== History ==
=== Early years (1845–1896) ===
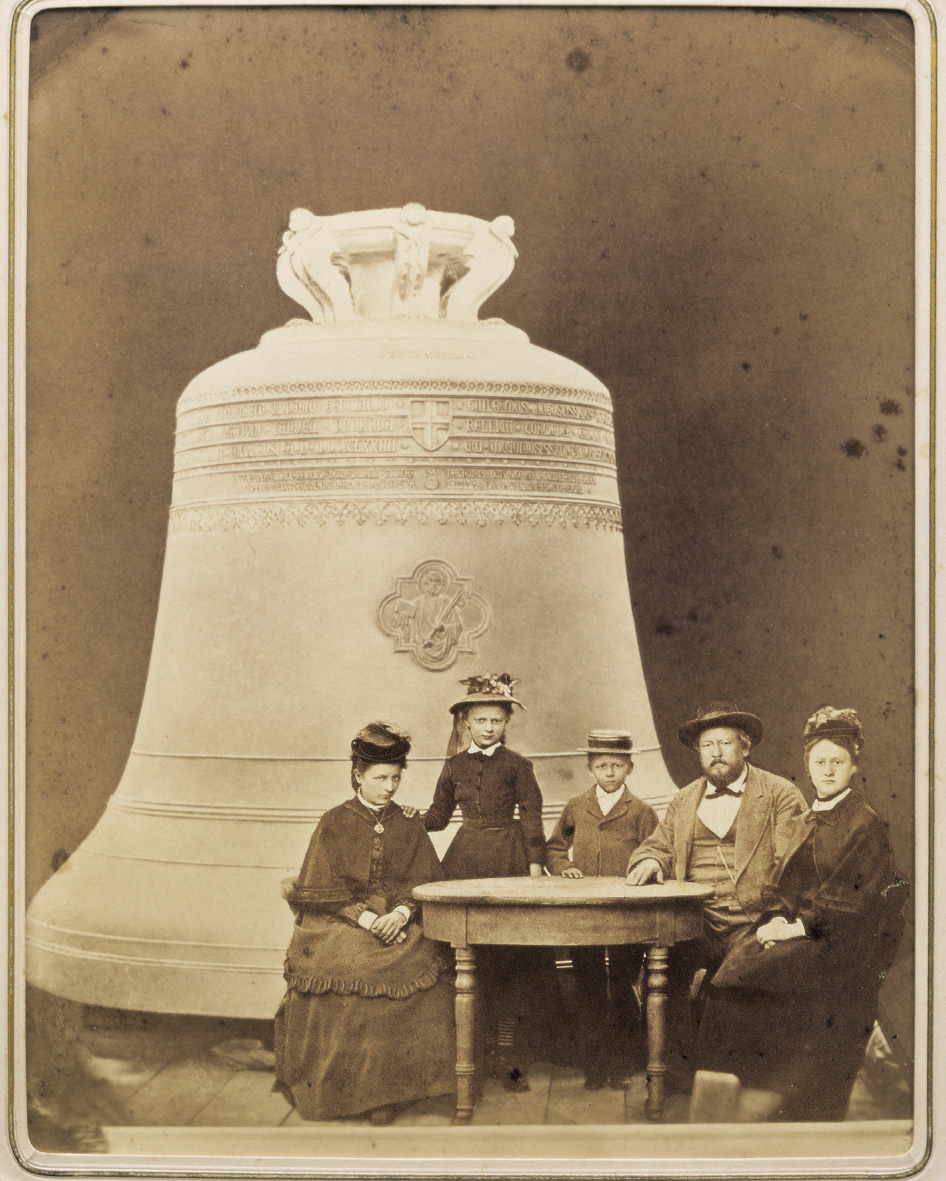
Andreas Hamm and family with the Kaiserglocke, 1875

Company history and people involved

Heidelberger Druckmaschinen AG goes back to a bell foundry founded in Frankenthal in 1774. In 1845, the bell caster Georg Hamm took over the foundry before his brother Andreas Hamm joined as a partner in 1849. The official founding date of the AG is 1850, when Andreas Hamm took over the shares of his brother, who had to flee into exile after the Revolutions of 1848. In 1851, Hamm left the company and took the bell foundry business with him.

In 1856, Hamm met Andreas Albert, a mechanical engineering manager, with whom he decided to produce high-speed presses in loose cooperation. In 1863, they officially founded the company Albert & Hamm, which Hamm supplied with machines and raw materials, while Albert took over the day-to-day running and design of the presses. Operating costs and profits were shared. The machines were sometimes criticized for resembling Reichenbach's models without offering significant improvements.

After Andreas Albert's departure in 1873, Hamm devoted himself increasingly to bell casting, including the Kaiserglocke for Cologne Cathedral. Later, he and his son Karl again produced rapid presses, in competition with Albert's new company, the Albert & Cie rapid press factory. After Hamm's death in 1894, his son sold the company to Wilhelm Müller in 1895, who moved the company headquarters to Heidelberg. The sale included the mechanical engineering division, but not the bell foundry. Müller was already a partner in Maschinenfabrik Heidelberg Molitor & Cie.

In 1896, Maschinenfabrik Heidelberg Molitor was liquidated and A. Hamm OHG, Schnellpressenfabrik und Eisengießerei was entered in the Heidelberg commercial register. The partners of this company, which took over the Maschinenfabrik Molitor's building, were Wilhelm Müller and Karl Geiger. Around 300 people were employed at the two production sites in Frankenthal and Heidelberg-Bergheim in 1896.

=== Takeover by the banks and Richard Kahn (1896–1931) ===
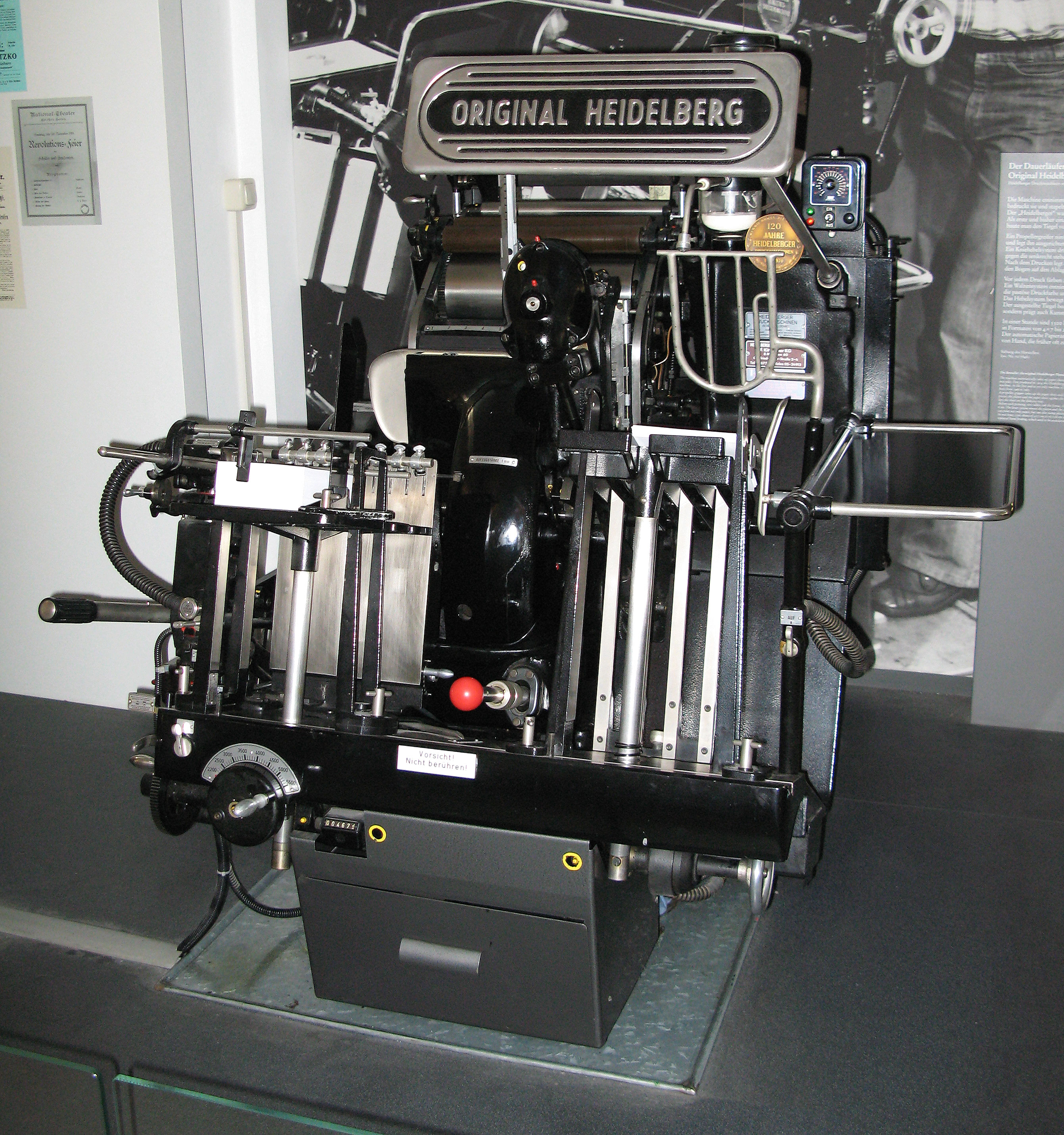
The Original Heidelberg Platen Press, probably the company's most famous product from Kahn's time

Rising raw material prices and declining demand led to a crisis for the company at the turn of the century, as a result of which the factory, then called Schnellpressenfabrik A. Hamm AG, became the property of Rheinische Creditbank in Mannheim and Darmstädter Bank für Handel und Industrie. In 1905, the company name was changed to Schnellpressenfabrik Aktiengesellschaft Heidelberg (short form: Schnellpresse). As the crisis of the Schnellpresse continued, the banks were soon looking for a new investor for the company, for which they also acted as creditors. In 1916, the Bochum-born entrepreneur Richard Kahn incorporated Schnellpresse into his own corporate network, the Richard Kahn Group.

A well-known product in Kahn's era was the Original Heidelberg Platen Press, which was produced 165,000 times between 1914 and 1985. It was the first press to have an automatic paper feed and therefore worked much faster than conventional models. The Original Heidelberg Platen Press had already been developed before Kahn took over, and under his leadership it was further developed and made ready for series production. It is the best-known and most widespread form of this type of machine in the world.

During the Great Depression, the Kahn Group was struggling with increasingly severe financial problems and was heavily in debt. This led to the complete collapse of the Kahn Group in 1932. Fortunately for Schnellpresse, the profitable parts of the Kahn Group, including Schnellpressenfabrik with its subsidiaries Maschinenfabrik Geislingen (MAG) and C. Maquet AG, had already been spun off in 1931 at the insistence of the banks. This ensured the continued existence of the company, even though Deutsche Bank und Disconto-Gesellschaft and Commerz- und Privatbank became the new main shareholders. In March 1940, Rheinelektra took over the absolute majority of Schnellpressenfabrik shares from Deutsche Bank.

=== Third Reich and World War II (1931–1945) ===
After the collapse of Kahn's holding company, Schnellpresse continued to grow. The company suffered a serious setback for its domestic business in 1935, during Nazi Germany, when Max Amann, the president of the Reichspressekammer, issued several decrees that allowed the liquidation of publishing houses that did not conform to the system and prohibited the establishment of new printing plants. At the same time, the increased performance of the printing plants due to the more efficient machine base had a negative impact on the new press business for the first time. All of this led to a 27.6% drop in domestic sales in 1935. However, this decline in sales was compensated for by an increase in foreign sales of almost a third. Despite severe disadvantages due to the restriction of press freedom, the factory was not unpopular with Nazi functionaries due to the foreign currency it generated.

From 1939, the company shifted to manufacturing lathes, crucial for the war effort. It secured major orders from Magdeburger Werkzeugmaschinenfabrik and Gebrüder Heinemann, producing 1,000 precision and turret lathes worth Reichsmark 4.7 million. During that time, Schnellpresse became the first German company to manufacture machine tools on an assembly line. The Geislingen plant mainly manufactured shells and bullet casings, while hydraulic units for aircraft were also produced in Heidelberg itself. Although the armaments command in Mannheim demanded the discontinuation of printing press construction as early as 1940 and the procurement of materials important to the war effort, such as steel, became increasingly difficult, production continued until 1942. To compensate for male workers called up for military service, a maximum of around 150 French and Soviet prisoners of war and Ostarbeiter were deployed during the war. At this time, they made up 23% of the total workforce. The halls of the Schnellpresse factory survived the end of the war unscathed.

=== Growth and further internationalization (1945–2000) ===
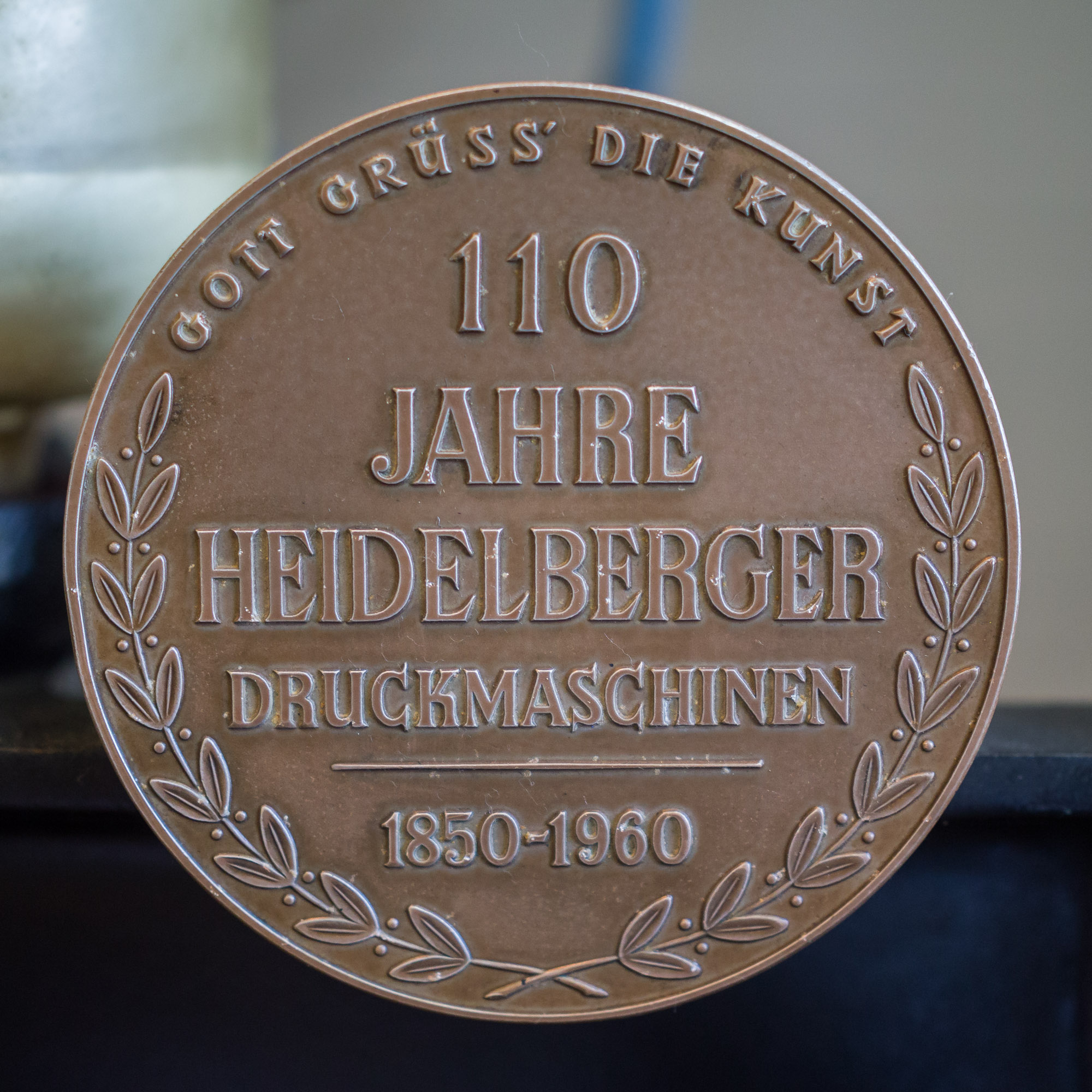
Plaque on the occasion of the 110th anniversary of the company in 1960

After the end of World War II, Hubert Sternberg became the company's new manager. He had already joined the board in 1926 and remained there until 1972. The current main plant in Wiesloch-Walldorf was opened in 1957 after a year of construction, as the main plant in Heidelberg had become too small and the resistance to the company's new building project in Heidelberg had become too strong. At the beginning of the 1960s, only machines for relief printing were produced by Schnellpresse, but in 1962, the company introduced its first machine for offset printing, the Heidelberg KOR (Kleine Offset Rotation). In 1967, Schnellpresse was renamed Heidelberger Druckmaschinen AG. In 1972, GTO (Großer Tiegel Offset) was the first offset press to deliver more than 40,000 printing units. The introduction of the Speedmaster series in 1974 consolidated Heidelberg's position in the construction of offset presses. Although Heidelberg entered the offset press market relatively late, the company became the world market leader in this field within a few years.

The company continued to grow in the 1980s and at times had around a third of all European machine tool bases with numerical control in operation. In 1988, Heidelberg acquired the web offset press manufacturer Harris Graphics Corporation with locations in France, the United States and Mexico. In 1996, Heidelberg acquired the companies Linotype-Hell AG (laser imagesetters specifically for plate imaging), Stork Contiweb (web offset presses and ancillaries) and Sheridan Systems (newspaper mailroom and commercial bindery systems).

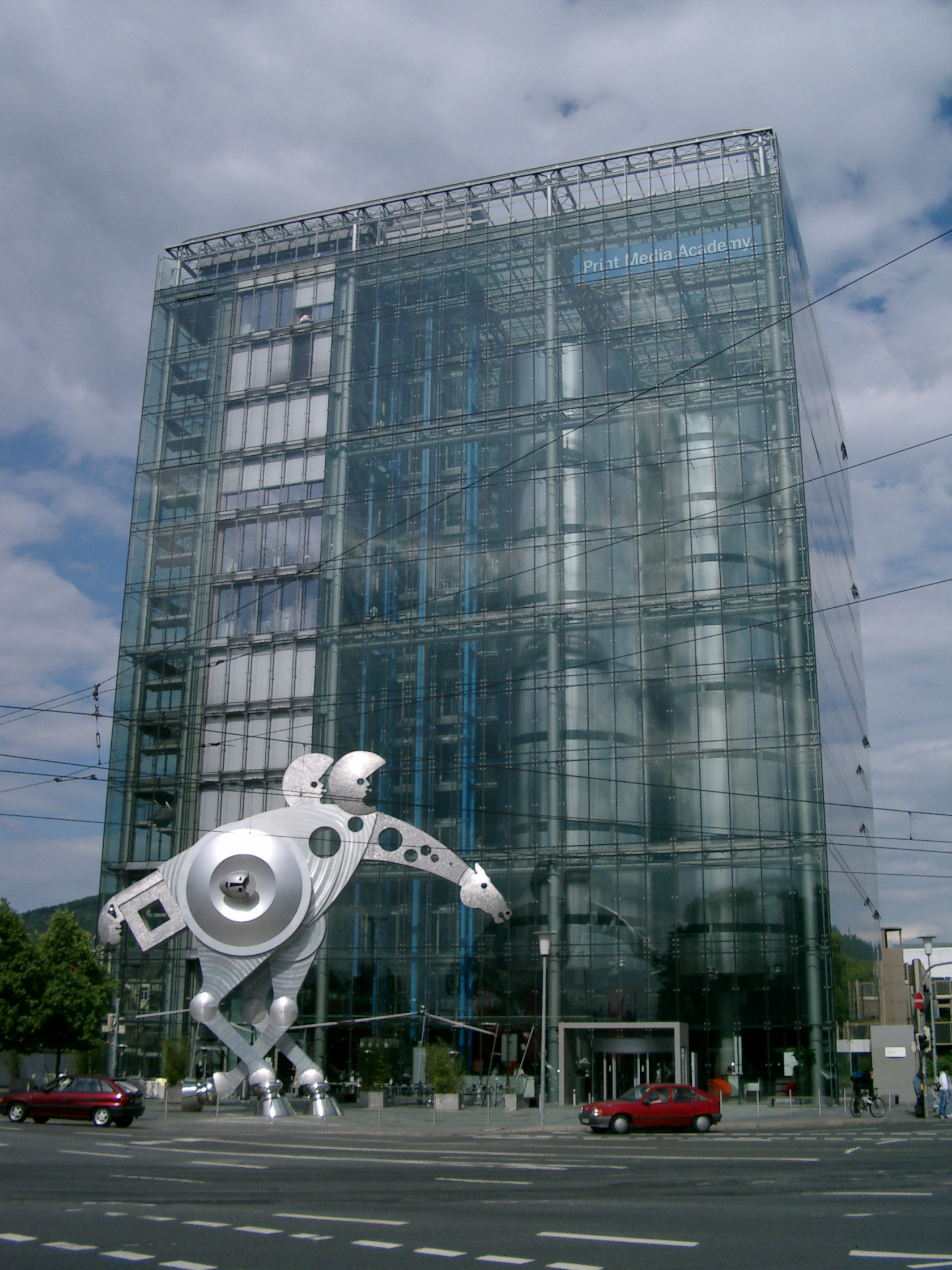
Print Media Academy, the former office and training building of the company in Heidelberg

In Hartmut Mehdorn's era as managing director, Heidelberger Druckmaschinen AG went public for the first time in 1997 on the Frankfurt Stock Exchange (under the abbreviation HDD). In 1999, Heidelberger Druckmaschinen took over the office imaging division (black-and-white digital printing) from Eastman Kodak Company as well as the company Stahl from Ludwigsburg, a company that primarily manufactured folding machines and other machines for print finishing. In 2000, the Print Media Academy was opened, a high-rise building that was erected as a training and office building in Heidelberg on behalf of Heidelberger Druckmaschinen.

=== First phase of weakness and contraction (2000–2008) ===
Following the September 11 attacks and the associated sharp downturn in the advertising industry, which was particularly relevant for Heidelberger, the financial year 2002/2003 was the first in decades in which Heidelberger Druckmaschinen AG made a loss. Following this, the company reorganized its business activities. In 2003, Heidelberger Druckmaschinen took over Jagenberg AG's die-cutting and folder-gluer division, the subsidiaries Jagenberg Diana GmbH in Neuss and Woschnik + Partner in Mönchengladbach as well as a plant in Slovakia, Jagenberg Slovensko spol. s.r.o. in Nove Mesto. These companies produced machines required for folding and gluing cardboard and corrugated cardboard packaging.

After the company's strong growth could no longer be sustained, the Web Systems division (web offset presses) with plants in Dover (U.S.), Montataire (France) and Boxmeer (Netherlands), among others, had to be sold to the US company Goss International. In return, Heidelberg received a 15% stake in Goss. The digital printing division and the existing joint venture with Kodak for digital color printing, NexPress, were transferred back to the American partner, and Heidelberg Digital Finishing GmbH in Mühlhausen im Täle, a former Kodak site, was closed. With these decisions, the expansion into new business areas was revised.

The company returned to profitability in the 2004/05 financial year. At the same time, in May 2004, RWE announced that it would liquidate its holdings in Heideldruck. This took place during the general reduction of industrial holdings by the energy group. RWE had held a majority stake of over 56% in Heidelberger Druckmaschinen AG for a long time, indirectly from 1940 to 1997 via Rheinelektra and from 1997 to 2000 via Lahmeyer AG. After the merger of Lahmeyer AG with RWE in 2000, the Heideldruck shareholding was held directly by the parent company.

=== Effects of the 2008 financial crisis ===
The 2008 financial crisis led to a considerable decline in incoming orders and sales at Heidelberg in 2008, while overcapacities on the global market caused difficulties for pricing. Under the pressure of the crisis, cost-cutting measures were introduced. In this context, the company also laid off around 4,000 of its previous 20,000 employees worldwide. Short-time working was introduced at all German sites in 2009 and 2010 and loans and federal guarantees amounting to over €700 million had to be applied for in order to stabilize the company's finances. At the Annual General Meeting in July 2010, the shareholders also approved a capital increase worth around €420 million by a large majority. This reduced the company's debt and improved its capital structure. Goss International had already been fully acquired by Shanghai Electric in the previous month of June, with Heidelberg's 15% stake in Goss also changing hands.

=== Entry into new business areas (2011–2019) ===
Since April 2011, there has been a global strategic partnership with the Japanese electronics manufacturer Ricoh to tap into the growing market for digital printing machines. In 2012, 2,000 jobs worldwide were cut, including over 1,200 in Germany. At the beginning of November 2013, Heidelberg announced a global strategic partnership with Fujifilm, which was primarily concerned with the development of products for the growing digital printing market. With the acquisition of the Swiss Gallus Holding in 2014, Heidelberg entered the label printing market.

In 2015, the executive board and large parts of the administration moved from the city of Heidelberg to the nearby town of Wiesloch. The same year, the division acquired from Jagenberg for the production of die-cutting and folding box gluing machines was sold to Masterwork Machinery Co. Ltd. (MK) from Tianjin. In the 2015/16 financial year, Heidelberger Druckmaschinen achieved a profit after taxes for the first time after several years of losses. In March 2019, the Chinese Masterwork Group, the previous sales partner in the field of machines for the further processing of packaging prints, acquired an 8.5% stake in Heidelberger Druckmaschinen AG.

Particularly in the wake of a difficult market environment in the graphic industry, Heidelberger Druckmaschinen AG began to offer its own products in other business areas. Since 2018, this has included the production of wall charging stations for electric vehicles, so-called wallboxes, the electronics of which are also developed by Heidelberger Druckmaschinen. The wall charging stations are sold under the brand Amperfield. Within the printing business, the company adopted a subscription model for printers at a per-sheet price, lending out equipment rather than selling it.

=== Recent developments (since 2020) ===
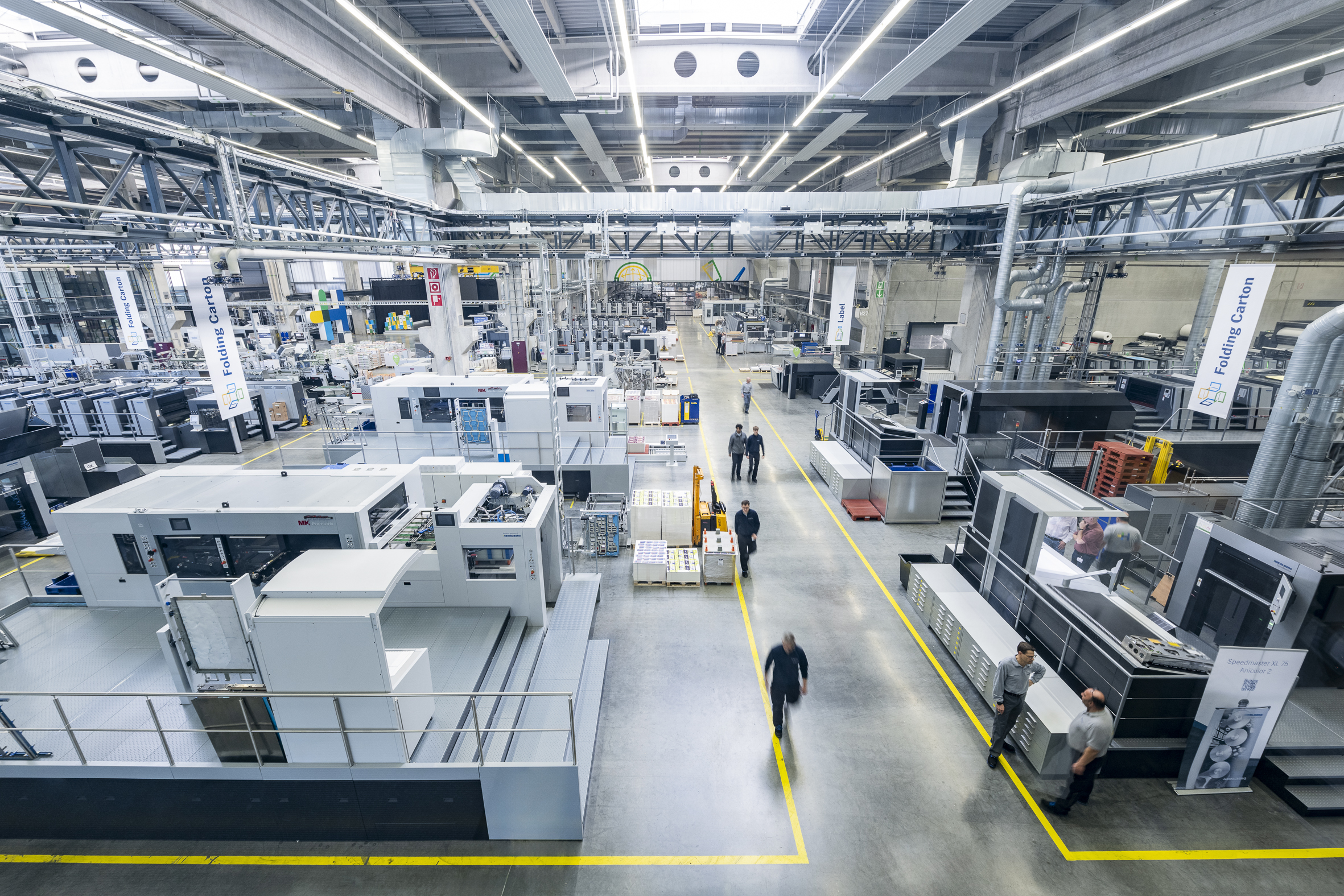
Print Media Center of Heidelberger Druckmaschinen

In March 2020, Deutsche Börse announced that Heidelberger Druckmaschinen AG would no longer be included in the SDAX. From 1998 until its relegation to the SDAX in 2012, Heidelberg had been part of the MDAX.

Also in 2020, it was announced that the company's pension fund would be dissolved, freeing up €380 million, thus making it possible to reduce a large part of the company's debts (from €250 to €43 million in net debt). Previously, employee representatives had to accept that pension provision would be increasingly geared to the company's operational success. Jens Koenen commented in Handelsblatt that the company was trying to "healthily shrink" from a large corporation to a medium-sized company after "the Internet had displaced printed products" in many areas.

Also in 2020, Heidelberger Druckmaschinen AG's subscription offer was expanded, whereby customers no longer pay for the machine used, but instead for the quantity of printed sheets.

In the following years, Heidelberg presented new products: a digital inkjet printing machine called Gallus One for the production of digital labels (2022), and the Boardmaster web flexo printing machine (2023). In the financial year from April 2023 to March 2024, sales amounted to around €2.4 billion and have been described as stable.

In February 2024, a cooperation was concluded between Heidelberger Druckmaschinen AG and the DB Bahnbau Gruppe (the railway construction division of Deutsche Bahn) to expand charging infrastructure throughout Germany using Amperfied charging systems. In May 2024, Heidelberger Druckmaschinen and Canon Inc. announced a worldwide cooperation in the areas of sales and service for inkjet printers. Heidelberger Druckmaschinen is developing a new inkjet product family under the name Jetfire, the technology of which is based on Canon printing machines. In summer 2024, the company ended the temporary short-time work, that had been implemented in January of the same year due to decreased demand.

To mark its 175th anniversary in 2025, the company organises various events. In the summer, a week of activities is held at its headquarters in Wiesloch-Walldorf in the newly redesigned demonstration centre, including an official anniversary ceremony.

== Locations ==
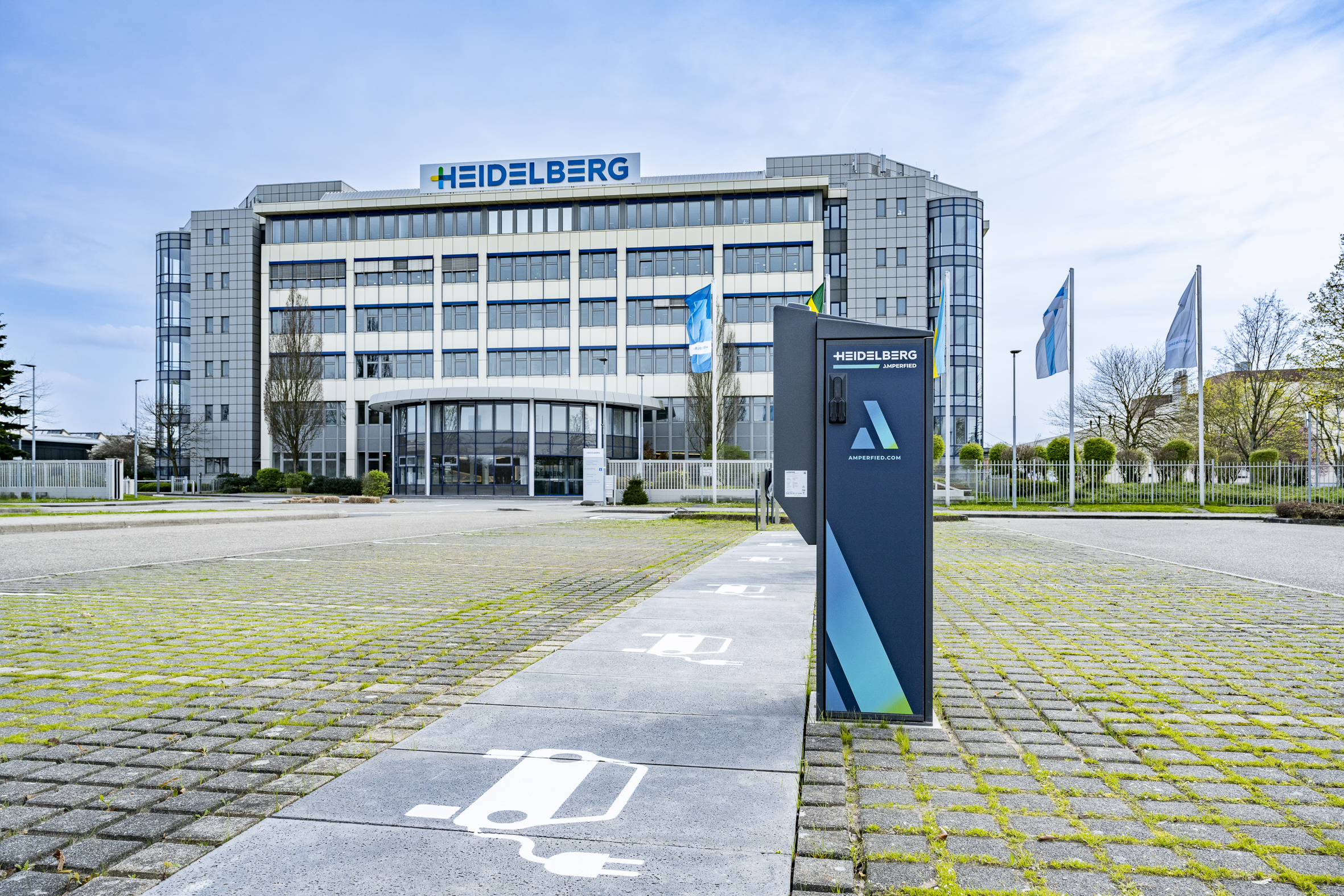
Administration building of the company in Wiesloch

The company's headquarters as well as research and development, sales, service, and the assembly facilities for most printing presses are located at Wiesloch-Walldorf, 13 kilometers south of Heidelberg. With almost 4000 employees and a space of 860,000 m², it is considered the world's largest printing press factory.

In 2018, the research and development center with its 900 employees was the last division to be relocated from its original site in Heidelberg to Wiesloch. The building in Heidelberg was taken over by Stadtwerke Heidelberg. After the sale of all administrative buildings in Heidelberg, the Print Media Academy was the only building owned by Heidelberger Druckmaschinen AG in Heidelberg. In 2020, Heidelberger Druckmaschinen removed its last employees from the city of Heidelberg. In 2021, the Print Media Academy was sold to a Luxembourg investment company.

Other production and development sites in Germany are located in Amstetten (foundry and metal casting), Brandenburg an der Havel (production and assembly of components), Kiel (software for prepress, process and postpress), Langgöns (development and production of label printing machines), Ludwigsburg (folding machine und mailing systems), and Weiden in der Oberpfalz (printing machines and punching).

Heidelberg opened a plant in China at the end of 2006. In Qingpu, Shanghai, around 400 employees primarily manufacture standardized printing presses in all common format classes for the Asian market. Since the sale of the sites for the production of pressroom chemicals in 2019, there are further production sites abroad in St. Gallen (label printing machines under the Gallus brand) and in the United States (folding machines for the brand Baumfolder). Around 87% of its turnover of €2.4 billion was generated abroad in the 2023/24 financial year.

== Products and machines ==
The company's largest product area is the manufacture of sheet-fed offset printing machines. Sheet-fed offset printing is mainly used for high-quality, multi-coloured printed products such as catalogues, illustrated books, calendars, posters, packaging and labels. Finishing techniques such as varnishes, special fragrances or unusual printing materials are increasingly utilized. Since the 1980s, the core business of Heidelberger Druckmaschinen AG has been sheet-fed offset printing machines and related software, despite expanding into other printing technologies through acquisitions. The company's newer product divisions are machines for packaging and label printing as well as wall charging stations. In addition, they manufacture folding machines for print finishing.

With a market share of around 40%, Heidelberg is the world market leader in its core business of sheet-fed offset printing presses as of 2018. In addition to the actual printing machines (press), the company also sells equipment for exposing the printing plates (prepress) and for further processing of the printed sheets, i.e. machines for cutting, folding and punching as well as cardboard box gluing machines (post press). In addition, they develop software components for integrating all processes in a printing company.

Since the 2008 financial crisis and increased industry consolidation within the printing industry, Heidelberg has sought new business areas, including wallboxes for electric cars, services, and consumables. The Heidelberg Industry division offers industrial customers mechanical and electric engineering services as well as casting, manufacting, assembly and electronics. At the beginning of 2025, the company announced an expansion of the charging infrastructure to industrial customers. For this purpose, electrolysers, systems for the production of hydrogen, are being developed. The first prototype is due to be presented in summer 2025.

Heidelberger Druckmaschinen AG has a 20% stake in Heidelberger InnovationLab GmbH, which was founded in 2008. The research company, whose other shareholders include BASF, SAP, the Karlsruhe Institute of Technology and the Heidelberg University, develops applications for printed organic electronics and technologies for their industrial production.

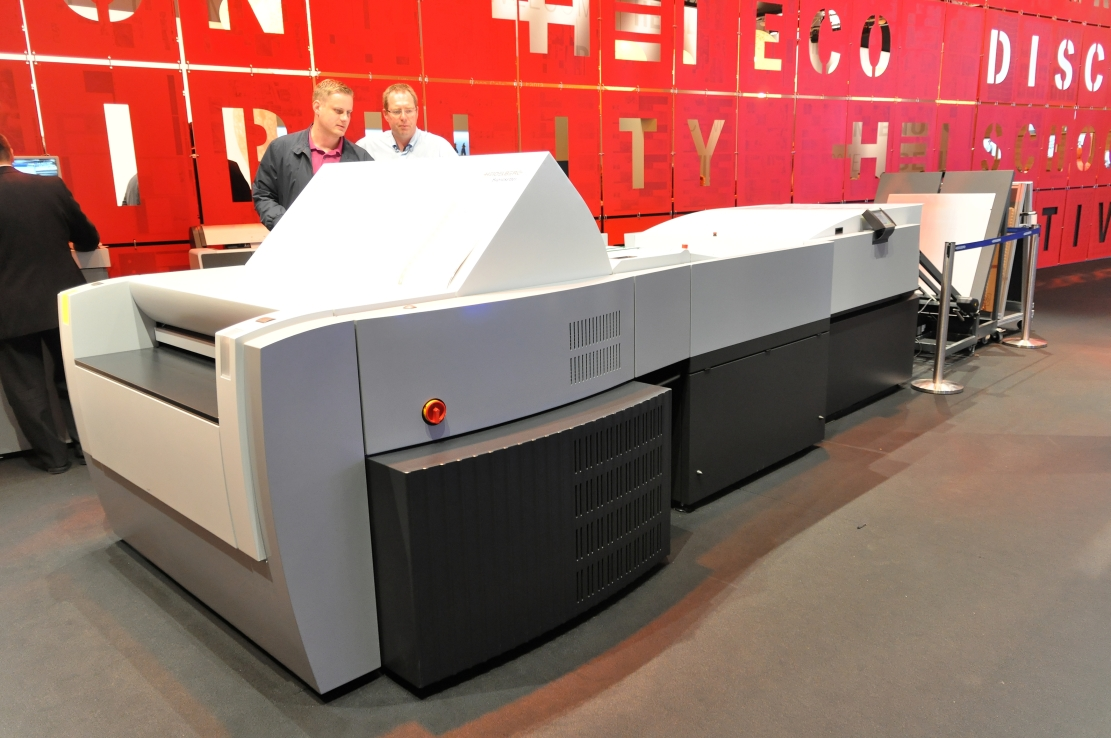
A platesetter for offset printing plates

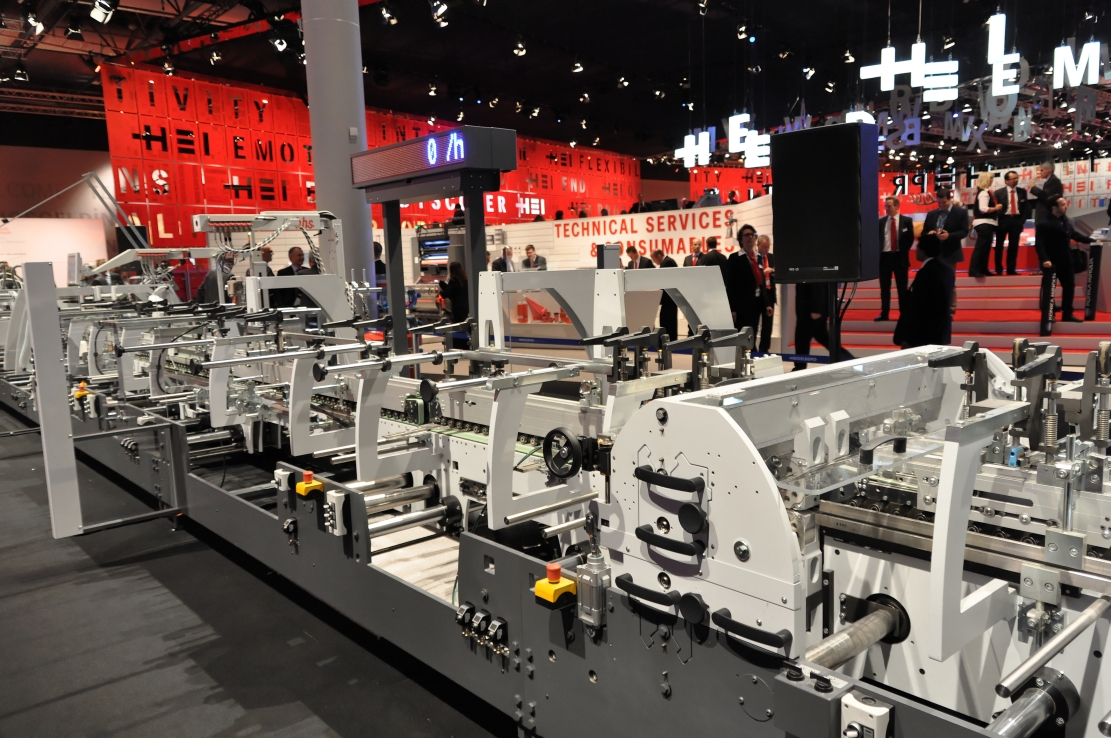
Folding carton gluing machines were built by Heidelberg until 2018 and have since been produced by Masterwork Machinery

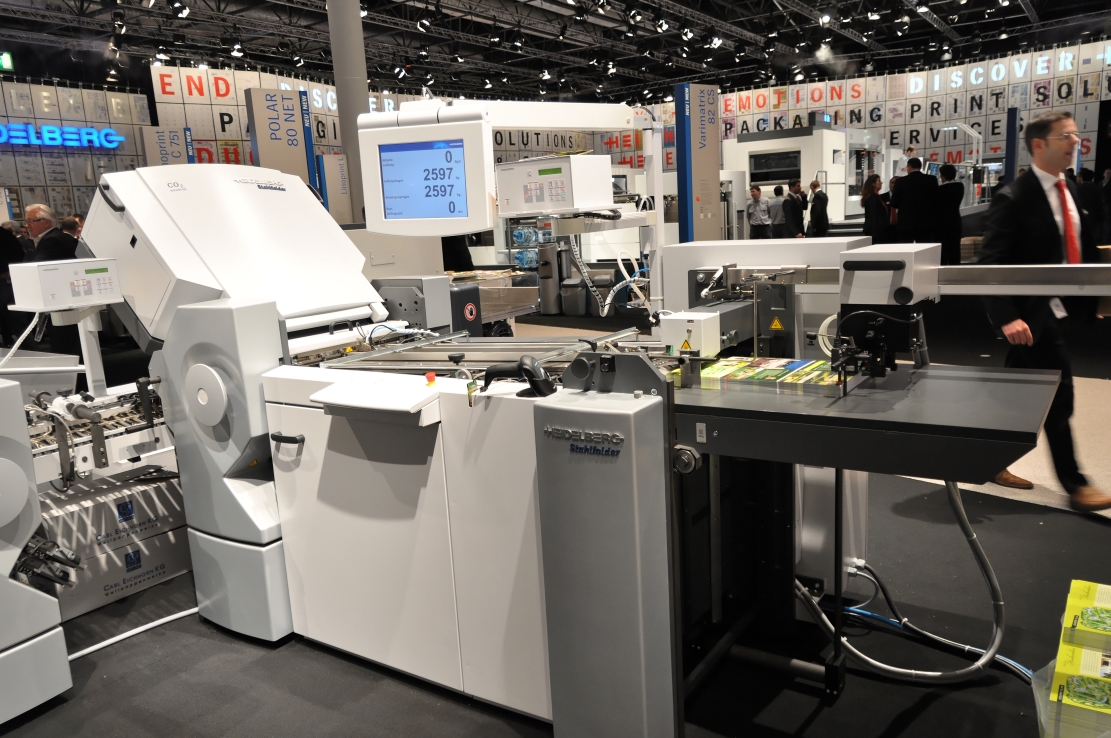
Since the takeover of Stahl GmbH & Co. KG in 1999, Heidelberger has been offering Stahlfolder folding machines

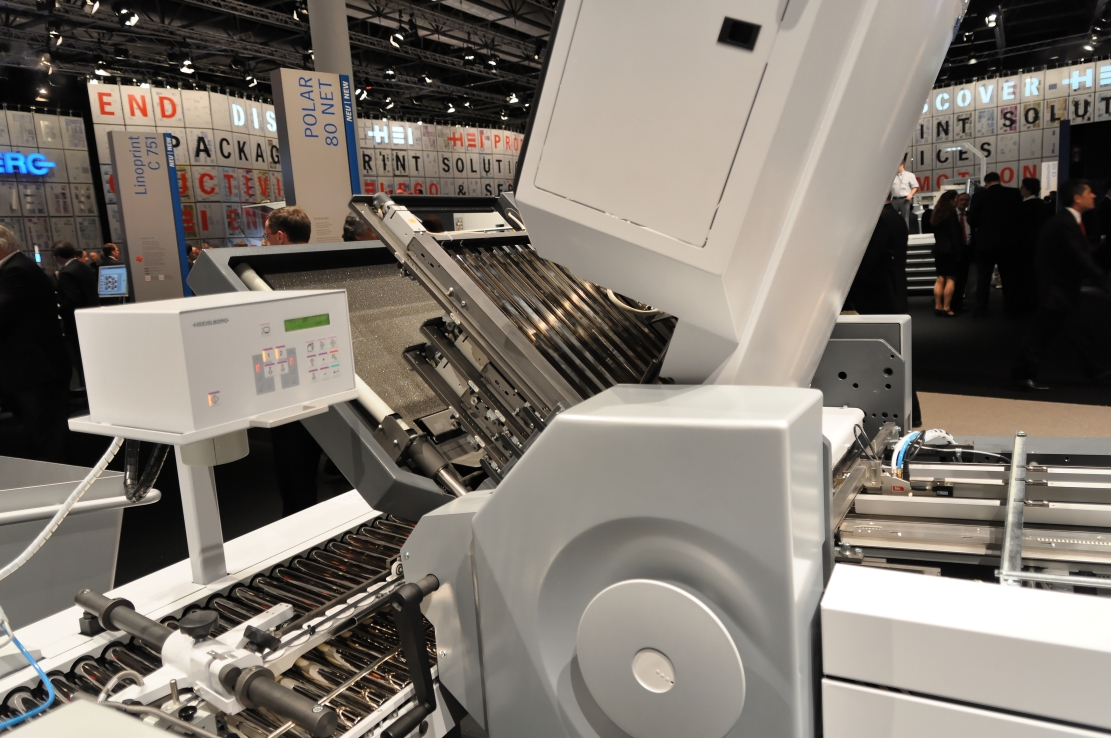
The same buckle plate folder with open folding unit

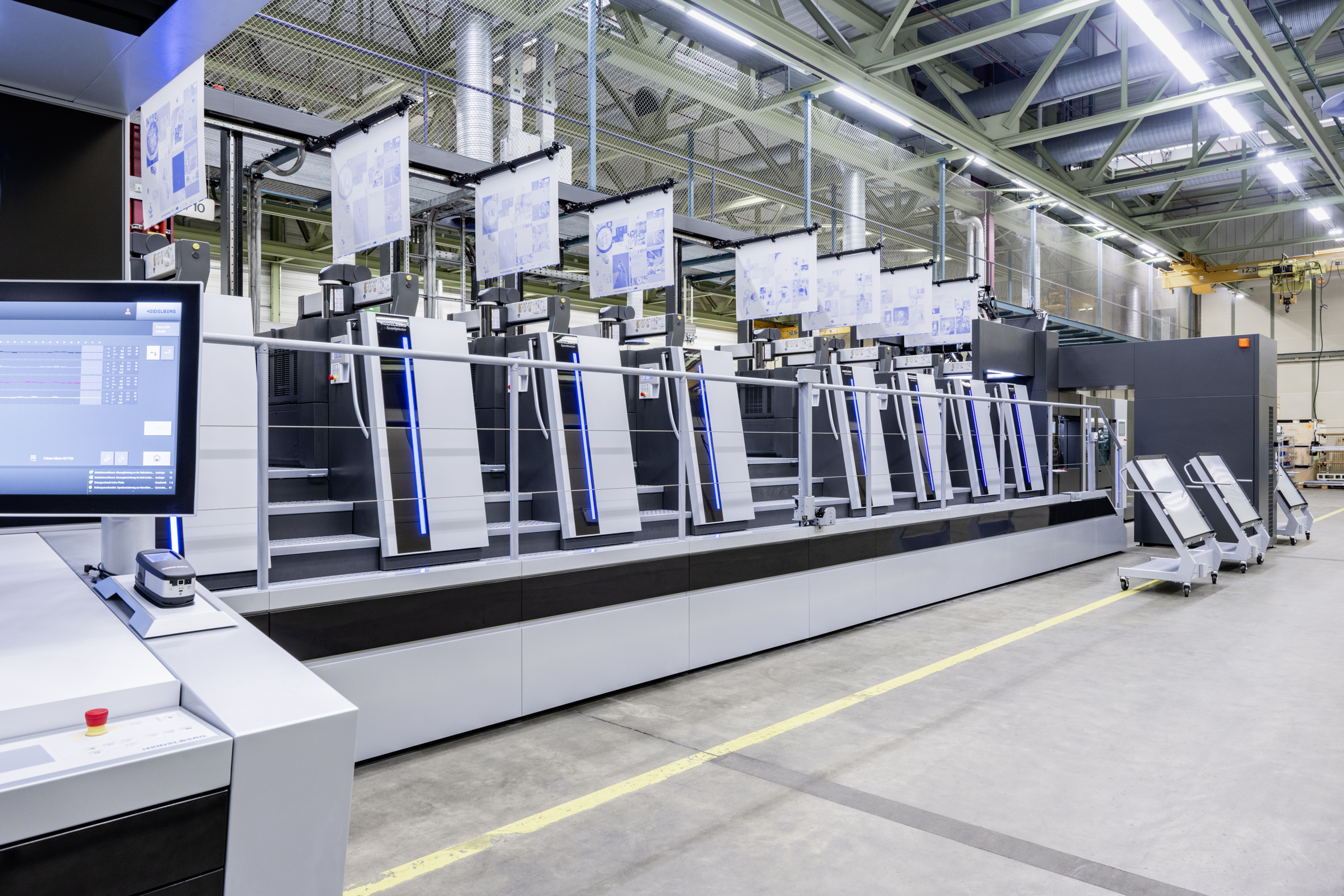
The Speedmaster XL printing press in 2024

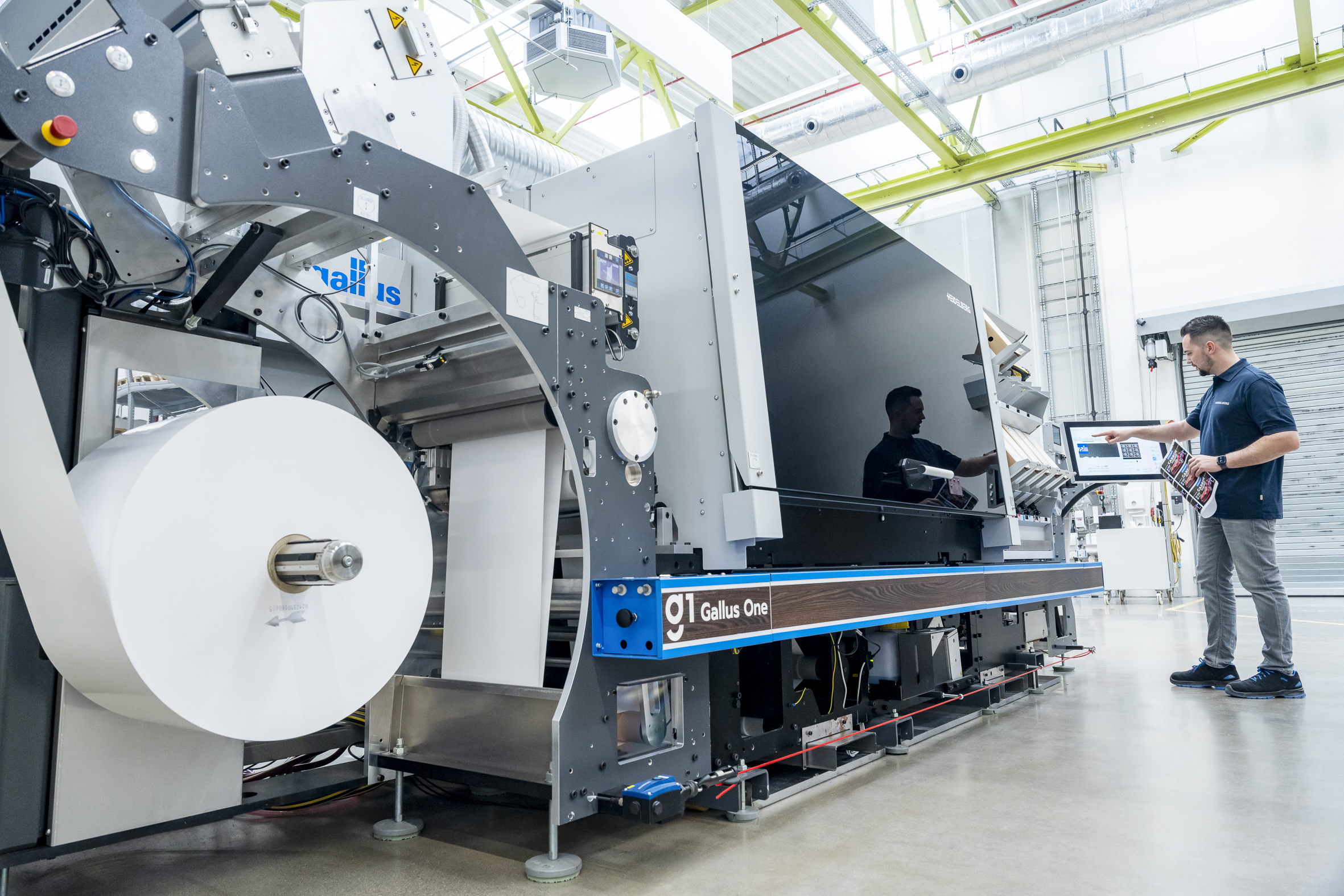
The Gallus One label printing machine, which has been in production since 2022

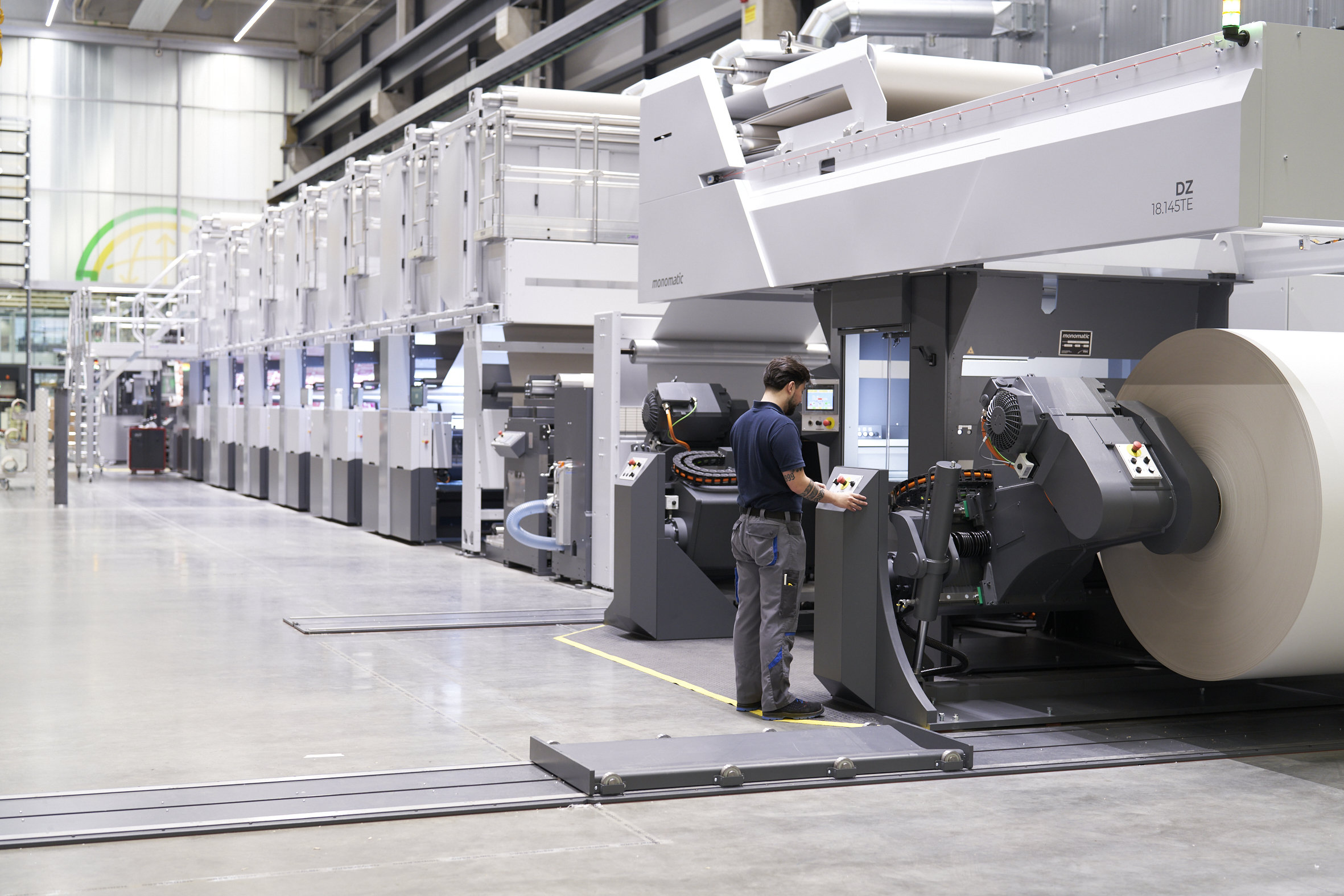
The Boardmaster packaging press has been in production since 2023

=== Overview of machines up to 1919 ===
1860	Smoothing presses and satin finishing machines
1861	High-speed presses, manual and smoothing presses, satin finishing machines
1895	Pro Patria, high-speed cylinder press by Andr. Hamm
1895	High-speed press by Wilhelm Müller
1896	Folding machine by Wilhelm Müller
1914	First presentation of the Original Heidelberg Platen Press (also known as Original Heidelberg Tiegel, OHT)

=== Overview of machines from 1919 onwards ===
The following table provides an overview of the printing press families produced by Schnellpressenfabrik AG Heidelberg and Heidelberger Druckmaschinen AG after 1919:

Type of	Production period	Machines produced	Additional informations
Schnellpresse Exquisit	1919–1931	unknown	
Tiegeldruckautomat (Super-Heidelberger)	1921–1985	144.900	
Großer Tiegel (Großer Heidelberger)	1932–1985	20.200	
Zylinderautomat (S-Buchdruck)	1935–1979	39.200	
OHZ - Original Heidelberger Zylinder	1937-??? (perhaps 1962)	unknown	OHZ is not to be confused with the cylinder letterpress series SB-S etc.
Kleiner Zylinderautomat (K-Buchdruck)	1957–1979	22.700	
K-Offset (KOR)	1962–1985	38.800	The company's first offset press.
Rotaspeed	1965–1976	2.700 DW	DW stands for printing units. Offered as a litho and offset machine, first machine series in large format up to 145cm.
S-Offset	1967–2000	37.300 DW	
GTO	1972–2014	>106.000 DW	
Speedmaster	1974–		Speedmaster emerged from the SORM series and was initially sold as such (SORM-V) in the 72cm format, from 1977 the name changed to Speedmaster and the size 102cm was also offered.
Mainstream 80	2000–2004		Web offset press for newspaper printing. Marketed as "Goss Mainstream" after the sale of the web offset business to Goss.
Versafire (Linoprint)	2013–		Digital printing machines for smaller print runs. Developed in collaboration with Ricoh.
Omnifire (Jetmaster)	2015–		Digital inkjet machine for printing three-dimensional objects.
Primefire	2016–2020		Digital printing press for industrial packaging printing, developed in collaboration with Fujifilm.
Gallus One	2022–		Inkjet machine with hardware and software to produce high-quality labels.
Boardmaster	2023–		Flexographic printing press for the packaging market.
Jetfire	2024–		Digital printing machine with inkjet technology.

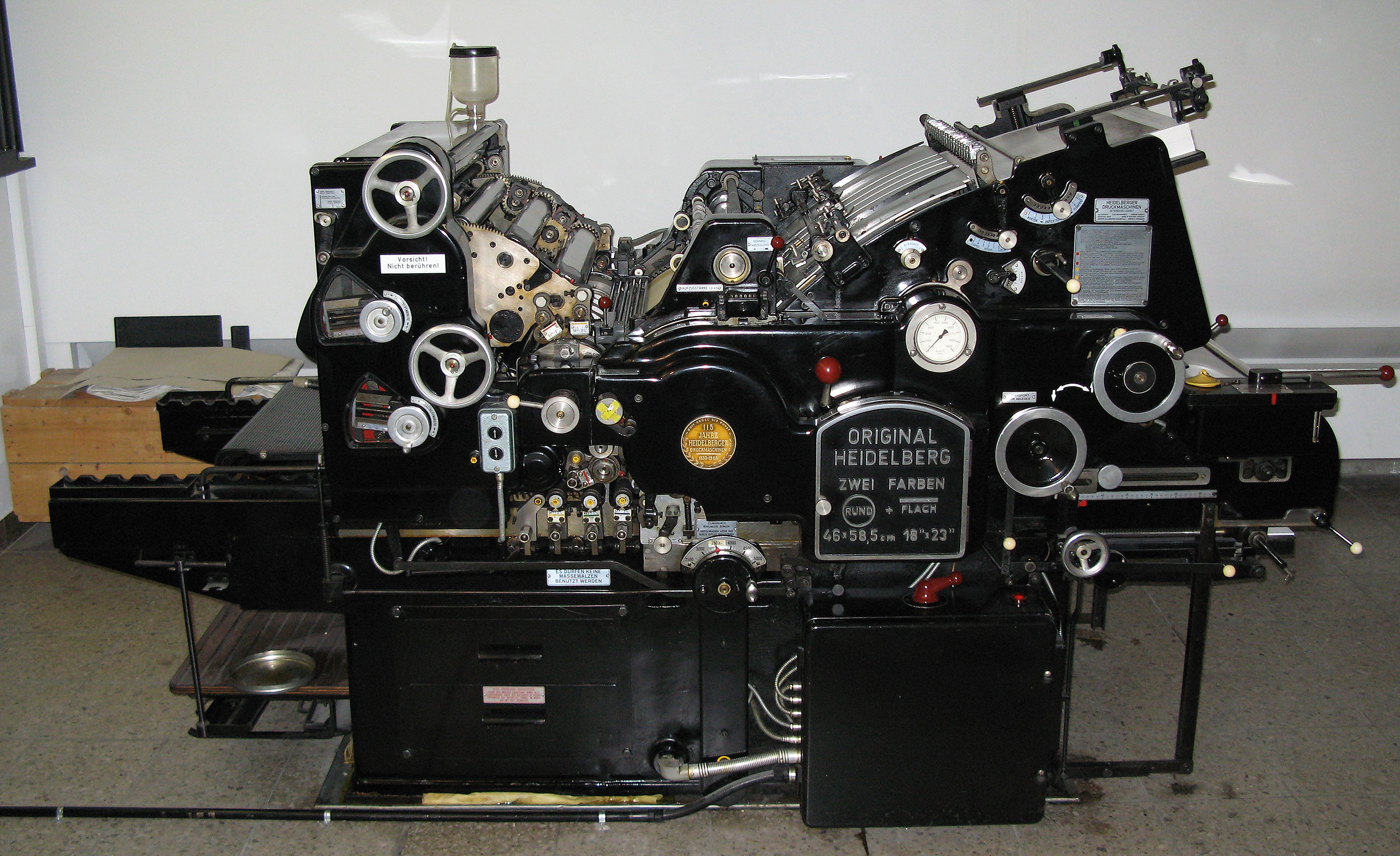
Heidelberg cylinder printing press

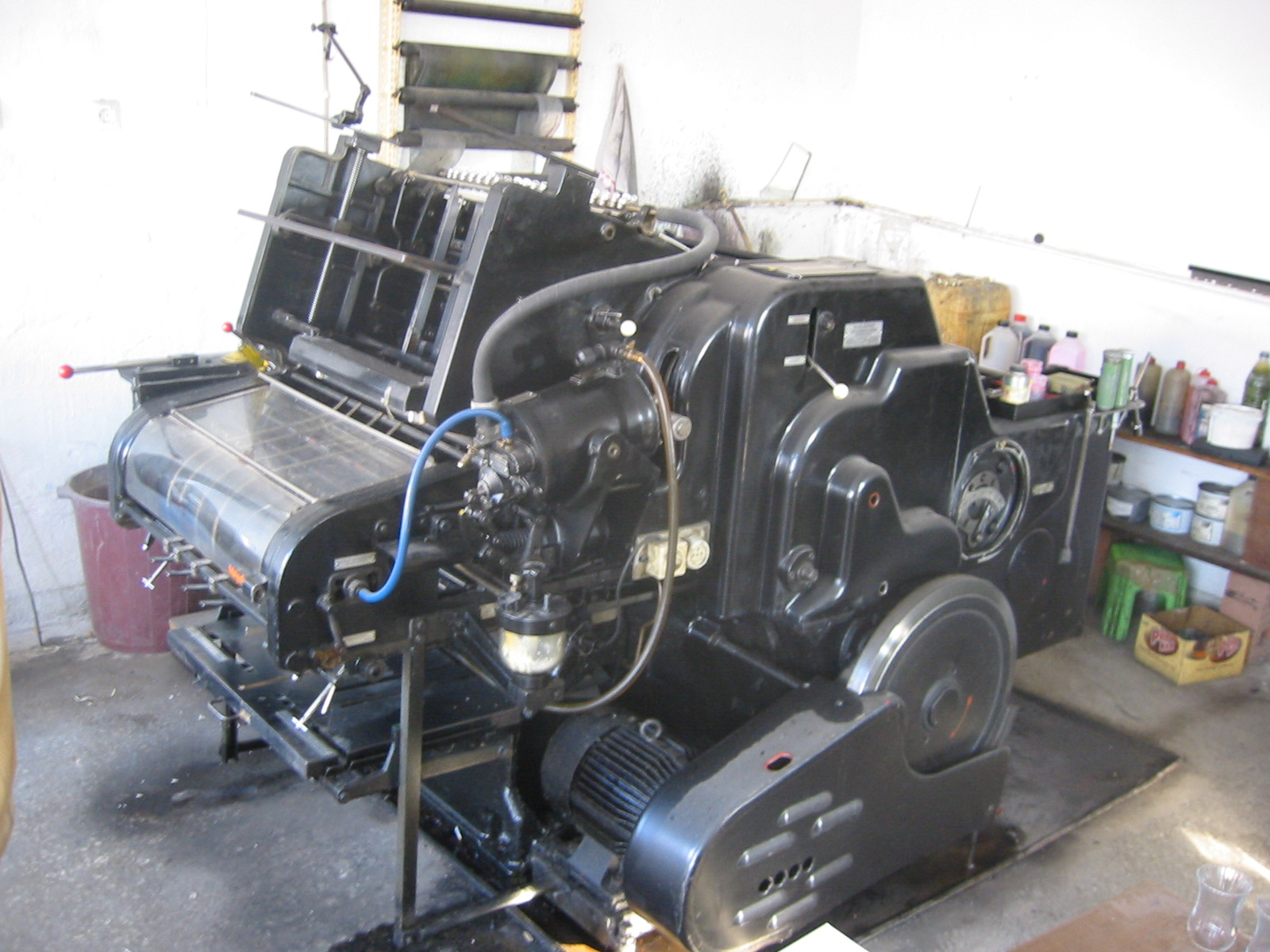
Heidelberg KOR offset press, the first offset series from Heidelberg
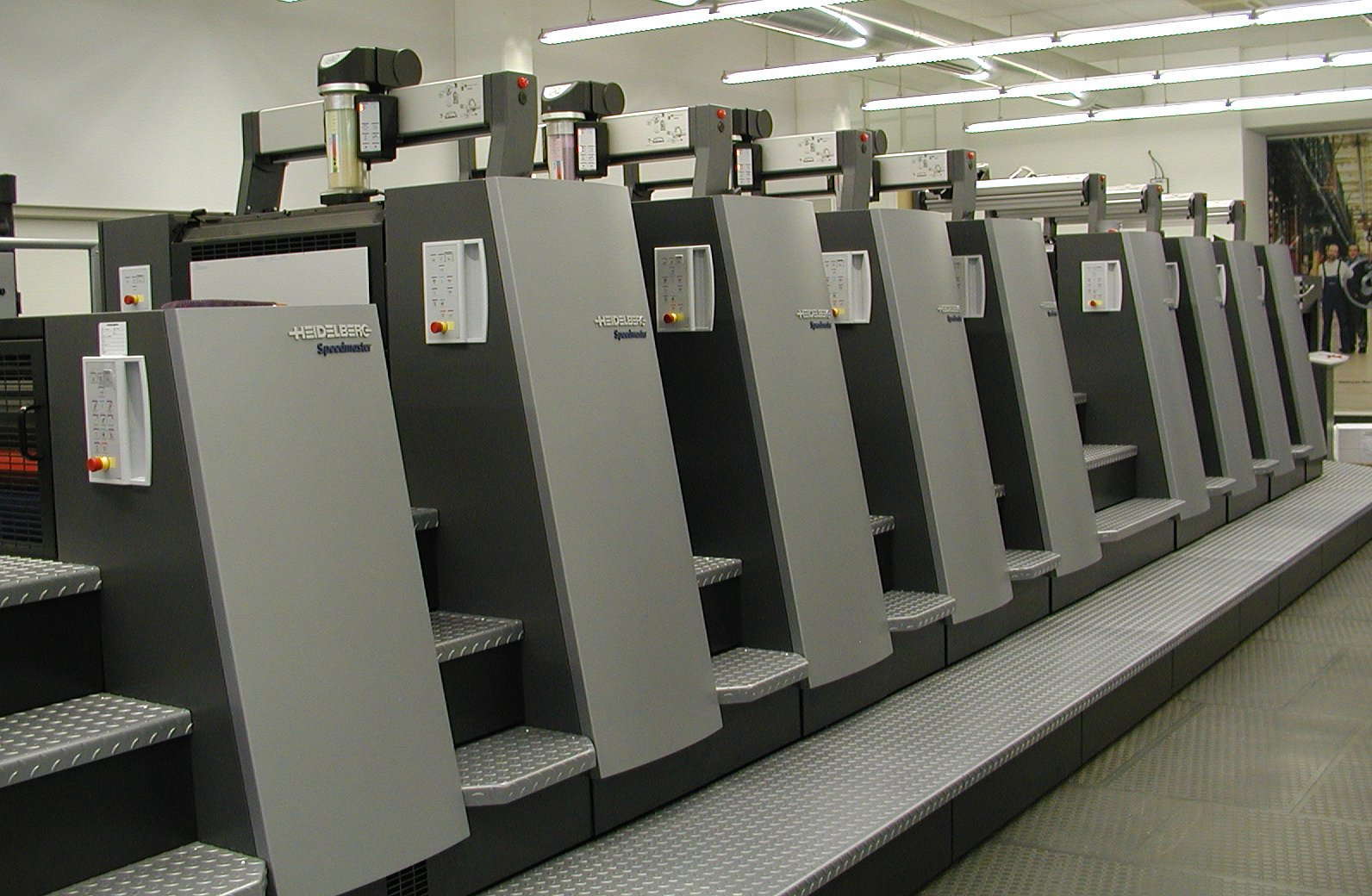
8-color Speedmaster CD 74 press with coating unit

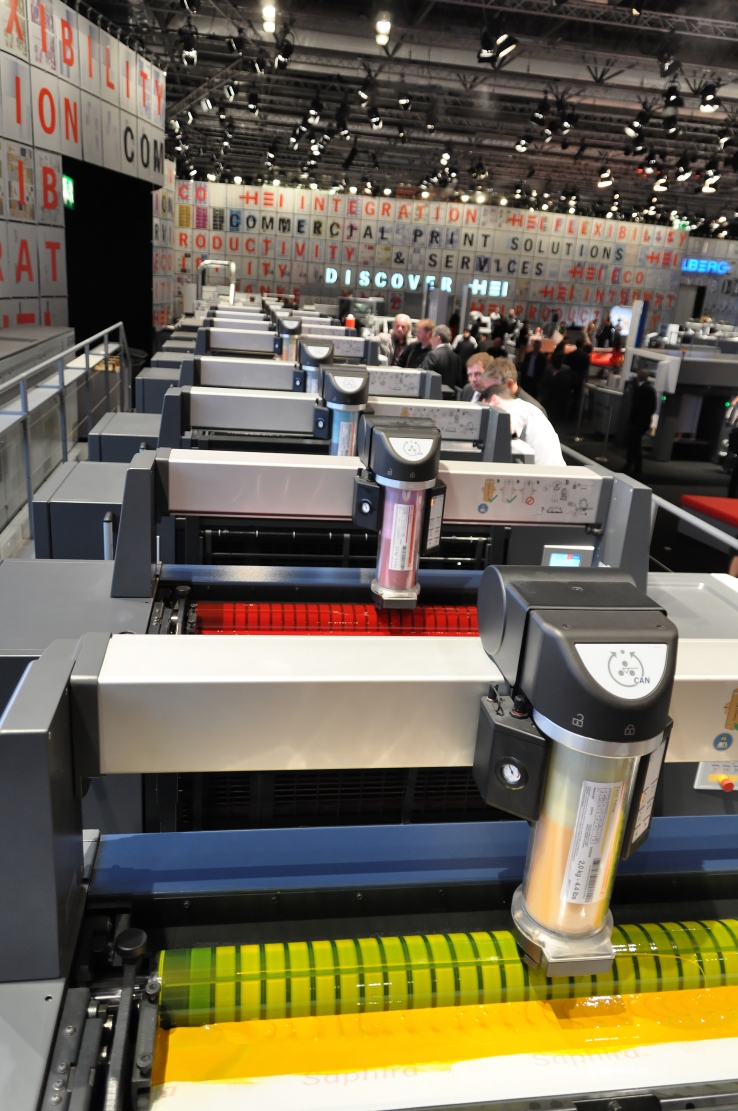
Speedmaster

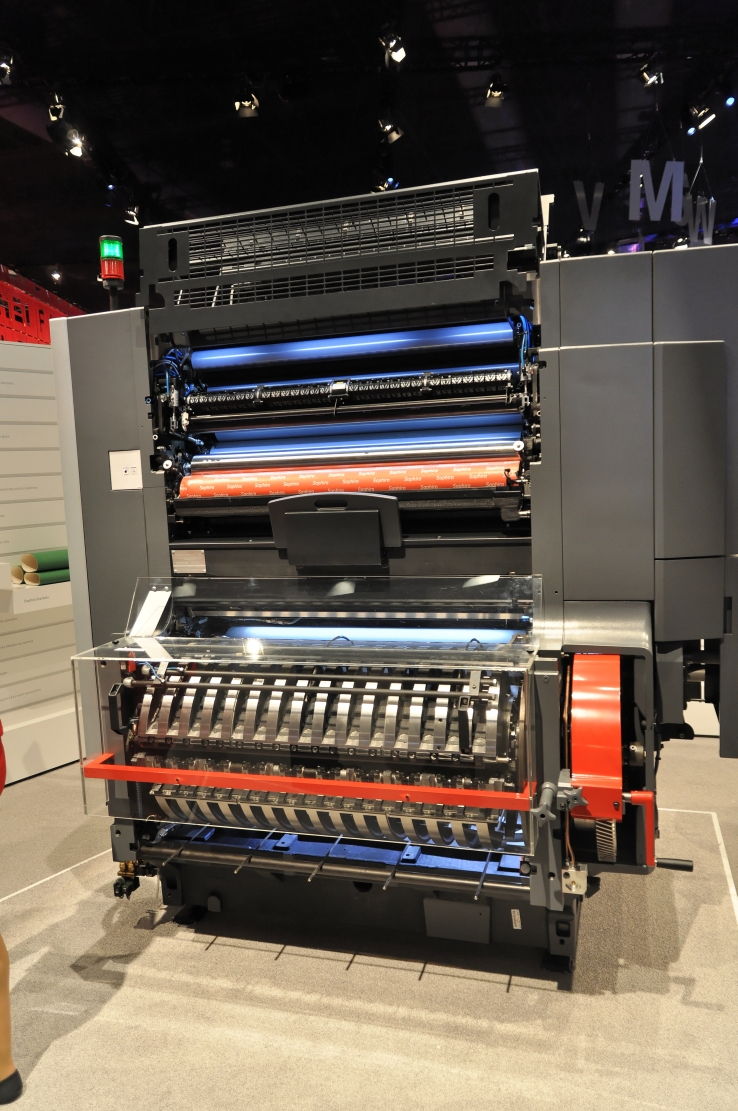
Printing unit of a Speedmaster

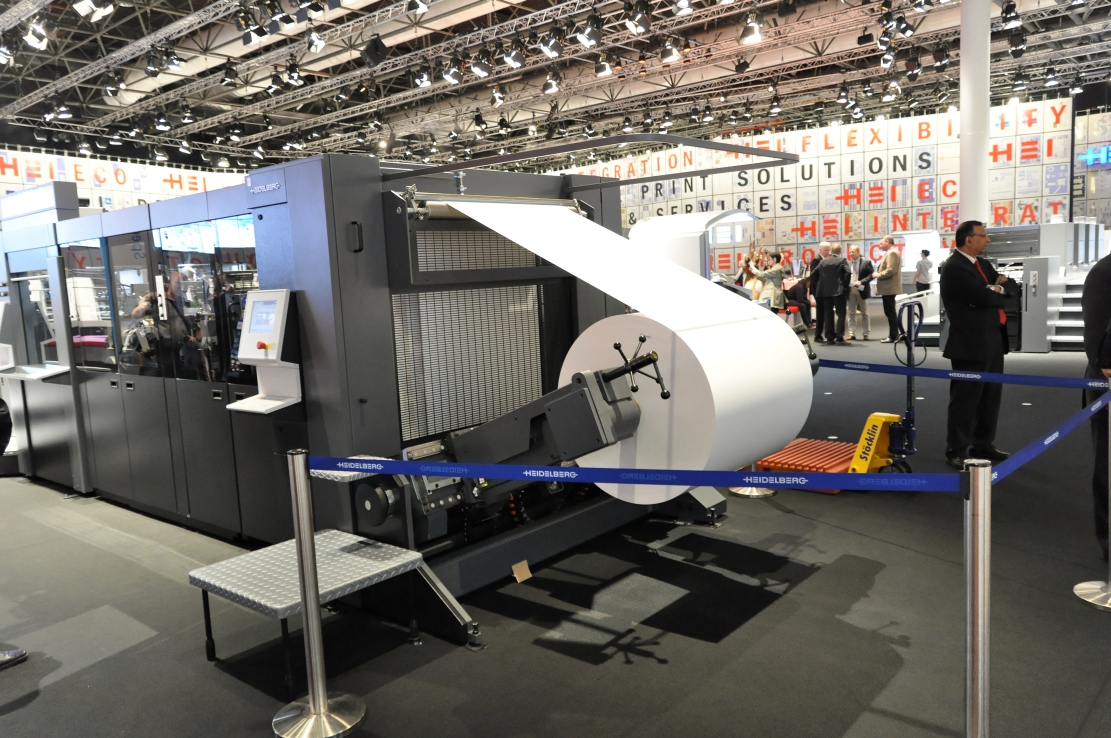
The paper on a roll can be printed in sheetfed offset using a roll sheeter.

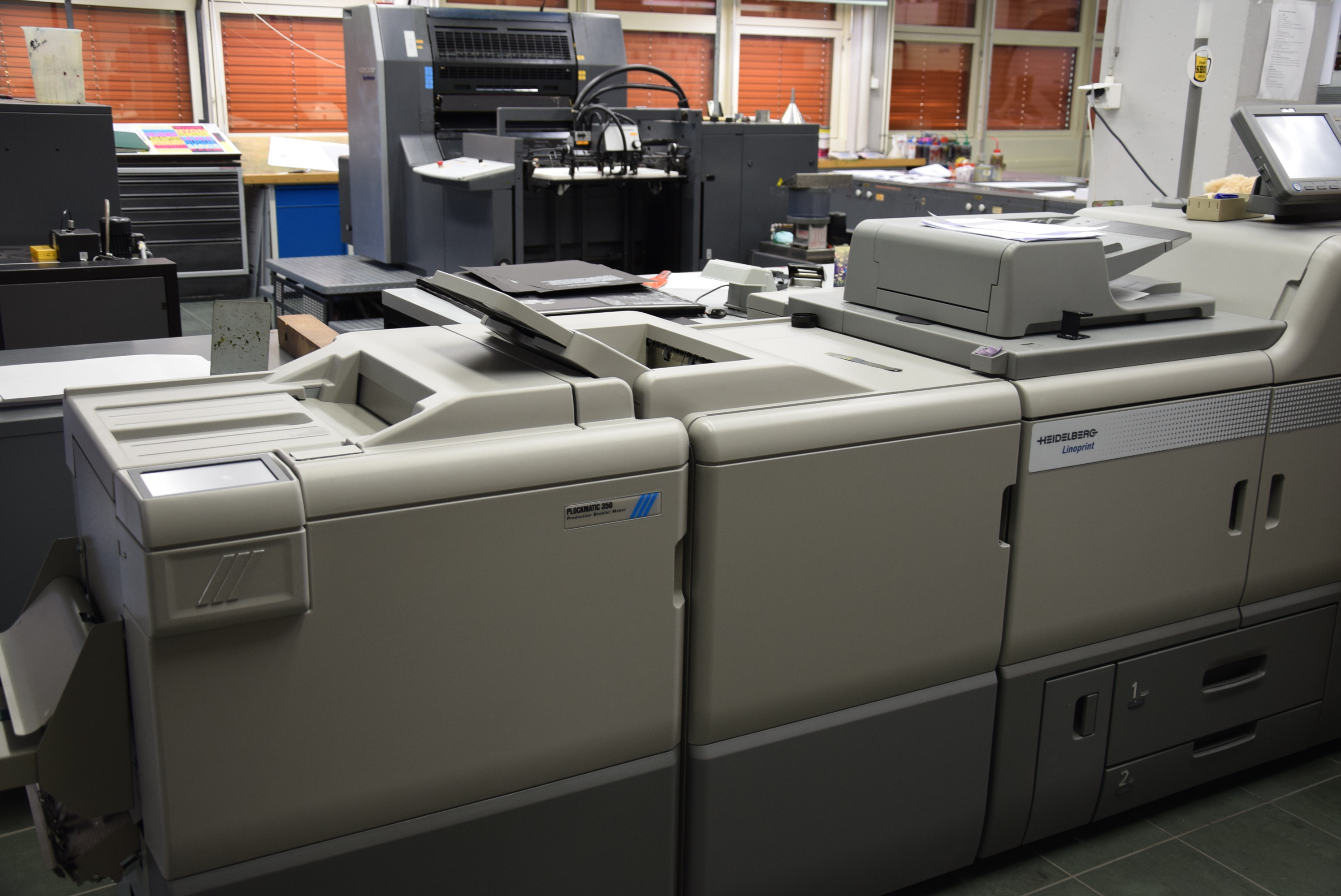
In the foreground a Linoprint digital printing machine, in the background a Heidelberg offset printing unit

In addition to printing, the Heidelberg Platen Press could also be used for punching work, as can be seen here.

== Literature ==
- Martin Krauß (2000). Vom Glockenguss zum Offsetdruck. Geschichte der Heidelberger Druckmaschinen AG. Ubstadt-Weiher: Publisher Regionalkultur. ISBN 978-3-89735-148-6.
- 150 Jahre Heidelberger Druckmaschinen-Aktiengesellschaft: 1850–2000. Heidelberg: Heidelberger Druckmaschinen-AG. 2000. ISBN 978-3-00-006068-7.

== Media ==
- Immer unter Druck – Die Heidelberger Druckmaschinen AG. Documentary film, Germany 2018, 29:45 minutes. Written and directed by Eberhard Reuß, Production: SWR. Shown as part of the TV series made in Südwest.
