= Windmill Hill =

Windmill Hill may refer to:

== Australia ==
- Windmill Hill, Appin, a heritage-listed former farm and now water catchment area in Wollondilly Shire, New South Wales
- Windmill Hill, Sydney, New South Wales, former name of Observatory Park, Sydney

== United Kingdom ==
- Windmill Hill, Avebury, a Neolithic causewayed enclosure in Wiltshire, England
  - Windmill Hill culture, named after the Avebury site but now considered as several separate archaeological cultures
- Windmill Hill, Bristol, a predominantly residential area within Bedminster, Bristol
- Windmill Hill, Buckinghamshire, an archive and office complex near Waddesdon Manor
- Windmill Hill, East Sussex, a village in the civil parish of Herstmonceux
- Windmill Hill, Hampshire, a chalk hill in East Hampshire
- Windmill Hill, Kent, an area of Gravesend, Kent
- Windmill Hill, Somerset, a small village and civil parish

== United States ==
- Windmill Hill (Dublin, New Hampshire), house listed on the National Register of Historic Places
- Windmill Hill Historic District, Jamestown, Rhode Island, listed on the National Register of Historic Places

== Other ==
- Windmill Hill, Gibraltar

== See also ==
- Windmill Hill Mill, Herstmonceux
