= Heidelberg Platen Press =

Printing press made from 1923 to 1985

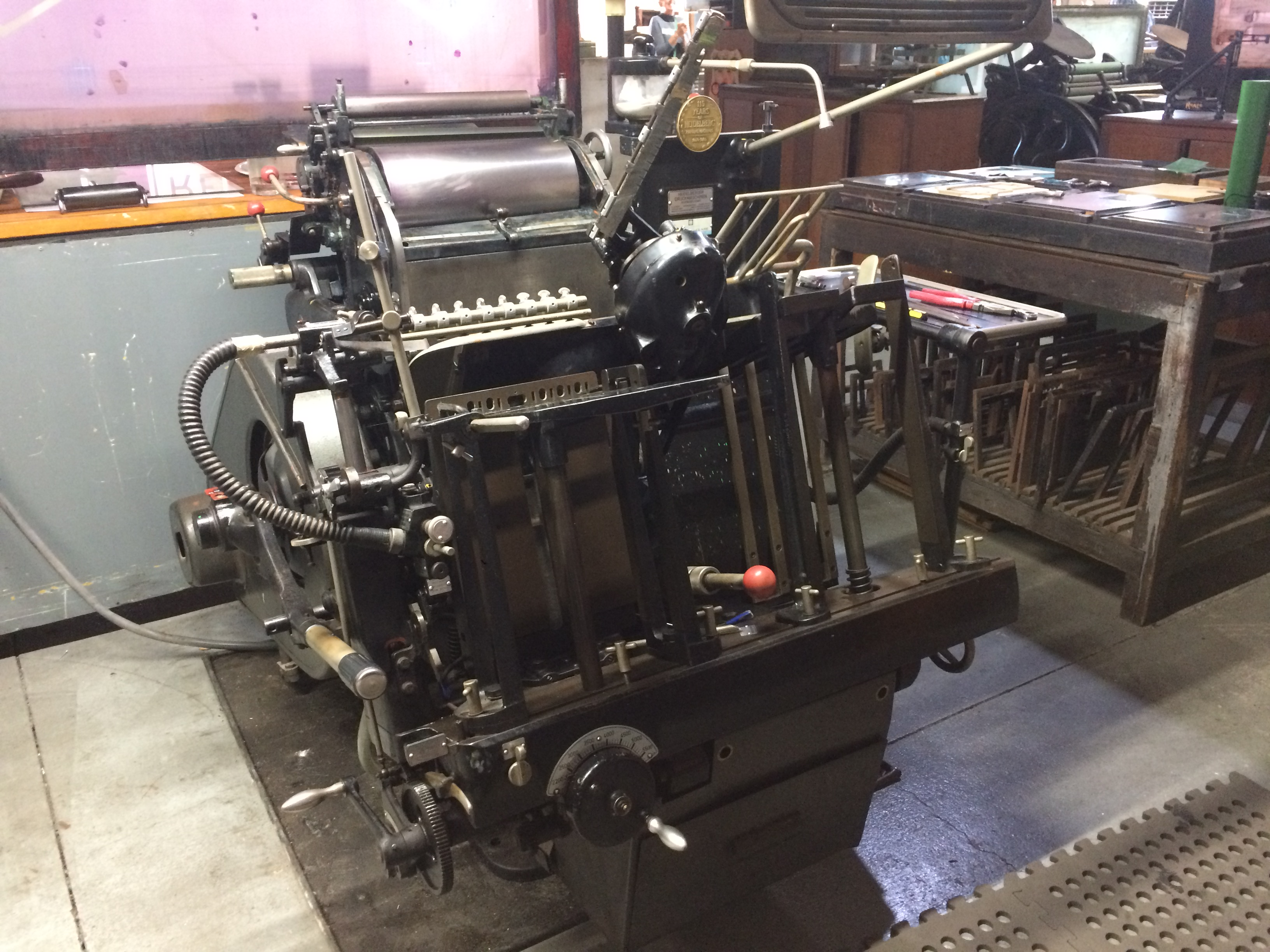
Original Heidelberg Platen Press

The Original Heidelberg Platen Press was a letterpress printing press manufactured by the Heidelberger Druckmaschinen company in Germany. It was often referred to as the Heidelberg Windmill, after the shape and movement of its paper feed system. When introduced, it was also called the "Super Heidelberg" or the "Super Speed".

== History ==
The Original Heidelberg Platen Press was introduced in 1914 and manufactured between 1923 and 1985.

Although the Original Heidelberg Platen Press is no longer being manufactured, it is still in wide use for commercial and enthusiast letterpress printing.

The company later also produced the Original Heidelberg Cylinder Press and today produces offset presses and printing related products.

== Design and operation ==
The printing press is most famous for its windmill-like automatic paper feed mechanism. There are two blades that rotate from the paper feed, where it picks up a sheet of paper; to the platen, where the printing impression is made; to the delivery rack, where the paper is released; followed by the blade pointing straight up ready to start the next cycle. There are two blades mounted on opposite sides of the rotor (when one blade is picking up the next sheet, the other blade is releasing the previously printed sheet). In addition, if the press is set for precision registration ("with gauges"), the feed arm drops the sheet onto moving gauge blocks that then pull it into precise alignment just before the press closes, then picks it back up to carry it to the delivery rack.

A clamshell-like mechanism performs the actual printing. In letterpress an impression is made on the paper by having a platen press the paper against a forme. The forme has the desired image in reverse: with raised parts where the ink is applied, and lowered parts where the ink is not applied. When a rotor has moved a page to the platen, the platen is pressed against the forme to make the impression (where ink is transferred from the form to the paper). The platen then opens up to release the printed page and allow the rollers to apply more ink to the forme. This cycle repeats for the next page.

The Original Heidelberg Platen Press also automatically inks the rollers. Ink can be added to a reservoir, or fountain, which is then spread evenly via several rollers before reaching the rollers which make contact with the forme.

The press is driven by an electric motor that runs a flywheel. The press also contains an air pump. Air suction is used to pick up the next sheet of paper from the feed pile, so the blade can grab it as it comes around.

=== Models ===
Two models of the press were manufactured: the Original Heidelberg 10" x 15" and the larger Original Heidelberg 13" x 18" that can print on larger sheets of paper.
