= Windmill Hill (Dublin, New Hampshire) =

Historic house in New Hampshire, United States

- U.S. National Register of Historic Places
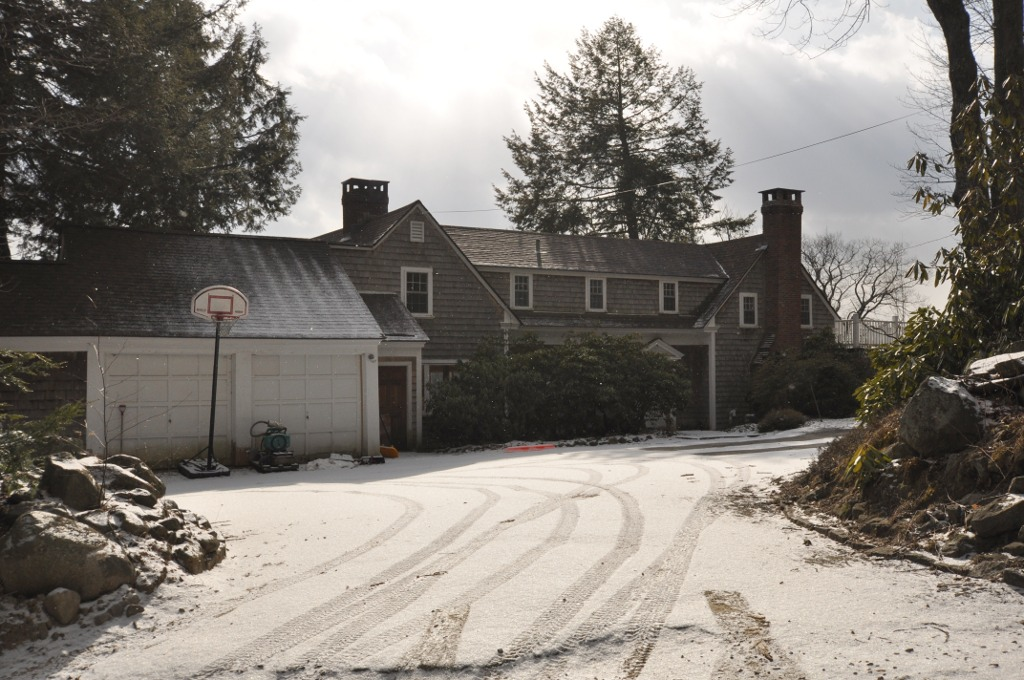

- Location within New Hampshire Location within the United States
- Location: Windmill Hill Rd., Dublin, New Hampshire
- Coordinates: 42°53′14″N 72°2′9″W
- Area: 4 acres (1.6 ha)
- Built: 1934
- Architect: Epps, Thomas Byrd
- Architectural style: Colonial Revival
- MPS: Dublin MRA
- NRHP reference No.: 83004087
- Added to NRHP: December 18, 1983

Windmill Hill is an historic house on Windmill Hill Road in Dublin, New Hampshire. Built in 1934, it is a fine example of Colonial Revival architecture, built as a summer house in the style of a traditional New England farmhouse. The house was listed on the National Register of Historic Places in 1983.

== Description and history ==
Windmill Hill is located in a rural setting of southeastern Dublin, on the south side of Windmill Hill Road. It sits on about 4 acres (1.6 ha) of land, which slope steeply away from the road to the southeast, providing views of Mount Monadnock and the hills of Peterborough. It is a 1 1/2-story wood-frame structure built in a U shape with gabled roofs and shingled exterior. A rubblestone terrace wall provides a level grassy area behind the house. Its windows are six-over-six sash throughout, and there are gabled dormers piercing the roof of the central section.

The house was designed by Boston architect Thomas Byrd Epps, and built in 1934 for Priscilla Prince Whitney. Originally built as a summer residence, it has been weatherized for year-round occupation. At the time of its National Register listing in 1983, it was still owned by the Whitney family.

== See also ==
- National Register of Historic Places listings in Cheshire County, New Hampshire
