= Windmill Point Light (Michigan) =

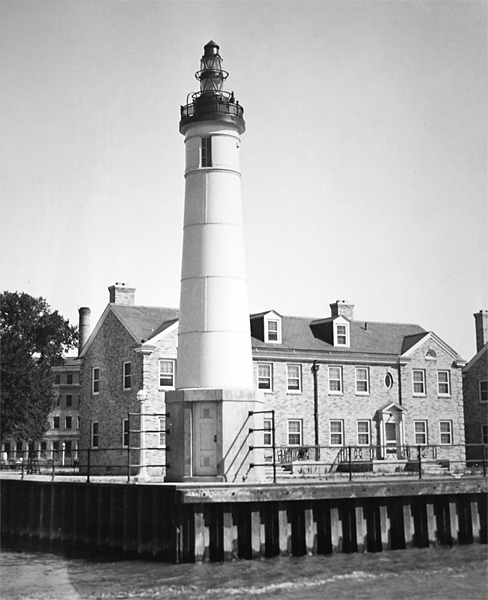
- Location: Detroit, United States
- Coordinates: 42°21′27″N 82°55′54″W

Tower
- Constructed: 1933
- Height: 45 ft (14 m)
- Shape: cylinder

Light
- Lens: sixth order Fresnel lens
- Intensity: 12,000 candela

The Windmill Point Light was a lighthouse built in 1838 at the confluence of the Detroit River and Lake St. Clair in the U.S. state of Michigan. It was funded by a Congressional appropriation of $5,000 in March 1837. The current structure, which dates from 1933, has an octagonal base made of concrete which is one story tall, topped by a 33-foot cylindrical white steel-plate tower. The total height of the structure is 45 feet. The first lighthouse keeper was John Martin, a veteran of the War of 1812.
