= Windmill Point Light (Virginia) =

Lighthouse in Virginia, United States

- Location: Mouth of the Rappahannock River east of Windmill Point
- Coordinates: 37.5968°N 76.2359°W

Tower
- Foundation: screw-pile
- Construction: cast-iron/wood
- Height: 36 feet (11 m)
- Shape: hexagonal house

Light
- First lit: 1869
- Deactivated: 1965
- Focal height: 10.5 m (34 ft)
- Lens: sixth-order Fresnel lens
- Range: 7.8 nautical miles; 14 kilometres (9 mi)
- Characteristic: Flashing 6 sec

The Windmill Point Light was a lighthouse located at the mouth of the Rappahannock River.

== History ==
This light was erected in 1869 to replace the last of three lightships stationed at this location to mark the end of the Rappahannock Spit, a shoal extending east from Windmill Point itself. These lightships were stationed beginning in 1839, the first being seized by the Confederates in the Civil War. As was typical of such an exposed location, ice was a serious threat, and the light was badly damaged in the winter of 1917–1918, with repairs not completed until 1921.

Automation came in 1954, and the house was removed in favor of a skeleton tower in 1965. As with the nearby Stingray Point Light, a private party, one Dr William Atwood, purchased portions of the house in hopes of reassembling it on shore. As with the other light, however, Dr Atwood was unable to complete his plan. The tower and original foundation remain in service.

As of the 2007–2008 winter, the old girder works of the original lighthouse were removed and replaced by a single concrete-filled caisson with superstructure tower and light and placards. Note the rip rap of the original light surrounds the new structure, which is right at sea level and sometimes not visible. The lighthouse should not be approached within a 100-foot radius.

On Sunday 25 May 2008 a sailboat went aground on these rocks and required USCG and Sea Tow assistance to be towed off.

On Friday 11 Oct 2019 a sailboat went aground on these rocks and required USCG and Marine Conservation Police assistance to be towed off. Massive damage and almost loss of vessel.

Both Windmill Point Light, and Stingray Point Light have this old rip rap remaining at or below sea level. DO NOT maneuver close to either of these lighthouses!
