= Stevensburg, Virginia =

Unincorporated community in Virginia, United States

Coordinates: 38°26′29″N 77°53′59″W

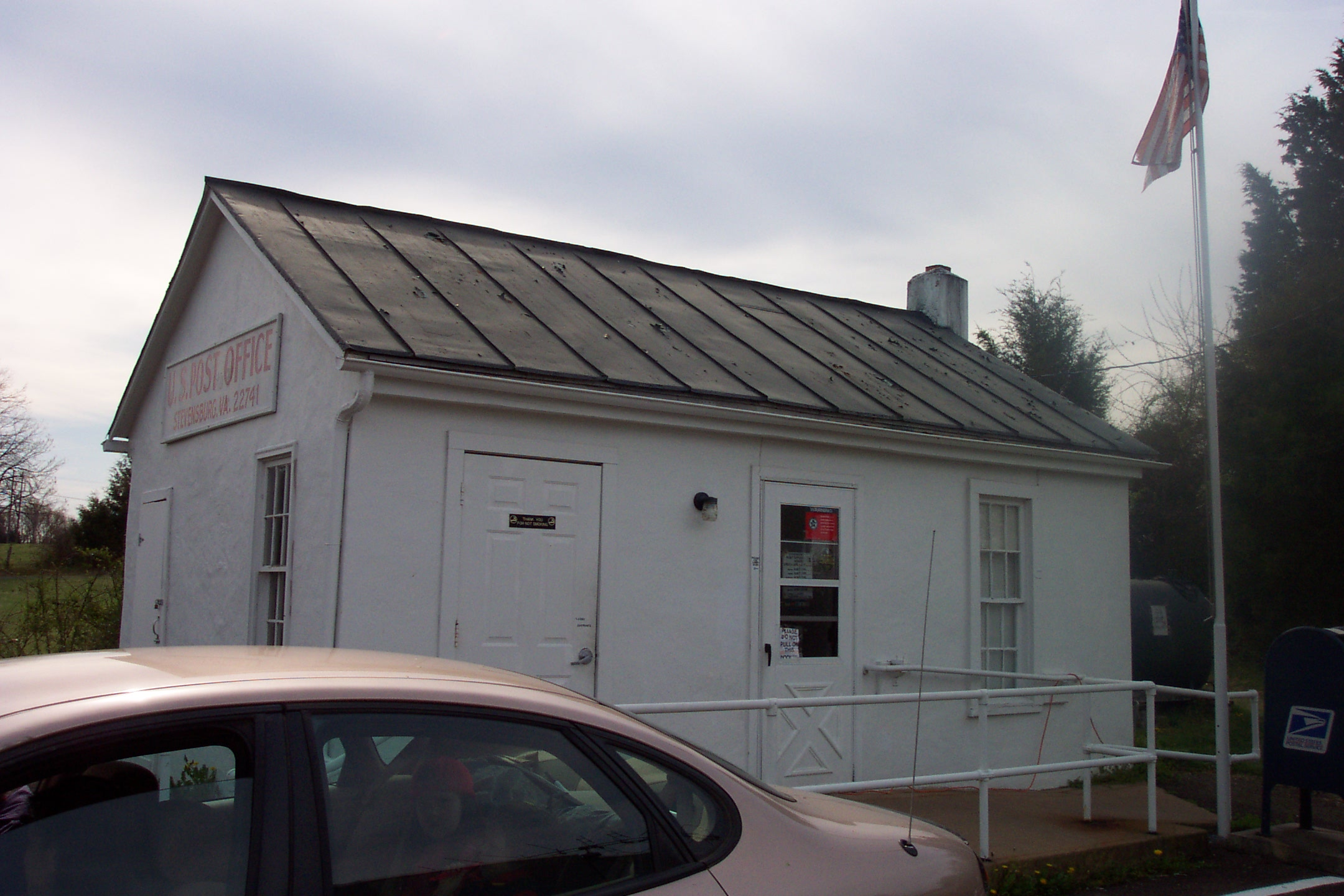
The Stevensburg Post office, at about 10 by 15 feet, is one of the smallest post offices in America.

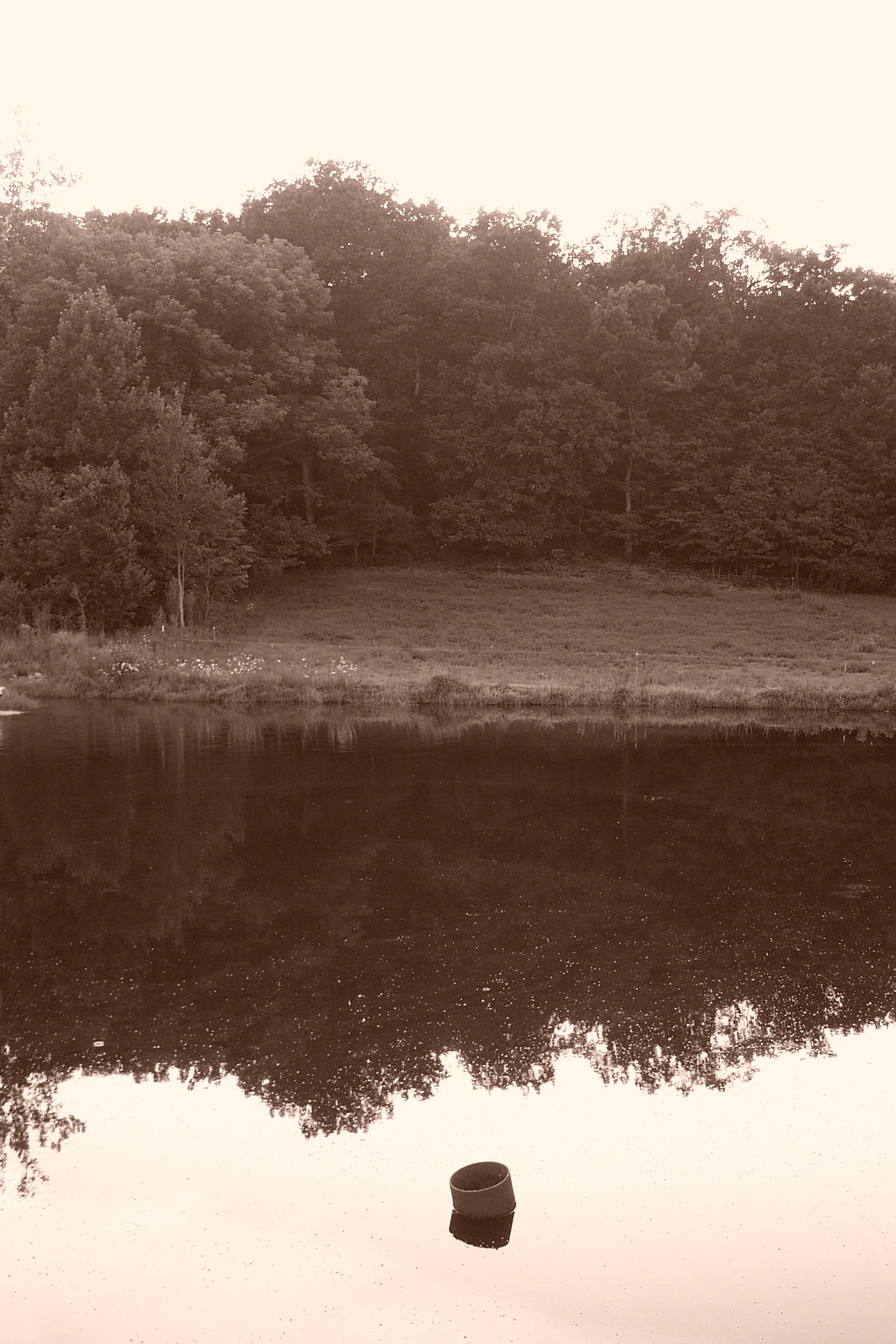
Hansbrough's Ridge is the site of the Union Encampment of 1863–1864.

Stevensburg is a small rural unincorporated community located at the intersection of Route 3 and Route 663 in Culpeper County, Virginia, United States. Stevensburg is approximately 6.9 miles east of Culpeper. Stevensburg's ZIP code is 22741. The post office is headquartered in a building approximately 10 by 15 feet, thereby making it one of the smallest post offices in America. Floriculture is a prominent industry, as several large, commercial greenhouses are in operation here.

== History ==
In about 1742, Salubria, a large brick Georgian manor house, was built about one half mile southeast of the village now known as Stevensburg. Salubria was the birthplace of Admiral Cary Travers Grayson, personal physician to President Woodrow Wilson. In October 2000, Salubria was donated by the Grayson family to the Germanna Foundation for historic preservation.

Stevensburg was originally called York by the Quakers that lived in the area. In 1782, the community was named Stevensburg in honor of General Edward Stevens, a revolutionary war hero from Culpeper. During this time period, travelers often camped in the small ravines in the area, known as "bottoms." One ravine, ½ mile east of the village on the south side of present-day Route 3, gained considerable notoriety for "lewd behavior" (according to the Quakers), and came to be known as "Wicked Bottom."

During the winter of 1863 through 1864, Hansbrough's Ridge, a ridge about one mile east of the village, hosted the Union Army winter encampment.

== Notable people ==
- Benjamin S. Kelsey – military aviator
