= OGH =

OGH may refer to:

- Osmania General Hospital
- Order of the Golden Horseshoe
- Supreme Court of Justice (Austria) (German: Obersten Gerichtshof)
