= Salubria =

Historic house in Virginia, United States

- U.S. National Register of Historic Places
- Virginia Landmarks Register
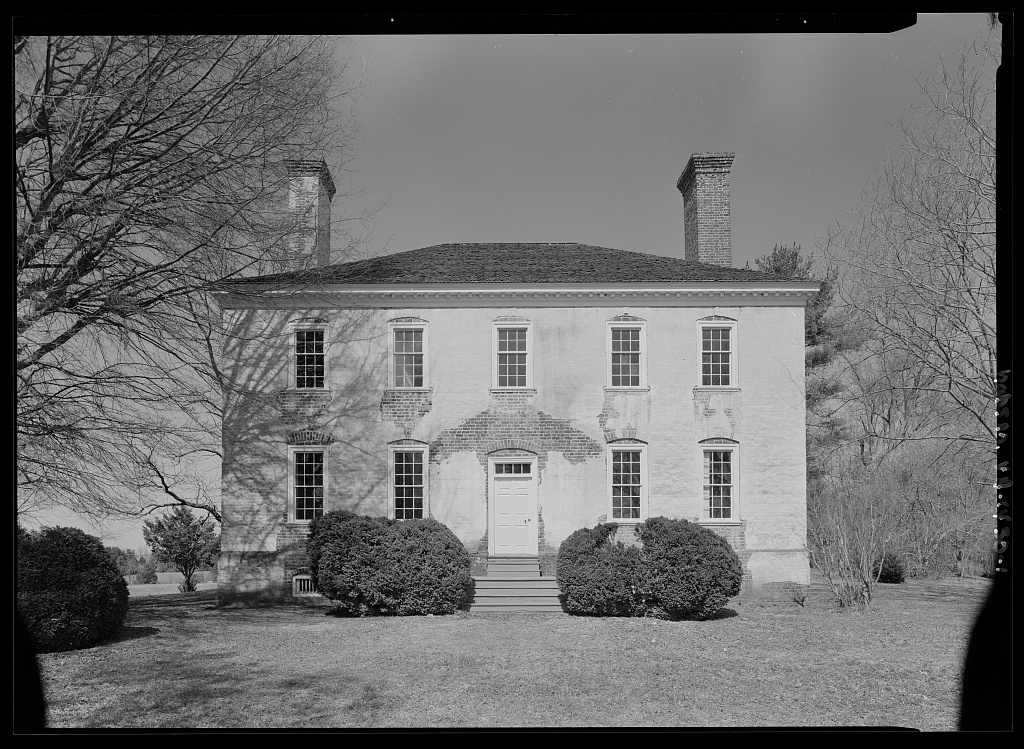
- Salubria, South Elevation

- Location within Virginia Location within the United States
- Location: E of jct. of Rtes. 3 and 663, Stevensburg, Virginia
- Coordinates: 38°26′21″N 77°53′07″W
- Area: 200 acres (81 ha)
- Built: c. 1757
- NRHP reference No.: 70000789
- VLR No.: 023-0020

Significant dates
- Added to NRHP: February 16, 1970
- Designated VLR: December 2, 1969

Salubria is a historic plantation house located at Stevensburg, Culpeper County, Virginia. It was built in 1757, and is a two-story, hipped roof dwelling with two large corbel-capped chimneys on the interior ends. Salubria was the birthplace of Admiral Cary Travers Grayson, personal physician to President Woodrow Wilson. In October 2000, Salubria was donated by the Grayson family to Historic Germanna for historic preservation.

It was listed on the National Register of Historic Places in 1970.

== Architecture ==
Salubria is an example of Georgian architecture, characterized by symmetrical design, Flemish bond brickwork, and elaborate interior woodwork. Notable features include an arched staircase entry, paneled rooms, and fireplaces framed by classical detailing. The property includes terraces for formal gardens.

== History ==
Salubria was built by Reverend John Thompson, an Anglican minister, and his wife, Butler Brayne Spotswood, the widow of Virginia Lieutenant Governor Alexander Spotswood. The house was the center of a plantation operated by enslaved laborers and craftspeople.

The property passed through the Thompson, Barbour, Hansbrough, and Grayson families. The name Salubria, meaning "healthful," came into use during the Hansbrough family’s ownership in the early nineteenth century. During the Civil War, fighting associated with the Battle of Brandy Station occurred on the property in June 1863. Union forces occupied the area and used the house as a military headquarters during the winter of 1863–1864.

== Preservation ==
Salubria and the surrounding property were designated a Virginia Historic Landmark in 1969; Salubria’s architectural features are documented through the Historic American Buildings Survey.
