= USS Grayson =

Gleaves-class destroyer

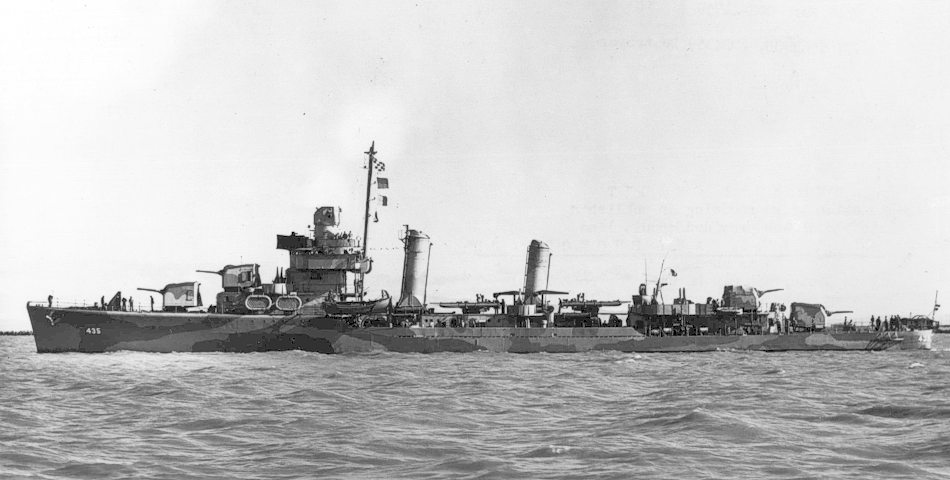
- USS Grayson (DD-435)

History

United States
- Name: Grayson
- Namesake: Cary Travers Grayson
- Builder: Charleston Navy Yard
- Laid down: 17 July 1939
- Launched: 7 August 1940
- Commissioned: 14 February 1941
- Decommissioned: 4 February 1947
- Stricken: 1 June 1972
- Fate: Sold 12 June 1974; and broken up for scrap

General characteristics
- Class & type: Gleaves-class destroyer
- Displacement: 1,630 tons
- Length: 348 ft 3 in (106.15 m)
- Beam: 36 ft 1 in (11.00 m)
- Draft: 11 ft 10 in (3.61 m)
- Propulsion: 50,000 shp (37,000 kW); 4 boilers; 2 propellers
- Speed: 37.4 knots (69 km/h)
- Range: 6,500 nmi (12,000 km; 7,500 mi) at 12 kn (22 km/h; 14 mph)
- Complement: 16 officers, 260 enlisted
- Armament: 4 × 5 in (127 mm) DP guns, 6 × 0.5 in (12.7 mm) guns, 6 × 20 mm AA guns, 10 × 21 in (533 mm) torpedo tubes, 2 × depth charge tracks

USS Grayson (DD-435), a Gleaves-class destroyer, is the only ship of the United States Navy to be named for Rear Admiral Cary Travers Grayson, who served as personal physician and aide to President Woodrow Wilson during World War I. He also served as chairman of the American Red Cross from 1935 until his death on 15 February 1938.

Grayson was laid down on 17 July 1939 by the Charleston Navy Yard, South Carolina and launched on 7 August 1940; sponsored by Mrs Alice Gertrude Gordon Grayson Harrison (Mrs George Leslie Harrison), widow of Rear Admiral Grayson. The ship was commissioned on 14 February 1941.

== Service history ==
After shakedown along the New England coast and in Chesapeake Bay, Grayson joined Destroyer Division 22 (DesDiv 22) of the Atlantic Fleet. On 28 August she became the flagship of Destroyer Squadron 11 (DesRon 11) operating in the Caribbean out of Guantanamo Bay. She reported for neutrality patrol in the North Atlantic waters between Newfoundland and Iceland on 26 October.

After ten months patrolling and escorting convoys in the North Atlantic, Grayson was ordered to the Pacific to join an American fleet battered but resolutely carrying the war to the enemy. She sailed from San Diego on 2 April 1942 as part of aircraft carrier Hornet's escort and rendezvoused at sea 13 April with Enterprise under Admiral William F. Halsey, Jr. From this fast carrier group, less than 800 miles from the Japanese home islands, General Jimmy Doolittle launched a B-25 raid on Tokyo on 18 April.

The task group sailed into Pearl Harbor on 25 April. Grayson departed almost immediately for repairs in California, before returning to the Pacific war.

=== Guadalcanal ===
Grayson sailed from Pearl Harbor 15 July to escort Enterprise and Hornet. Reaching Guadalcanal via Tongatapu on 7 August 1942, the carriers launched their aircraft to cover the landings there and then operated in the area to block Japanese reinforcements. As they manoeuvred off Guadalcanal, Enterprise was hit by Japanese bombs on 24 August in an action lasting half an hour which saw Grayson claim two Japanese aircraft and damage a third. The task group then dispersed, with Enterprise returning to Pearl Harbor for repairs. Grayson joined Task Force 11 (TF 11), built around Saratoga under Admiral Frank Jack Fletcher. On 25 August, Grayson sighted a Japanese submarine on the surface the next day and after expending her entire supply of 46 depth charges, in five attacks, the destroyer saw air bubbles and oil rise to the surface.

She remained around Guadalcanal escorting troop transports, patrolling in "The Slot" and served as a radar picket ship. On 18 October she picked up 75 survivors from the destroyer Meredith, which had been sunk by an aerial torpedo on 16 October, and helped escort the barge Vireo.

=== Kolombangara ===
Returning to Pearl Harbor on 15 April 1943 for overhaul, Grayson continued on to the United States for further repairs and then made to New Caledonia, arriving 24 September. She claimed four and two possible Japanese barges from Kolombangara between 30 September – 3 October, with DesRon 21. Then after three months of patrols, sailed for Puget Sound Navy Yard 16 December for overhaul.

=== 1944 ===
Grayson returned to the Pacific, putting in at Majuro Atoll, Marshall Islands, 10 February 1944. Patrol duty in the Solomons, Carolines, and Marshalls occupied her the following six months. On 30 March she supported the initial landings on Pityilu Island, Admiralties, from 22 to 24 April she was a fighter-director ship for the landings at Tanahmerah Bay, Dutch New Guinea. On 27 May, she shelled Biak Island and Noemfoor Island on 2 July, prior to the invasion landings.

On 1 September 1944 Grayson joined TG 38, for airstrikes on the Palau Islands, scene of the next major invasion. She returned to Seeadler Harbor on 30 September. She sailed 2 October supporting airstrikes strike against Okinawa and the Philippines and on 15 October she rescued 194 men from the damaged cruiser Houston.

From Ulithi, Grayson sailed to Saipan, where on 3 November she took up radar picket and lifeguard duty. Finally Grayson was ordered home, reaching Seattle on 9 June 1945.

=== End of World War II and fate ===
Grayson returned to Pearl Harbor 1 September 1945, the day of the signing of the Articles of Surrender in Tokyo Bay. After a brief training period, she sailed for the United States, transiting the Panama Canal 8 October, she put in at Charleston, South Carolina, 16 October. Eleven days later she hosted over 5,000 visitors on Navy Day. Grayson remained at Charleston until decommissioned, 4 February 1947, and was placed in reserve. She was struck from the Naval Vessel Register in 1972, sold 12 June 1974 and broken up for scrap.

Grayson received 13 battle stars for World War II service.
