= Swift Run Gap =

- Interactive map of Swift Run Gap
- Elevation: 2,365 ft (721 m)
- Traversed by: US 33

Location
- Location: Greene / Rockingham counties, Virginia, United States
- Range: Blue Ridge Mountains
- Coordinates: 38°21′25″N 78°32′42″W

Swift Run Gap is a wind gap in the Blue Ridge Mountains located in the U.S. state of Virginia.

== Geography ==
At an elevation of 2,365 feet (721 m), it is the site of the mountain crossing of U.S. Highway 33 between the Piedmont region on the eastern side and the Shenandoah Valley (or Great Valley of Virginia) to the west.

Generally following the mountain ridge tops, the Skyline Drive, which is part of Shenandoah National Park, has an entry point at Swift Run Gap, and the Appalachian Trail also passes through nearby. The mountain ridge forms the border between Greene County and Rockingham County. Swift Run Gap lies along a drainage divide between southeast-flowing streams in the James River watershed and northwest-flowing streams that drain to the Shenandoah River system.

== Geology ==
The bedrock beneath Swift Run Gap is 1.05-billion-year-old granitic rocks of the Blue Ridge basement complex. The type location for the Swift Run Formation, a Neoproterozoic metasedimentary unit, is approximately 1.5 miles (2.4 km) east of the gap. A steeply dipping, northwest-striking transverse fault cuts through Swift Run Gap, and differential erosion of the fractured bedrock along this fault may be responsible for the development of a gap at this location.

== History ==
Swift Run Gap is a long-used and historic crossing in the Blue Ridge Mountains. In 1716, Royal Governor Alexander Spotswood of the Virginia Colony, with 62 other men and 74 horses, led a real estate speculation expedition up the Rapidan River valley during westward exploration of the interior of Virginia. The party reached the top of the Blue Ridge at Swift Run Gap on September 5, 1716. Upon descending into a portion of the Shenandoah Valley on the east side of Massanutten Mountain, they reached a point near the current town of Elkton, where they celebrated their arrival on the banks of the Shenandoah River with multiple volleys and special toasts of brandy and claret to the King and the Governor, naming a peak for each.

After the journey, Spotswood gave each member of the expedition a pin made of gold and shaped like a horseshoe on which he had inscribed the words in Latin "Sic jurat transcendere montes", which translates in English to "Thus he swears to cross the mountains." The members of Governor Spotswood's expedition soon became popularly known as the "Knights of the Golden Horseshoe." A historical plaque and pyramid-shaped stone mark their historic crossing of 1716.

The Swift Run Gap Turnpike, a privately owned toll road, was first completed through Swift Run Gap in the early 19th century. In the 1840s, plans for the Louisa Railroad (renamed the Virginia Central Railroad in 1850) originally anticipated crossing the Blue Ridge at Swift Run Gap to reach Harrisonburg, but projected construction costs after surveying were prohibitive. This was primarily due to the steepness of the terrain on the eastern slope. Addressing the dilemma, Claudius Crozet, the legendary Chief Engineer of the Virginia Board of Public Works, determined that a system of tunnels at Rockfish Gap, about 30 miles (48 km) to the south, would be more feasible. Despite later technological advances, no railroad crossing was ever attempted at Swift Run Gap.

Today the two-lane U.S. Route 33 at the lower elevations follows a small creek named Swift Run west from Stanardsville, but then about halfway up, requires multiple horseshoe curves on the steep grades of the eastern slope, as it ascends an increasingly winding pathway to reach Swift Run Gap.

Major General Francis H. Smith was the first Superintendent, 1839–1889, and first part-time Commandant (VMI commandants were part-time until 1907) of the new Virginia Military Institute VMI. Thomas Jonathan Jackson, a US Military Academy Graduate, later to become well known by his nickname of Stonewall Jackson, joined the VMI faculty in 1851. Jackson's intimate knowledge of this and other crossings of the Blue Ridge facilitated his tactics and enabled him to intimidate Union leaders such as General George B. McClellan into being less aggressive with their own plans of advancement in the first years of the American Civil War (1861–1865). Jackson and his famous "foot cavalry" used Swift Run Gap (among others) to shift his troops rapidly from the Shenandoah Valley theater to the Piedmont, which allowed him to appear unexpectedly before Union forces on several occasions.
