= Germanna =

Archaeological site in Virginia, United States

- Germanna Site
- U.S. National Register of Historic Places
- Virginia Landmarks Register
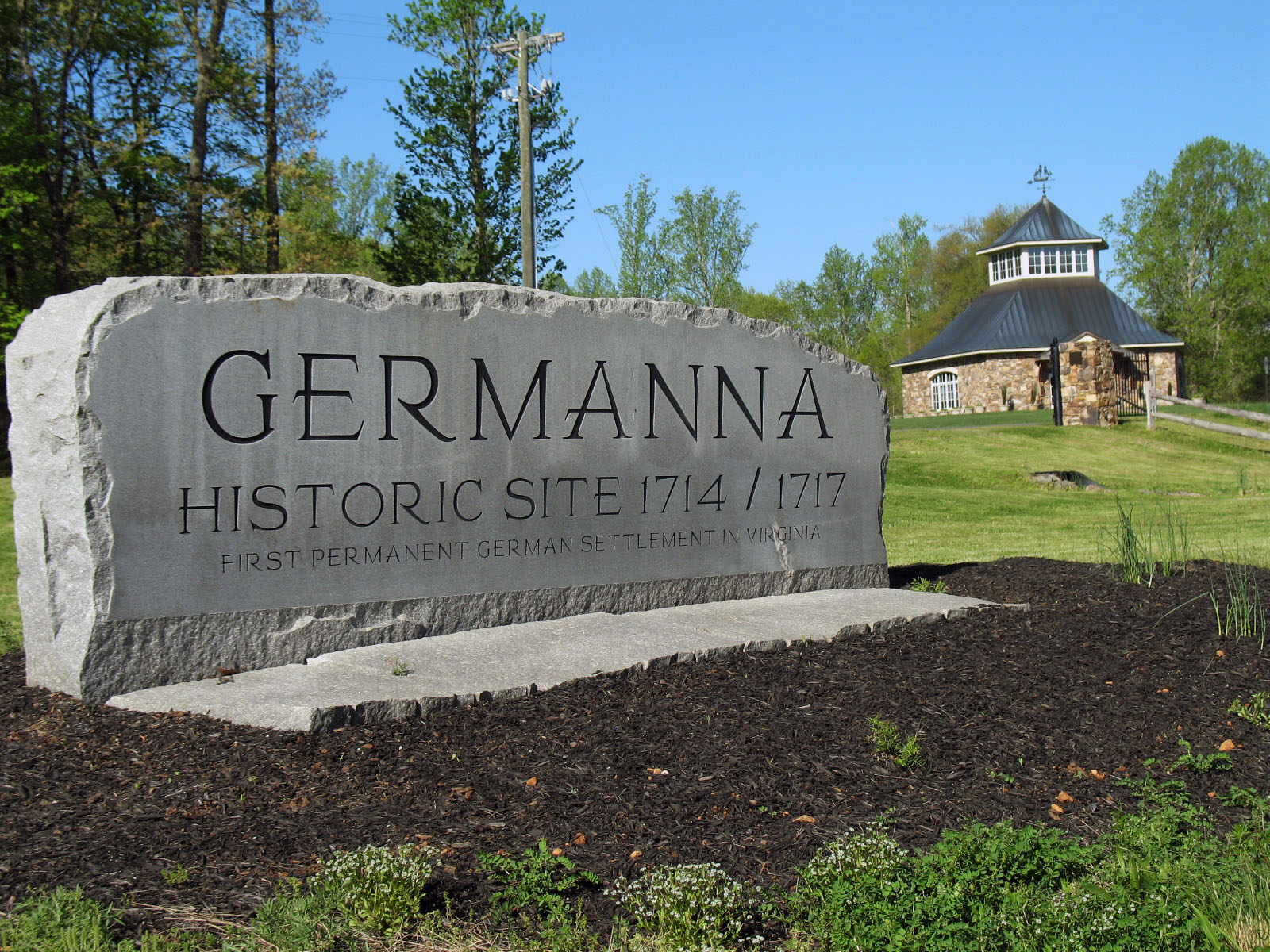
- Sign at the Germanna Visitor Center

- Location within Virginia Location within the United States
- Nearest city: Culpeper, Virginia
- Coordinates: 38.378117°N 77.783185°W
- Area: 120 acres (49 ha)
- Built: 1714
- NRHP reference No.: 78003036
- VLR No.: 068-0043

Significant dates
- Added to NRHP: August 24, 1978
- Designated VLR: June 21, 1977

Germanna was a German settlement in the Colony of Virginia, settled in two waves, first in 1714 and then in 1717. Virginia Lieutenant Governor Alexander Spotswood encouraged the immigration by advertising in Germany for miners to move to Virginia and establish a mining industry in the colony.

== Etymology ==
The name "Germanna", selected by Spotswood, reflected both the German immigrants who sailed across the Atlantic to Virginia and the British Queen Anne who was in power at the time of the first settlement at Germanna. Though she died only months after the Germans arrived, her name continues to be a part of the area.

== History ==
As part of a series of land grants awarded to settlers to create a buffer against the French, the Privy Council granted Spotswood 86,000 acres (350 km^{2}) in the newly created Spotsylvania County in 1720, of which the Germanna tract was the first, while he was lieutenant governor and actual executive head of the Virginia government. He served in this capacity between 1710 and 1722 and, in 1716, he carried out his famous Knights of the Golden Horseshoe Expedition and promoted many reforms and improvements.

Spotswood was replaced as the lieutenant governor by Hugh Drysdale some time in 1722. Historians suggest his removal may have been the result of years of disharmony between himself and the council, as well as when he accepted such a large amount of land, that he showed a disregard for the Crown policy which held that no single person or family could claim more than a thousand acres of Virginia land.

Spotswood established a colony of German immigrants on the Germanna tract in 1714, partly for frontier defense but mainly to operate his newly developed ironworks. Germanna was the seat of Spotsylvania County from 1720 to 1732. Spotswood erected a palatial home and, after the Germans moved away to Germantown, continued the ironworks with slave labor. In his later years, he served as Deputy Postmaster General for the Colonies.

The Germanna Colonies consist primarily of the First Colony of forty-two persons from the Siegerland area in Nassau-Siegen, brought to Virginia to work for Spotswood in 1714, and the Second Colony of twenty families from the Palatinate, Baden, and Württemberg area brought in 1717, but also include other German families who joined the first two colonies at later dates. Although many Germanna families later migrated southward and westward from the Piedmont region of Virginia, genealogical evidence shows that many of the families intermarried for generations, producing a rich genealogical heritage.

The site of the first settlement, Fort Germanna, is located in present-day Orange County along the banks of the Rapidan River, with subsequent settlements of Germans being established on sites in present-day Culpeper and Spotsylvania counties. Many Germanna families played roles in important events in early American history such as the American Revolution and migration west to Kentucky and beyond.

== Preservation ==
The site of Fort Germanna is mostly open fields with intervening thickets of second-growth timber. The Fort Germanna site was listed on the National Register of Historic Places in 1978. Traces of the terraces of Spotswood's mansion which came to be known as the "Enchanted Castle" are still discernible. Historic Germanna (formerly the Germanna Foundation) is conducting archaeological exploration of the Fort Germanna, Siegen Forest, and Salubria sites that it owns in Orange and Culpeper counties.

Historic Germanna owns land on the original Germanna peninsula, on both sides of the Germanna Highway, State Route 3, near the site of the original Fort Germanna, once the westernmost outpost of colonial Virginia. It operates the Brawdus Martin Fort Germanna Visitor Center on the Siegen Forest side of the Germanna Highway, 15 miles (24 km) east of Culpeper and 20 miles (32 km) west of Fredericksburg. The organization also owns a nearby 18th-century mansion, Salubria, once the home of Governor Spotswood's widow. In October 2000, Salubria was donated by the Grayson family to Historic Germanna for historic preservation. The organization maintains a research library, a memorial garden, and plans interpretive walking trails to various historic and archaeological sites. In addition, it publishes histories and genealogical books, a newsletter, offers educational programs at an annual historical conference and reunion and to the community, and offers group travel to Germany geared to the origin of the Germanna families.

== Timelines ==
=== First colony ===
The first colony consisted of the family surnames: Albrecht, Brombach/Brumback, Fischbach/Fishback, Hager, Friesenhagen, Heide/Heite/Hitt, Heimbach, Hofmann, Holzklau/Holtzclaw, Huttmann, Kemper/Camper, Cuntze/Koontz, Merdten/Martin, Otterbach/Utterback, Reinschmidt, Richter/Rector, Spielmann, Weber/Weaver

- 1710 May 18: Incorporation of the George Ritter Company in London, a joint stock company to be in business for 20 years; partners include Christoph de Graffenreid and Franz Ludwig Michel; the agent for the George Ritter Company is Johann Justus Albrecht, sent to the Siegerland to recruit miners in the Carolinas or Virginia
- 1711 August 15: Johann Justus Albrecht signs a contract with the ministers of Siegen
- 1711 September 5: Hermannus Otterbach requests permission to immigrate, first of the group
- 1712 May 12: Johann Justus Albrecht composes the Union Book for the George Ritter Company
- 1713 July 12: Pastor Knabenschuh goes to Oberfischbach to find that Pastor Haeger is gone and the schoolteacher, Hans Jacob Holtzklau "is also willing to travel away"
- 1713 July 17: Jacob Holzklau requests permission to immigrate
- 1713 July 31: Philip Fischbach/Hans Jacob Richter; Jost Cuntz request permission to immigrate
- 1713 summer: The people arrived in London
- 1714 January: They left for Virginia on an unknown ship
- 1714, late March: Spotswood first learns from Col. Nathaniel Blakiston, the agent for Virginia in London, that Germans are coming
- 1714 April: The Germans arrived in Virginia
- 1714: The first German Reformed Church congregation in America was organized by Rev. Henry Haeger, the church building would double as a defensive blockhouse
- 1716: They started operations at the silver mine
- 1718, early: They were instructed to search for iron
- 1720 May 17: Johann Justus Albrecht files statement regarding "eleven Labouring men to work in Mines or Quarries at or near Germanna and we began to work March One Thousand Seven Hundred and 15/16 and so continued until Dec. One Thousand Seven Hundred & Eighteen."
- 1718, by December: Spotswood says he spent about 60 pounds on the endeavor, so there was no iron furnace
- 1719, January to 1720: Pastor Haeger and the members of the First Colony moved to an area in Stafford County that is now in present-day Fauquier County; the three naturalized members of the group, John Fishback, John Hoffman, and Jacob Holtzclaw, secured 1805 acres for distribution to the group to be divided equally

=== Second colony ===
- 1717: Eighty-odd Germans from Wuerttemberg, Baden, and the Palatinate agree with Capt. Tarbett in London to sail to Pennsylvania on the ship Scott
- 1717/1718: Capt. Tarbett redirects the Germans to Virginia, where they become indentured servants of Lt. Gov. Spotswood
- 1719/1722: Some of the Germans who left in 1717 arrived in Virginia at a later time
- 1723/1725: Spotswood sues many of the Germans over land and labor disputes
- 1725: Most of these Germans move to the Robinson River Valley, in present-day Madison County
- 1728 1 February: Alexander Spotswood claimed headrights for 48 men, women, and children of the Second Germanna Colony.
- 1733: Johann Caspar Stöver becomes their Lutheran pastor
- 1740: The German Lutheran Church (now Hebron Lutheran Church) is built with funds raised in Germany

== Bibliography ==
- Hinke, William J. (October 1932). "The 1714 Colony of Germanna, Virginia". The Virginia Magazine of History and Biography. 40 (4): 317–327.
