= Knights of the Golden Horseshoe Expedition =

1716 expedition in Colony of Virginia

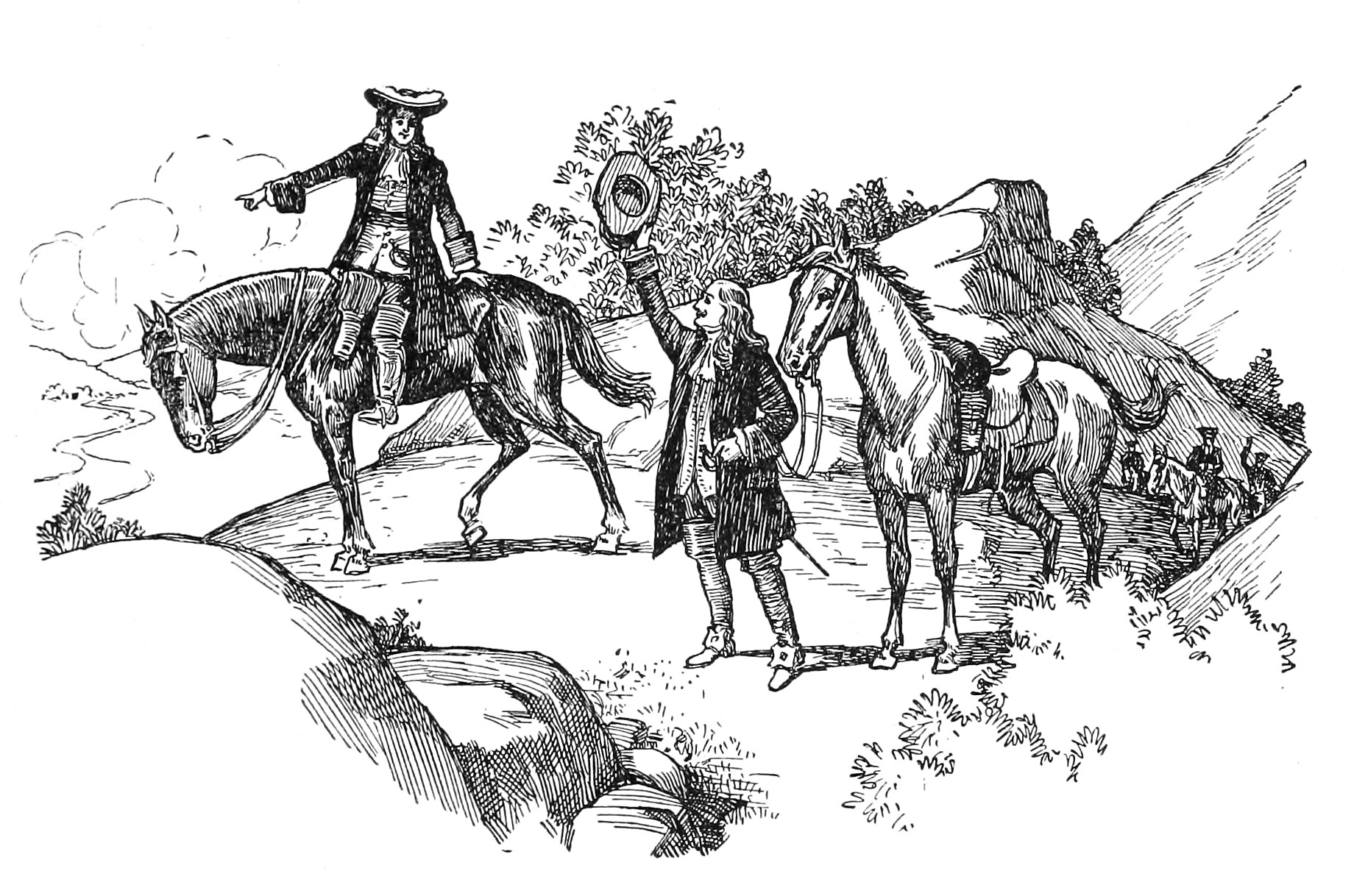
Engraving of Gov. Spotswood and the "Knights of the Golden Horseshoe" crossing the Blue Ridge Mountains

The Knights of the Golden Horseshoe Expedition, also known as the Transmontane Expedition, took place in 1716 in the British Colony of Virginia. The Royal Governor and a number of prominent citizens traveled westward, across the Blue Ridge Mountains on an exploratory expedition. It is a frequently recounted event of the History of Virginia.

== The expedition ==
Alexander Spotswood became acting royal governor of Virginia in 1710, by which time pressure on the colony to expand had become more acute than ever. In 1716, Governor Spotswood, with about 50 other men and 74 horses, led an expedition up the Rappahannock River valley (today called the Rapidan River) during westward exploration of the interior of Virginia. The journalist of this expedition was a Huguenot, Lieut. John Fontaine, who served as an officer in the British Army.

The party included fourteen rangers and four Meherrin Indians, and departed Germanna on August 29, coming within sight of the Blue Ridge Mountains on August 31. They continued upriver past today's Stanardsville, reaching the head of the Rappahannock (today's Rapidan River) on September 2. Fontaine recorded in his journal for September 5 that axemen had to clear the way along the path of what he called the "James River", but which was in fact a creek along the eastern slope named Swift Run, surrounded on all sides by steep mountain terrain. Swift Run is part of the James River drainage system. The expedition had followed the Rappahannock drainage system up to this point.

There they crossed the top ridge of the Blue Ridge mountains at Swift Run Gap (elevation 2,365 feet).

On September 6, 1716, they rode down into the Shenandoah Valley on the east side of Massanutten Mountain and reached the Shenandoah River, which they called the "Euphrates" near the current town of Elkton. There, they fired multiple volleys and drank special toasts of wine, brandy, and claret to the King and to Governor Spotswood, naming the two peaks after them. The taller summit they called "Mount George", and the lesser, "Mount Spotswood".

On the banks of the river they buried a bottle, inside which they had put a paper whereby Spotswood claimed the place in the name of George I. On September 7, the party returned home, reaching Germanna on September 10.

After the journey, Spotswood gave each officer of the expedition a stickpin made of gold and shaped like a horseshoe on which he had inscribed the words in Latin "Sic juvat transcendere montes", which translates into English as "Thus, it is pleasant to cross the mountains." The horseshoes were encrusted with small stones and were small enough to be worn from a watch chain. The members of Governor Spotswood's expedition soon became popularly known as the "Knights of the Golden Horseshoe."

Of the expedition members, only the following are known by name to have taken part: Lt. Governor Spotswood, John Fontaine, Robert Beverley, Jr., Major William Woodford, William Robertson, Dr. Robinson, Mr. Todd, James Taylor (great-grandfather of US Presidents James Madison and Zachary Taylor), Robert Brooke (grandfather of VA Governor Robert Brooke), George Mason III, Capt. Smith, William Clopton, Jr. (second son of William Clopton and Ann Booth Clopton), Jeremiah Clouder, and William Russell (Lt.-Col., Ranger, employed by Spotswood). Edward Sanders' 1839 will of descendant Elijah Sanders mentions great-grandfather "Old Edward Sanders" as a Knight of the Golden Horseshoe.

In a Richmond news article, dated February 16, 1901, honoring John Bacon Clopton, the grandson of William Clopton, Jr.. The following is a copy of a handwritten statement, signed and sealed to be found among the John Bacon Clopton papers at Duke University Library, Durham, North Carolina:

There was in my father's possession a golden horseshoe which the tradition of the family said was worn by William Clopton Jr.. That it had 7 Diamonds set in it the place of nailheads, was inscribed on one side "Sic Juvat Trancsenderi Montes" and on the other "William Clopton, Knight." That as a child I have had it laid in my hand to look at and that it was of a size to encircle the center of my palm. And that this horseshoe was stolen by Pickpocket Smith, a notorious character, who operated among fashionable of Richmond in 1842 or 3. Witness my hand and seal this ninth day of August, 1897. Signed: Joyce Wilkinson Wallace

== Legacy ==
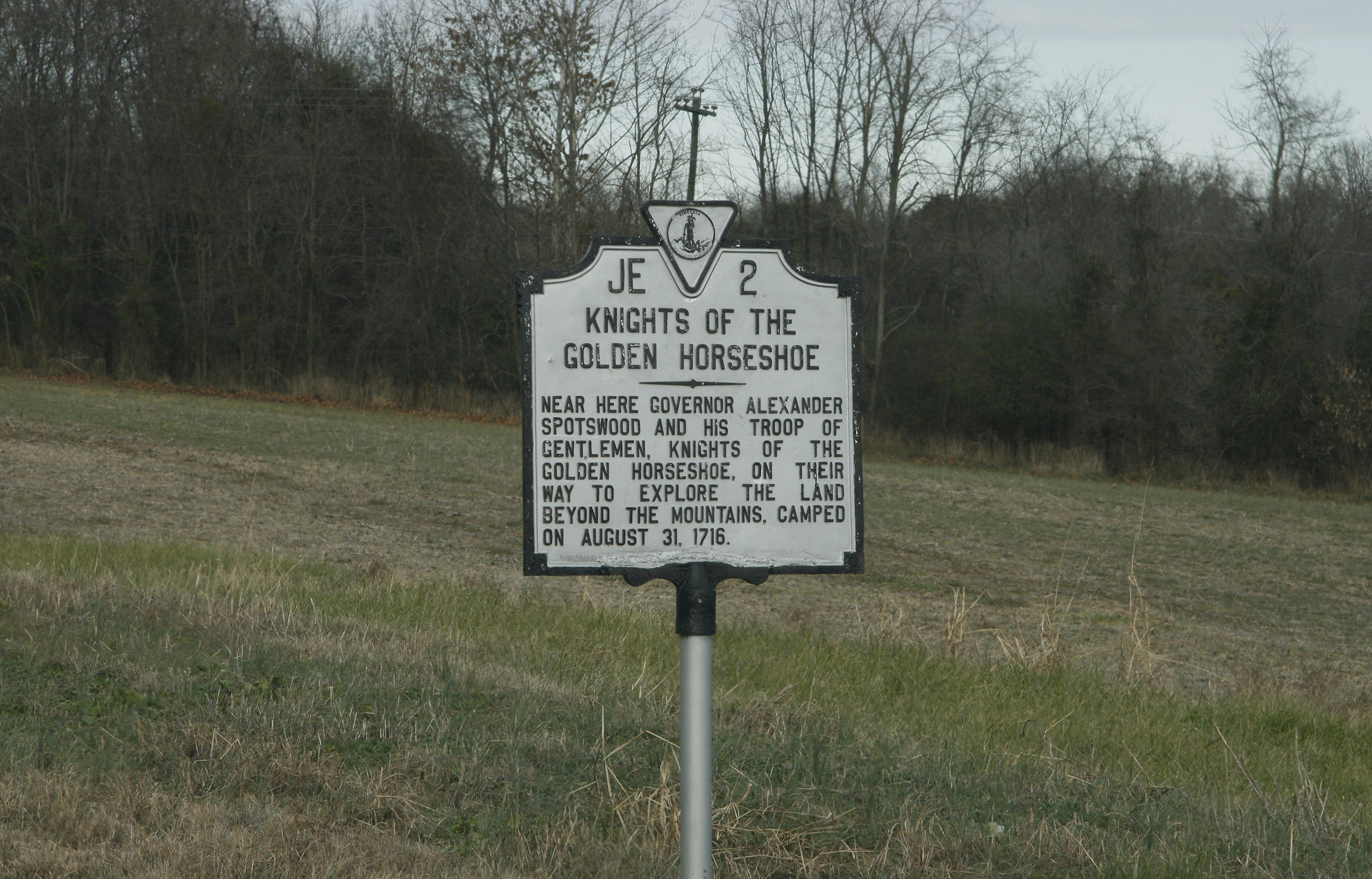
Campsite of the expedition

When Spotswood returned to Williamsburg, he actually claimed that the intention of the Expedition was to look for a way to Lake Erie, with a view to eventually thwarting the growing French presence in the region. He also sought permission from Britain to make a second expedition to scout for an outpost location on the Great Lakes; however he never received it.

At a practical level, word of the expedition, and descriptions of the fertile valley land beyond the mountain range, apparently did not do much in the short-term to open the Shenandoah Valley for development from the east. The mountain range was a formidable barrier. Instead, most of the early settlers came down the Valley from the north, many of German and Scottish descent. Groups of Mennonites migrated from Pennsylvania, and settled in the general area of present-day Rockingham County and Harrisonburg, where their descendants may still be found today.

Spotswood's expedition, which from all reports, traveled at a leisurely pace, encountered no conflict with Native Americans, and included frequent stops for celebrations and libations, earned a somewhat legendary status. The expedition's fame can also be attributed to providing further evidence supporting Virginians' self-image as being hospitable and loving of drink and conviviality. The fame was further enhanced when it was romanticized in The Knights of the Golden Horse-Shoe, an early chivalric romance, authored by William Alexander Caruthers, and first published in 1845. Today, the horseshoe and pentagon are symbols of the Germanna Foundation, which supports archaeology on the site associated with the expedition.

== Historic marker ==
A commemorative plaque and pyramid-shaped stone at Swift Run Gap (at the south side of U.S. Highway 33 near the Skyline Drive overpass) mark the historic crossing of the Knights of the Golden Horseshoe. The Skyline Drive and the Appalachian Trail both pass nearby as well.

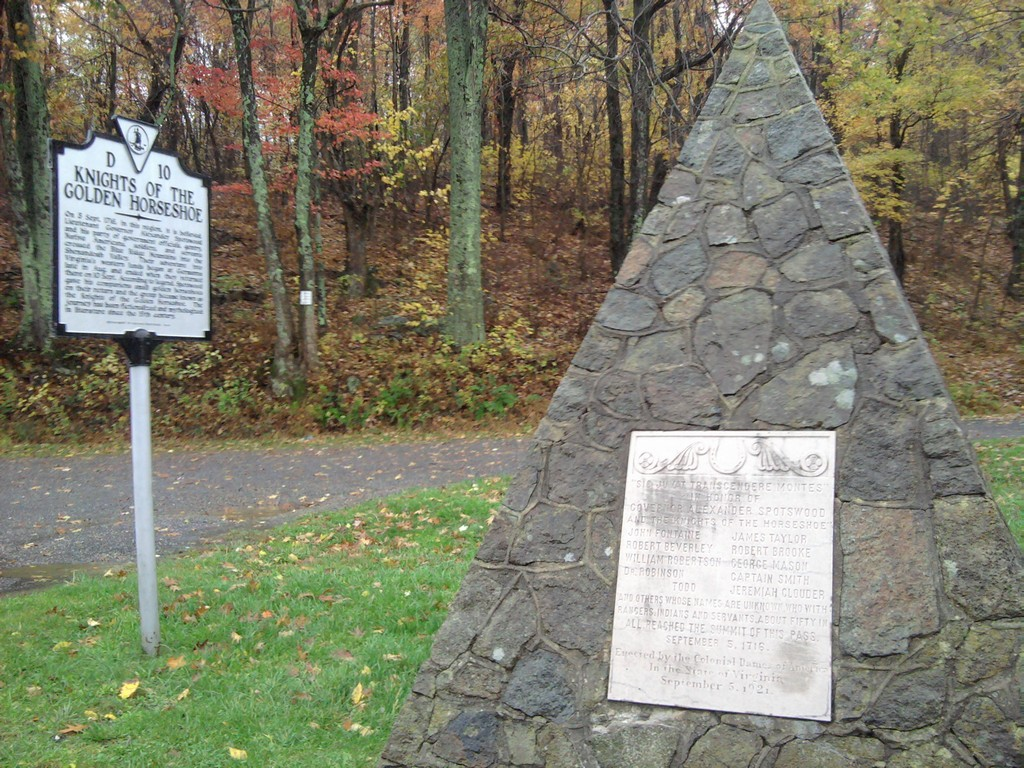

Also at this location, a Virginia Historical Highway Marker, # D10 Knights of the Golden Horseshoe, is located. It reads:

On 5 Sept. 1716, in this region, it is believed Lieutenant Governor Alexander Spotswood and his party of government officials, gentry, Native Americans, soldiers, and servants crossed the Blue Ridge Mountains into the Shenandoah Valley. Their adventure into Virginia's western lands began at Germanna late in August and ended when they returned there on 10 September. According to legend, Spotswood gave his companions small golden horseshoes on their return and the group became known as the Knights of the Golden Horseshoe. The journey has been fictionalized and mythologized in literature since the 19th century.

== Later usage of Knights of the Golden Horseshoe ==
Today, the Knights of the Golden Horseshoe are those U.S. Army soldiers from the 100th Regiment recognized by their commanders for exemplary service and leadership, just as Governor Spotswood recognized the men in his 1716 expedition. Today's Knights of the Golden Horseshoe receive a small gold-painted horseshoe. They also are approved to wear a distinctive unit insignia, featuring a golden horseshoe emblazoned on a red shield. Originally approved for the 375th Field Artillery Regiment on April 27, 1933, the insignia was redesignated for the 100th Regiment on July 8, 1960. A coat of arms also exists for regiments and separate battalions of the U.S. Army Reserve: this coat of arms features the golden horseshoe emblazoned on a red shield, the red symbolizing Artillery. Over the shield stands a Lexington Minute Man Proper.

In West Virginia, there is a competition named after the Golden Horseshoe(s), since it was previously thought that Spotswood's party had penetrated as far as the current borders of the state. The Golden Horseshoe test has been administered in West Virginia each year since 1931 and is the longest running program of its kind in the United States. The top-scoring students in each county receive the award. Each county has at least two winners. The exam tests student knowledge on West Virginia citizenship, civics and government, economics, geography, history and current events. Since 2008, all eighth grade students take a test online to show their knowledge of West Virginia's history. The students with the highest scores are knighted and receive a golden horseshoe in Charleston, West Virginia, the state capital.
