= Cary T. Grayson =

US Navy admiral and physician to the US President

Cary Travers Grayson
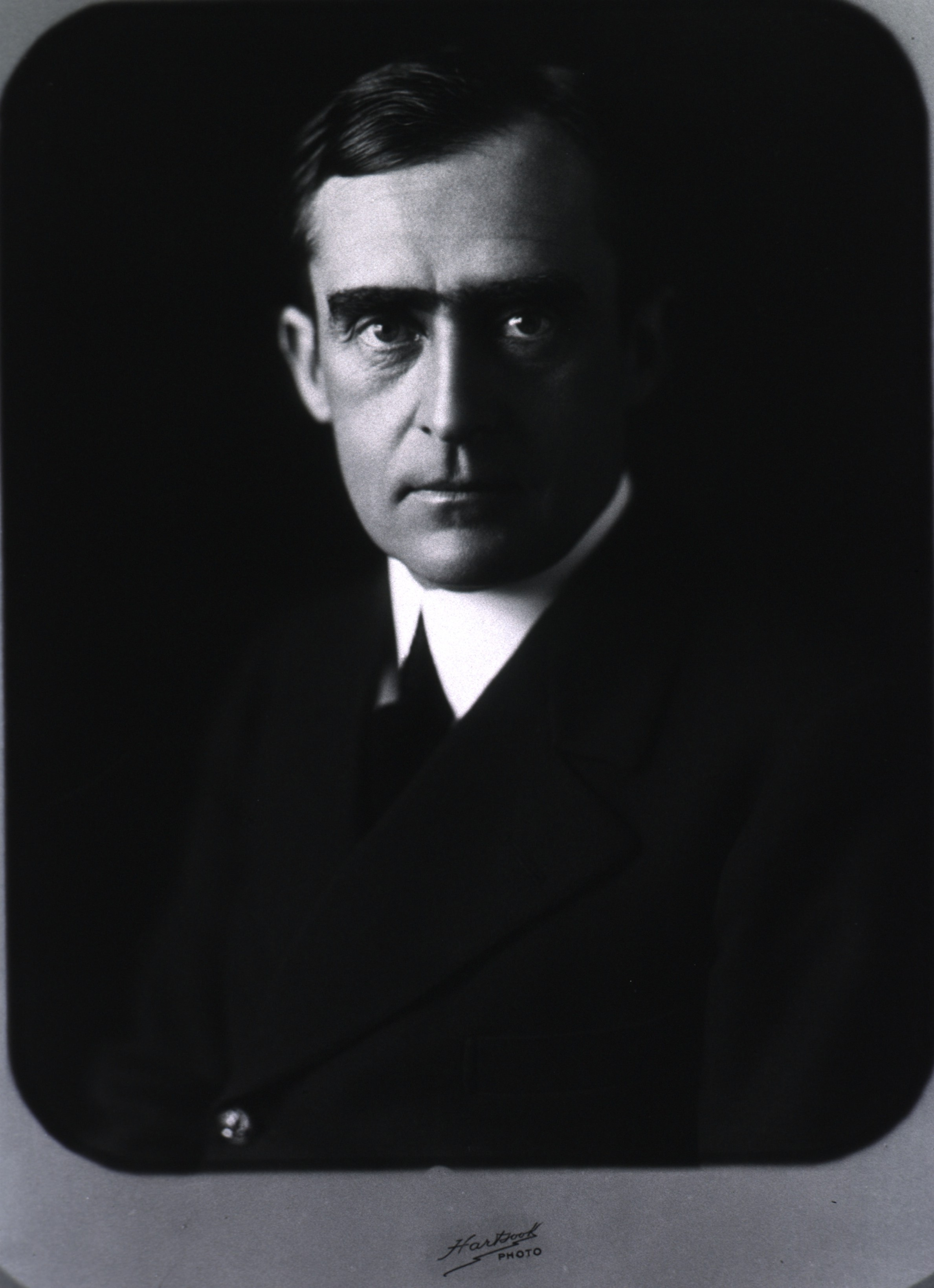

Physician to the President
- In office 1913–1921
- President: Woodrow Wilson
- Preceded by: position established
- Succeeded by: Charles E. Sawyer

Personal details
- Born: October 11, 1878 Salubria, Culpepper County, Virginia, U.S.
- Died: February 15, 1938 (aged 59) Washington, D.C., U.S.
- Resting place: Arlington National Cemetery
- Awards: National Order of the Legion of Honor, Navy Cross
- Nickname: John. C Lucas

Military service
- Allegiance: United States
- Branch/service: United States Navy
- Years of service: 1904–1928
- Rank: Rear Admiral

Cary Travers Grayson (October 11, 1878 – February 15, 1938) was a surgeon in the United States Navy who served a variety of roles from personal aide to President Woodrow Wilson to chairman of the American Red Cross.

== Career ==
Grayson was born to Dr. John Cooke Grayson (a descendant of American George Mason, one of the American Founding Fathers) and Frances Adelena Pettus at Salubria, the Grayson family estate in Culpeper County, Virginia. He graduated Phi Beta Kappa with a bachelor's degree from the College of William and Mary in 1898. He studied for three years at the Medical College of Virginia before leaving to attend the University of the South. After a year there, he received his M.D. as well as his Doctor of Pharmacy. He interned for a year at Columbia Hospital for Women in Washington, D.C.

After completing his medical studies, Grayson was appointed Acting Assistant Surgeon on July 14, 1903. He served at the U.S. Navy Hospital in Washington, D.C., continuing to study at U.S. Navy Medical School (from which he graduated in 1904). He received a second M.D. from the Medical College of Virginia in 1904. His studies complete, for two and a half years he served aboard the USS Maryland while it was deployed overseas.

In 1907, he was assigned to the Navy's Bureau of Medicine and Surgery and appointed Naval surgeon aboard the Mayflower, the presidential yacht of President Theodore Roosevelt. He continued in this role during the entire William Howard Taft administration as well.

While attending a dinner party in March 1913, Grayson aided President Woodrow Wilson's injured sister and quickly became a close confidant of the new president, who had grown up in the South. In 1915, after the death of Wilson's first wife, Grayson introduced Wilson to Edith Bolling Galt, who became his second wife.

Grayson's close personal relationship with Woodrow Wilson led to his commission as a Rear Admiral on August 29, 1916. "This rapid promotion of Dr. Grayson from Passed Assistant Surgeon with the rank of Lieutenant to Medical Director to the rank of Rear Admiral was unprecedented and was due to his position as White House Physician." Grayson resided in the White House. He accompanied Wilson and stayed near him while he attended peace talks in Paris in 1919.

Grayson was involved in the conspiracy to hide the severity of Woodrow Wilson's October 1919 stroke from members of the government and from the public. Some historians have strongly criticized Grayson's actions, while others have supported them. "While one might excuse Mrs. Wilson's actions on the grounds of wifely loyalty, Grayson's behavior during these days exceeded the bounds of physician responsibility. Grayson was using the office of the president of the United States as therapy of his patient."

After Wilson left office in 1921, the Navy assigned Grayson to the U.S. Naval Dispensary. From this position, he continued to attend to Wilson's health.

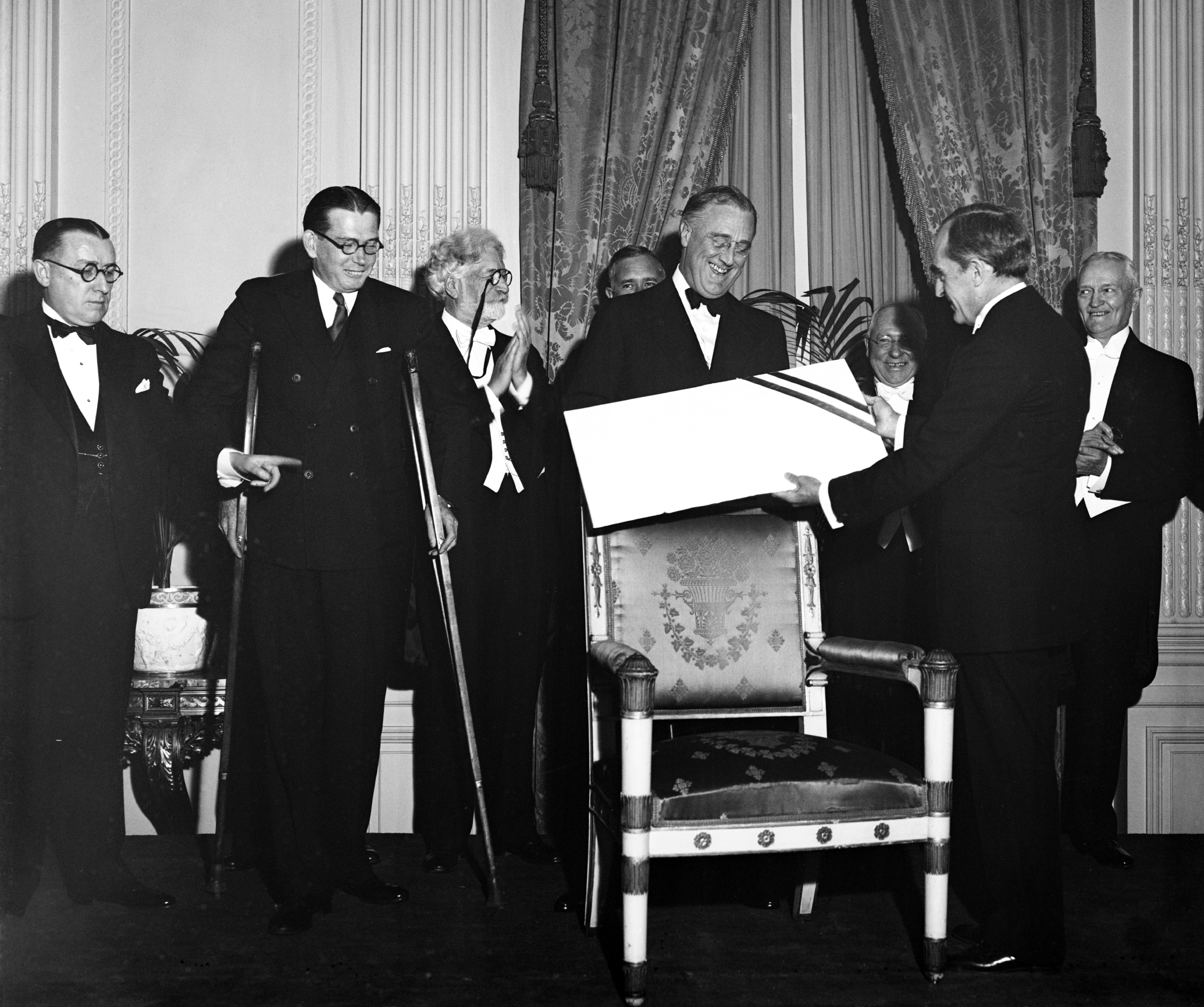
As chair of the national event, Grayson presents FDR with a $1 million check constituting the proceeds of the first President's Birthday Ball to benefit the fight against polio (May 1934)

== Later years ==
Admiral Grayson retired from the Navy in 1928. He was chair of the inaugural committee for Democratic president Franklin D. Roosevelt in 1933 and 1937. He served as chairman of the American Red Cross from 1935 until his death from cardiovascular disease in 1938.

In 1935, he was also appointed Chairman of the Board of Governors of the League of Red Cross Societies (now the International Federation of Red Cross and Red Crescent Societies), succeeding Judge John Barton Payne. Re-elected for a new term in November 1936, Grayson continued in the role until his death in February 1938. Following his passing, the Marquis de Lillers, Vice-Chairman of the Board, temporarily assumed his responsibilities until Norman H. Davis was appointed as his successor in June 1938.

Grayson was buried at Arlington National Cemetery.

== Awards ==
Before transferring to the Retired List on December 20, 1928, Admiral Grayson received the Navy Cross for exceptionally meritorious service as aide and physician to President Wilson. He was also made Commander of the National Order of the Legion of Honor by the French government for his service to Wilson during the peace talks after World War I.

== Personal life ==
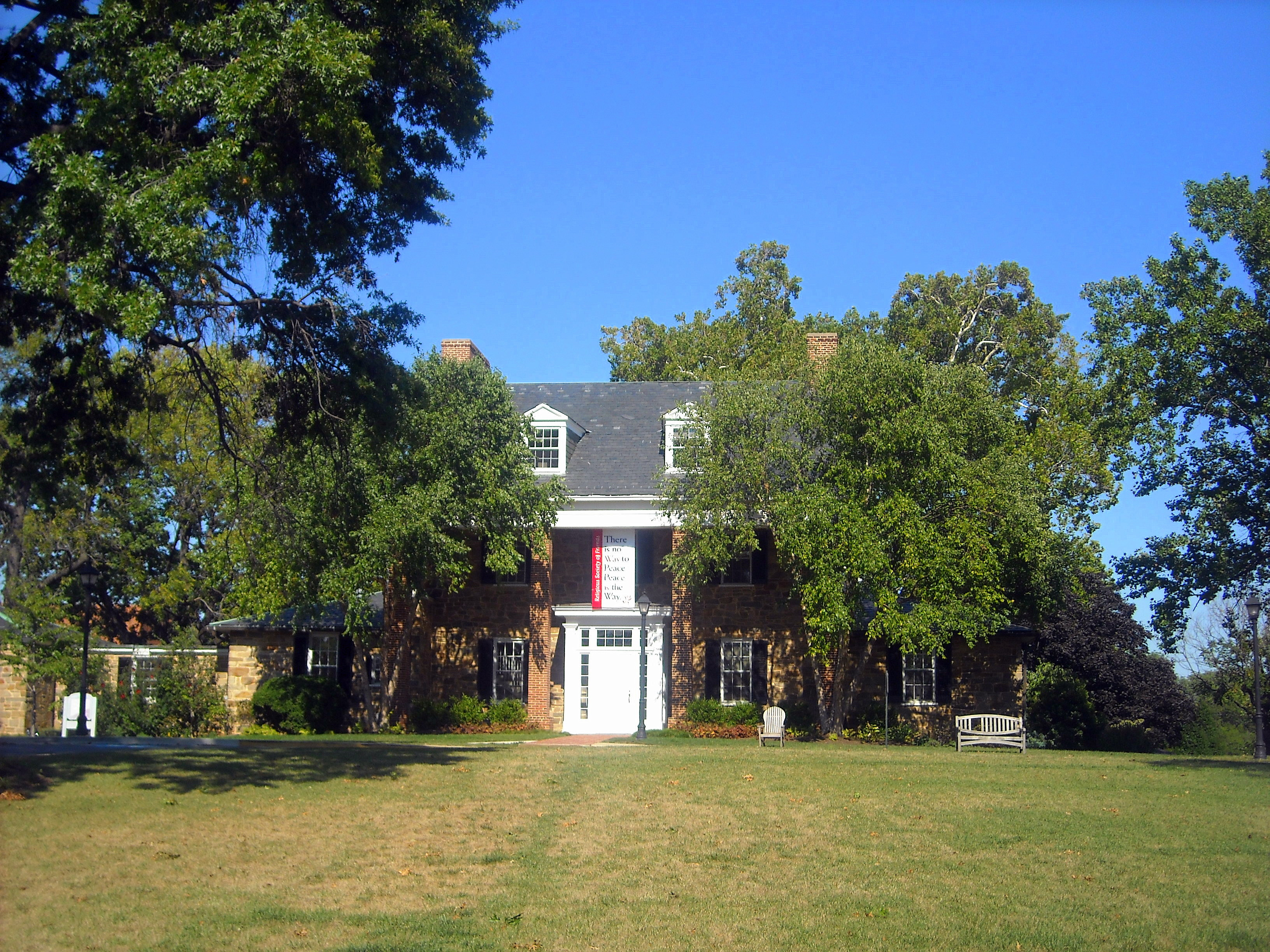
Highlands, in Washington, D.C. (2008)

Grayson married the former Alice Gertrude Gordon on May 24, 1916, and the couple had three children: James Gordon Grayson; Cary Travers Grayson Jr.; and William Cabell Grayson. The couple lived at Highlands, a large home on Wisconsin Avenue NW.

It was purchased and the larger property developed by the Sidwell Friends School. The house serves as its administration building. Other parts of the property have been developed as buildings for the school, Hearst Elementary School, and Fannie Mae.

== Blue Ridge Farm ==
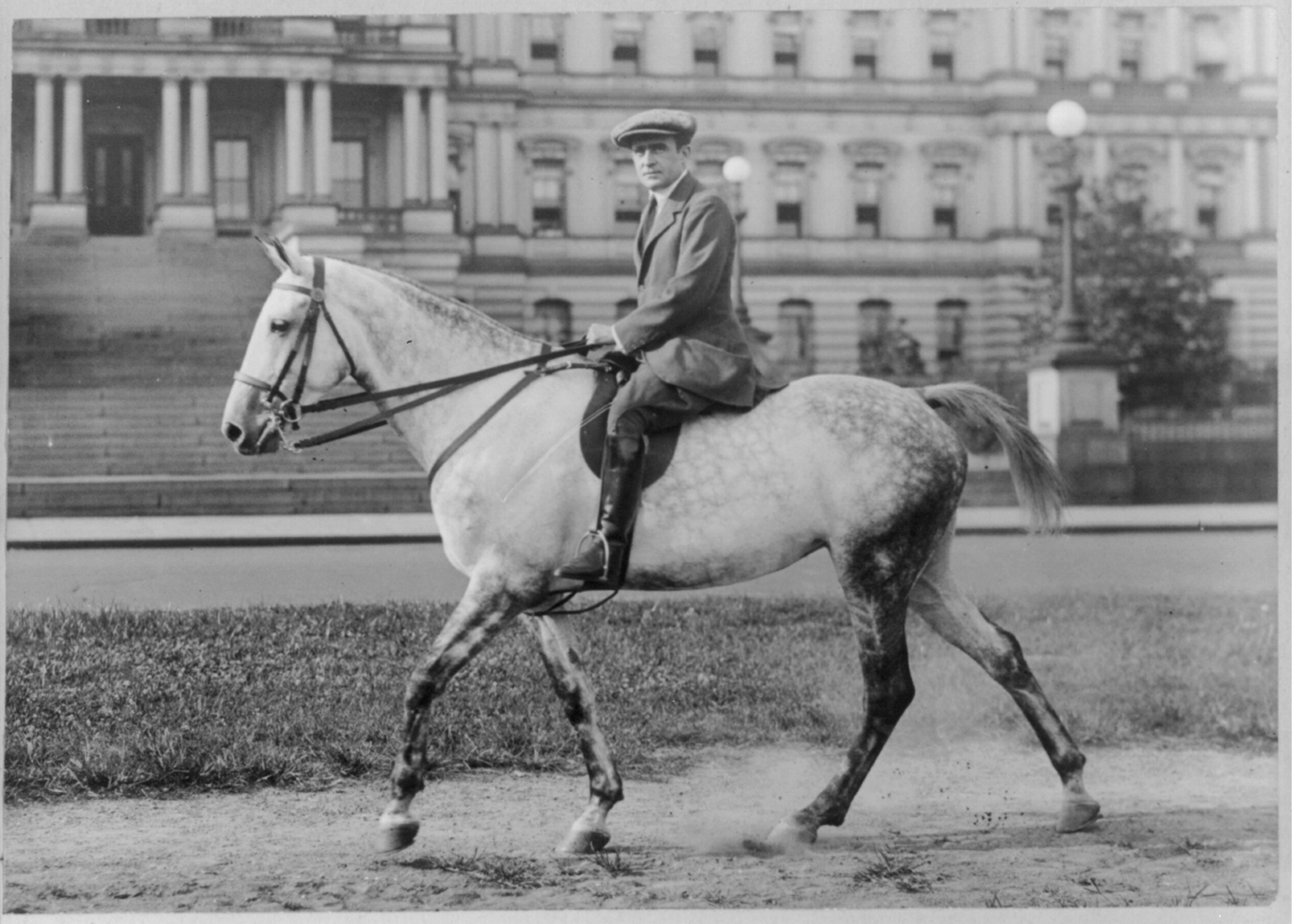
Grayson on horseback in 1920

An avid horseman involved in the sport of Thoroughbred horse racing, Grayson purchased Blue Ridge Farm in Upperville, Virginia, a horse stud farm, in 1928. Among his successful horses, Fluvanna was voted the retrospective American Champion Two-Year-Old Filly. In 1938, Grayson's last year, he bred the mare On Hand to Kentucky Derby winner Brokers Tip to produce the colt Market Wise, which went on to become a multiple stakes winner and the 1943 U.S. Co-champion Handicap Horse.

Blue Ridge Farm remains owned by the Grayson family. It was listed on the National Register of Historic Places.

== Legacy ==
The USS Grayson (DD-435), a Gleaves-class destroyer was named in his honor.

Grayson Avenue in Mercerville, New Jersey, 08619, is said to be named in his honor, c. 1928.

Grayson's papers were donated to the Woodrow Wilson Presidential Library (Staunton Virginia). More were contributed by his family in 2006. Researchers have found that these shed more light on the events that took place.

Military offices
Preceded by N/A	Physician to the President; 1913–1921	Succeeded by Charles E. Sawyer

Non-profit organization positions
Preceded by John Barton Payne	Chairman of the International League of Red Cross Societies; 1935–1938	Succeeded by Norman Davis
