= Hugh Drysdale =

British colonial governor

Colonel Hugh Drysdale (died 22 July 1726) was a governor of colonial Virginia. He was educated at Kilkenny College and Trinity College Dublin. More officially, his title was Lieutenant Governor and Commander in Chief of the Colony and Dominion of Virginia. He served as governor from September 1722, until his death in July 1726.

Because of the relative peace and calm that marked his time as governor, comparatively little is known about him today. He is generally held to have been a just and competent leader, though some have questioned his ability to govern.

== See also ==
- Colony of Virginia
- Governor's Palace
- List of colonial governors of Virginia
- History of Virginia
