= National Register of Historic Places listings in Culpeper County, Virginia =

Location of Culpeper County in Virginia

This is a list of the National Register of Historic Places listings in Culpeper County, Virginia.

This is intended to be a complete list of the properties and districts on the National Register of Historic Places in Culpeper County, Virginia, United States. The locations of National Register properties and districts for which the latitude and longitude coordinates are included below, and may be seen in an online map.

There are 29 properties and districts listed on the National Register in the county.

This National Park Service list is complete through NPS recent listings posted March 6, 2026.

== Current listings ==
	Name on the Register	Image	Date listed	Location	City or town	Description
1	Auburn	Auburn	February 21, 2008 (#08000068)	17736 Auburn Rd. 38°30′18″N 77°55′39″W	Brandy Station	
2	Burgandine House	Burgandine House	March 7, 1997 (#97000153)	807 S. Main St. 38°28′06″N 77°59′52″W	Culpeper	
3	Clifton	Clifton	September 17, 2008 (#08000911)	7091 Monumental Mills Rd. 38°36′29″N 78°00′21″W	Rixeyville	
4	Croftburn Farm	Croftburn Farm	February 16, 2001 (#01000153)	18175 Croftburn Farm Rd. 38°27′02″N 77°58′09″W	Culpeper	
5	Culpeper Historic District	Culpeper Historic District	October 22, 1987 (#87001809)	Roughly bounded by Edmonson St., the Norfolk Southern railroad line, Stevens St., and West St. 38°28′22″N 77°59′44″W	Culpeper	
6	Culpeper Municipal Electric Plant and Waterworks	Culpeper Municipal Electric Plant and Waterworks	April 2, 2019 (#100003604)	410-414 Spring St. 38°28′09″N 78°00′14″W	Culpeper	
7	Culpeper National Cemetery	Culpeper National Cemetery	February 26, 1996 (#96000029)	305 U.S. Ave. 38°28′11″N 77°59′30″W	Culpeper	
8	Eckington School	Eckington School	February 16, 2001 (#01000154)	Junction of Blackjack and Mount Pony Rds. 38°24′14″N 77°55′26″W	Culpeper	
9	Elmwood	Elmwood	January 16, 1986 (#86000075)	U.S. Route 522, W.; also Elmwood Farm Dr., W. 38°32′44″N 78°07′01″W	Boston	Elmwood Farm Dr. represents a boundary increase of December 24, 2013, the Elmwood Farm and Browning Store
10	Fairview Cemetery	Fairview Cemetery	January 11, 2006 (#05001521)	U.S. Route 522, approximately 0.5 miles (0.80 km) west of Main St. 38°28′52″N 78°00′19″W	Culpeper	
11	Farley	Farley	May 6, 1976 (#76002100)	North of Brandy Station on Farley Rd., south of the Hazel River; 38°32′27″N 77°53′31″W	Brandy Station	
12	Graffiti House	Graffiti House	November 17, 2005 (#05001274)	19484 Brandy Rd. 38°30′09″N 77°53′27″W	Brandy Station	A field hospital during the Civil War. Many signatures and hand drawings by soldiers have been discovered on the inside walls.
13	Greenville	Greenville	March 17, 1980 (#80004184)	Northeast of Raccoon's Ford; 38°22′25″N 77°55′10″W	Raccoon's Ford	
14	Greenwood	Greenwood	November 22, 1985 (#85002914)	1931 Orange Rd. 38°27′15″N 78°00′02″W	Culpeper	
15	Hill Mansion	Hill Mansion	March 17, 1980 (#80004182)	501 East St. 38°28′13″N 77°59′42″W	Culpeper	
16	A. P. Hill Boyhood Home	A. P. Hill Boyhood Home	October 2, 1973 (#73002006)	102 N. Main St. 38°28′25″N 77°59′47″W	Culpeper	
17	Little Fork Church	Little Fork Church	November 12, 1969 (#69000234)	Junction of Oak Shade and Little Fork Church Rds. 38°36′00″N 77°57′17″W	Rixeyville	
18	Locust Grove	Locust Grove	October 10, 1985 (#85003131)	Locust Grove Ln. 38°19′02″N 78°02′42″W	Rapidan	
19	Lord Culpeper Hotel	Lord Culpeper Hotel	June 12, 2017 (#100001078)	401 S. Main St. 38°28′16″N 77°59′48″W	Culpeper	
20	Madden's Tavern	Madden's Tavern	August 16, 1984 (#84003526)	Maddens Tavern Rd. 38°25′58″N 77°49′15″W	Lignum	
21	Maple Springs	Maple Springs	December 12, 1997 (#97001510)	20509 Clover Hill Rd. 38°34′53″N 77°53′26″W	Jeffersonton	
22	Mitchells Presbyterian Church	Mitchells Presbyterian Church	May 7, 1980 (#80004183)	Mitchell Rd. 38°22′47″N 78°01′27″W	Mitchells	
23	Pitts Theatre	Pitts Theatre	May 15, 2008 (#08000420)	303-307 S. Main St. 38°28′18″N 77°59′48″W	Culpeper	
24	Rapidan Historic District	Rapidan Historic District	May 8, 1987 (#87000723)	Junction of Rapidan, Old Rapidan, and Locust Dale Rds. 38°18′46″N 78°03′57″W	Rapidan	Includes such structures as the Rapidan Passenger Depot.
25	Rose Hill	Rose Hill	August 7, 2020 (#100005428)	19202 Batna Rd. 38°26′16″N 77°54′10″W	Stevensburg	
26	Salubria	Salubria	February 16, 1970 (#70000789)	East of the junction of State Route 3 and Batna Rd. 38°26′18″N 77°53′11″W	Stevensburg	
27	Signal Hill	Signal Hill	January 21, 1999 (#98001650)	16190 Germanna Highway; 38°26′59″N 77°57′13″W	Culpeper	
28	Slaughter-Hill House	Slaughter-Hill House	March 16, 1989 (#89000203)	306 N. West St. 38°28′31″N 77°59′50″W	Culpeper	
29	South East Street Historic District	South East Street Historic District	August 27, 2009 (#09000663)	S. East, E. Asher, E. Chandler, and Page Sts., and the Culpeper National Cemetery; 38°28′09″N 77°59′46″W	Culpeper	

== See also ==
- List of National Historic Landmarks in Virginia
- National Register of Historic Places listings in Virginia
