= Clifton (Rixeyville, Virginia) =

Historic house in Virginia, United States

- U.S. National Register of Historic Places
- Virginia Landmarks Register
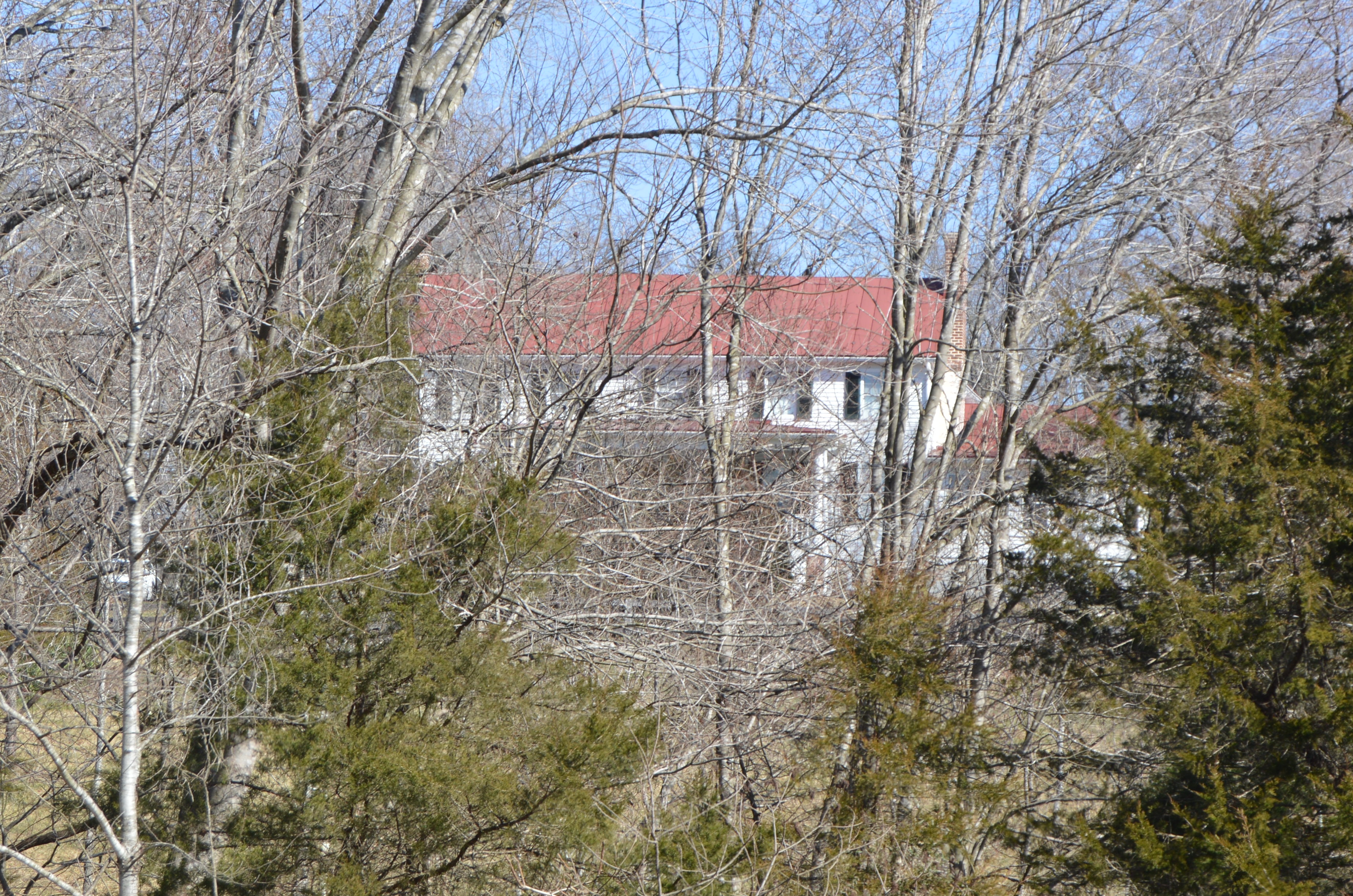
- Roadside view

- Location within Virginia Location within the United States
- Location: 7091 Monumental Mills Rd., Rixeyville, Virginia
- Coordinates: 38°36′34″N 78°00′24″W
- Area: 241 acres (98 ha)
- Built: 1845
- Architectural style: Greek Revival, Bungalow/craftsman
- NRHP reference No.: 08000911
- VLR No.: 023-5230

Significant dates
- Added to NRHP: September 17, 2008
- Designated VLR: June 19, 2008

Clifton is a historic home and farm located near Rixeyville, Culpeper County, Virginia. It was built around 1845, and is a two-story frame dwelling, built in the Greek Revival style, with wings constructed about 1850 and about 1910. Also on the property is a "street" of contributing outbuildings dated to the 19th and early 20th centuries. They include an antebellum two-story frame kitchen with a wide stone chimney; a 19th-century frame bank barn; a stone ash house, an icehouse, a chicken house, and a small frame barn, all built around 1918; a frame chicken house constructed about 1950; and a large center-aisle frame corncrib and spring house built about 1930.

It was listed on the National Register of Historic Places in 2008.
