= Madden's Tavern =

Historic commercial building in Virginia, United States

- U.S. National Register of Historic Places
- Virginia Landmarks Register
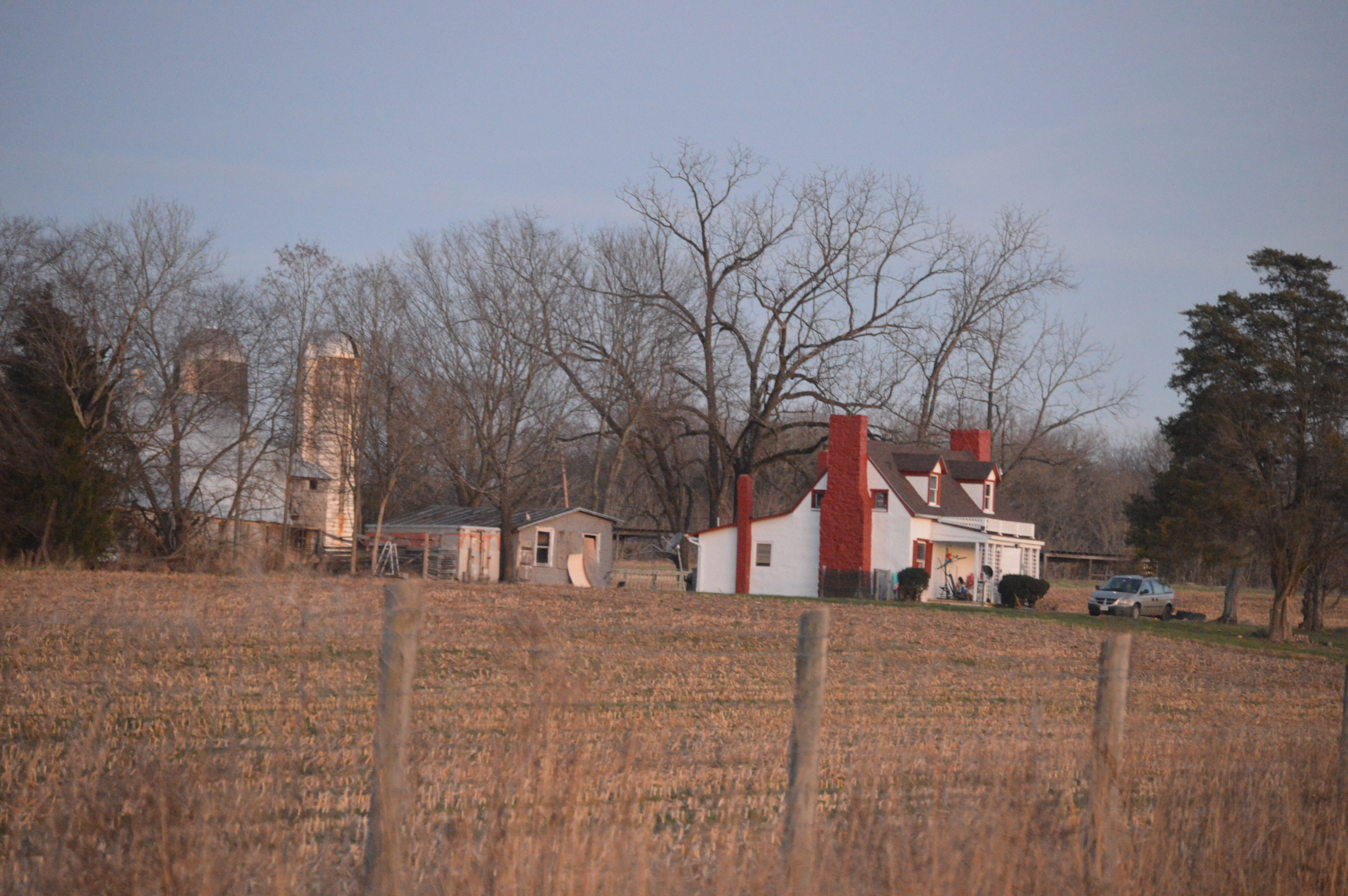
- Roadside view

- Location within Virginia Location within the United States
- Location: VA 610, nearLignum, Virginia
- Coordinates: 38°25′57″N 77°49′16″W
- Area: 3.8 acres (1.5 ha)
- Built: 1840
- NRHP reference No.: 84003526
- VLR No.: 023-0029

Significant dates
- Added to NRHP: August 16, 1984
- Designated VLR: May 15, 1984

A rare occurrence in antebellum Virginia, Madden's Tavern once functioned as a prime example of black entrepreneurship. The building was completed in 1840, and was run by a free black man named Willis Madden. Before running his own business, Madden worked a variety of trades, including a blacksmith, distiller, cobbler, teamster, farm laborer, and nail maker. Using the money and experience earned from these jobs, Madden was able to buy eighty-seven acres in Culpeper County, and set up his business at the crossroads of Old Fredericksburg Road and Peola-Mills-Kellysville Road. The business included a four-room main building, a general store, a blacksmith wheelwright shop, and several other outbuildings and shed. The western half of the tavern contained the family living quarters, and the eastern portion consisted of a downstairs public room and a loft for overnight guests. The railroad developments of the 1850s hit Madden's enterprise hard, giving the business little time to recover before it suffered extensive damage during the Civil War.

It was listed on the National Register of Historic Places in 1984.
