= Richardsville =

Richardsville may refer to:

- Richardsville, Kentucky, an unincorporated community in Warren County
- Richardsville, Pennsylvania, an unincorporated community in Jefferson County
- Richardsville, Virginia, an unincorporated community in Culpeper County

== See also ==
- Richardville (disambiguation)
