= Maple Springs =

Historic house in Virginia, United States

- U.S. National Register of Historic Places
- Virginia Landmarks Register
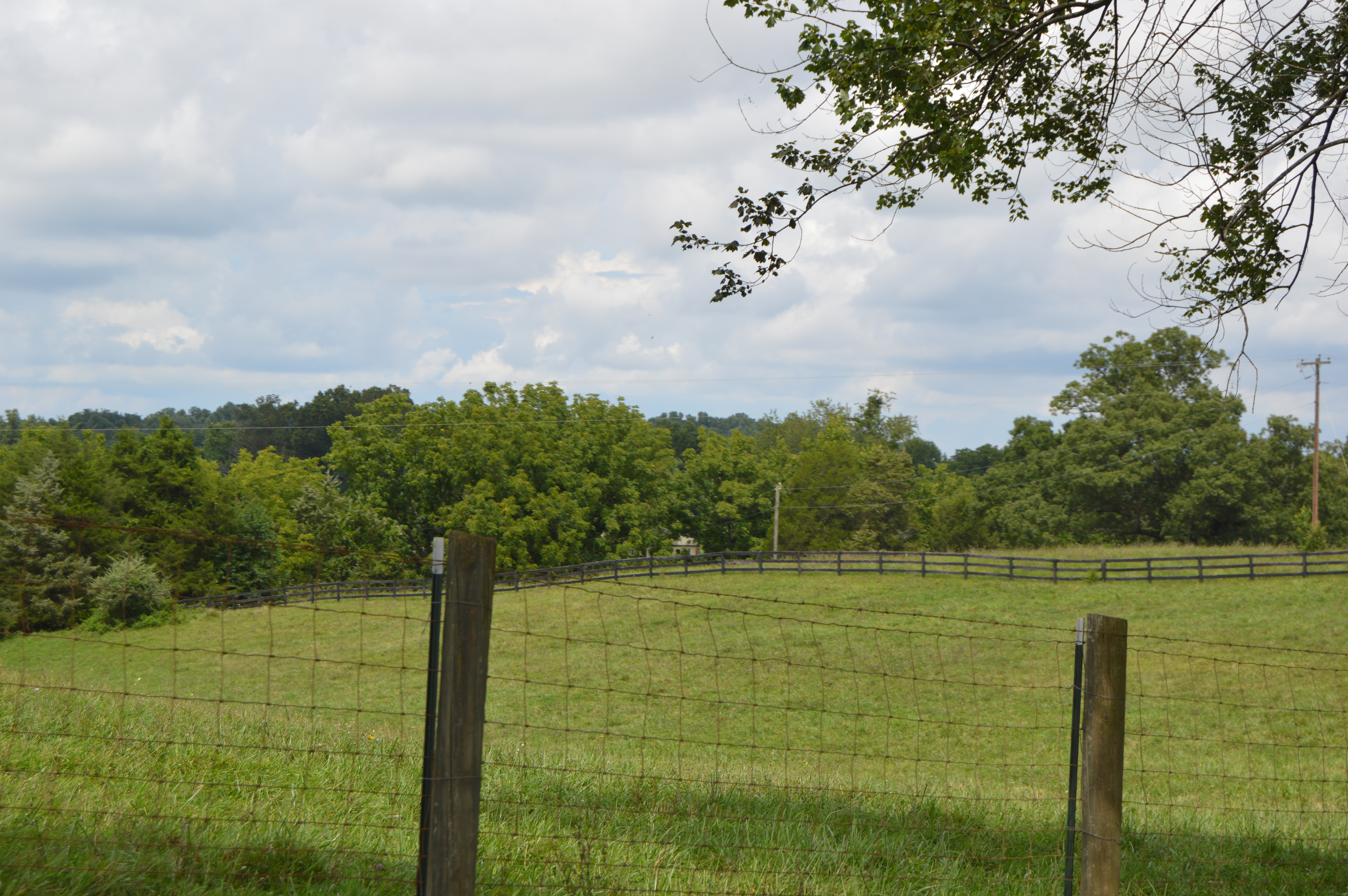
- Property entrance

- Location within Virginia Location within the United States
- Location: 20509 Clover Hill Rd., Jeffersonton, Virginia
- Coordinates: 38°34′56″N 77°53′28″W
- Area: 25 acres (10 ha)
- Built: c. 1775
- Architectural style: Georgian
- NRHP reference No.: 97001510
- VLR No.: 023-0023

Significant dates
- Added to NRHP: December 12, 1997
- Designated VLR: September 17, 1997

Maple Springs is a historic home and farm located at Jeffersonton, Culpeper County, Virginia. It was built in three sections. The first section is of heavy mortise-and-tenon frame construction; section two is of planked log construction, and appears to have been built about 1775 and joined to form a hall-parlor-plan dwelling in the mid-1800s; and section three is of lighter and cruder frame construction, was originally a detached or semi-detached unit that was joined to the house around 1900 to serve as a kitchen. It features large fieldstone chimneys on the first and second section gable ends, one with a brick stack.

It was listed on the National Register of Historic Places in 1997.
