= Hartland Institute =

Seventh-day Adventist organization

Coordinates: 38.3333°N 78.0992°W

Hartland Institute, officially Hartland Institute of Health and Education, is a self-supporting Seventh-day Adventist educational organization operated by members of the Seventh-day Adventist Church. It is located in Rapidan, Virginia, in the United States. The institution was established in 1983.

It consists of Hartland College (a Christian missionary college), a lifestyle center, a K–9 school, and a bookstore. Its lifestyle center offers natural healing techniques and hydrotherapy. Its educational training program is centered on the Bible and the counsels of Ellen White. It is also the home of the traveling singing group The Three Angels' Chorale, its touring choir. They have trimonthly convocations which include sermons and songs.

Hartland Institute's first president was Dr. Colin D. Standish (1983–2011). Key figures in its history include Colin Standish and Hal Mayer. In March 2011, Norbert Restrepo, Jr. (born 1969) assumed the role of second President of Hartland Institute. He was elected in May 2010 by the Hartland Institute Board's unanimous vote. When selected, he had been Director of Las Delicias Institute located in Armenia, Colombia, South America, for 14 years (1996–2010).

Hartland Institute also owns and operates a radio station, 89.1 FM WRLP, which is licensed to Orange, Virginia, and is an affiliate of Radio 74 Internationale.

== History ==
Hartland opened in 1983, with Hartland Publications established in 1984.

== Hartland College ==
Hartland College
- Motto: Catch the Vision
- Type: Private, Bible College
- Established: 1983
- Affiliations: Religious/Conservative
- President: Norbert Restrepo Jr
- Location: Rapidan, VA, United States
- Campus: Rural
- Website: www.hartland.edu

Hartland College is a division of Hartland Institute of Health and Education in Rapidan, Virginia, United States.

Founded in 1983 as one of the original divisions of Hartland, it claims to be an "expressly Christian missionary college" and focuses on preparing students to be conservative, religious missionaries around the world.

Hartland College offers bachelor's degrees in Christian Elementary Education, Christian Secondary Education, Health Ministry, Health Education, Christian Media Management, Christian Publications Management, Bible Instruction, and Pastoral Evangelism. In addition to academic studies, the students learn practical skills including agriculture, auto mechanics, landscaping, food preparation, and the basics of medical missionary work.

It has one main building, the mansion, which hosts its administrative and business offices, cafeteria, library, and chapel. It also has a music building where music and writing classes are taught, a media center for technology classes, and a lifestyle center at which they accept health guests and train their health students in preventive medicine.

Hartland College is not certified by the state of Virginia or accredited by any regional accrediting agency.
