= Waddell Memorial Presbyterian Church =

Historic church in Virginia, United States

- U.S. National Register of Historic Places
- U.S. Historic district – Contributing property
- Virginia Landmarks Register
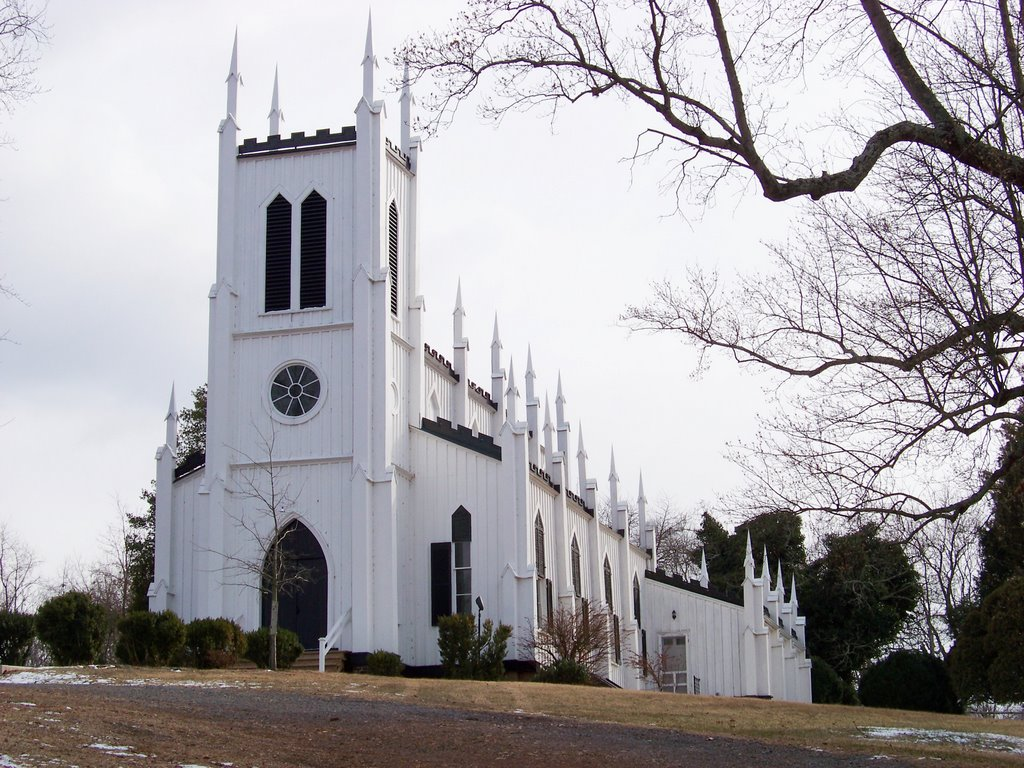

- Location within Virginia Location within the United States
- Location: SE of Rapidan on VA 615, near Rapidan, Virginia
- Coordinates: 38°18′29″N 78°3′46″W
- Area: 2 acres (0.81 ha)
- Built: 1874
- Built by: Danforth, J.B.
- Architectural style: Carpenter's Gothic
- NRHP reference No.: 75002028
- VLR No.: 068-0054

Significant dates
- Added to NRHP: August 28, 1975
- Designated VLR: June 17, 1975

Waddell Memorial Presbyterian Church is a historic Presbyterian church located near Rapidan, Orange County, Virginia. It was built in 1874, and is a Carpenter Gothic frame building covered with board-and-batten siding. It features a three-stage tower at the gable end with a ground level with an equilateral-arched doorway, a middle level with a rose window, and a belfry with double pointed windows.

It was added to the National Register of Historic Places in 1975. It is located in the Rapidan Historic District.
