= Mitchells Presbyterian Church =

Historic church in Virginia, United States

- U.S. National Register of Historic Places
- Virginia Landmarks Register
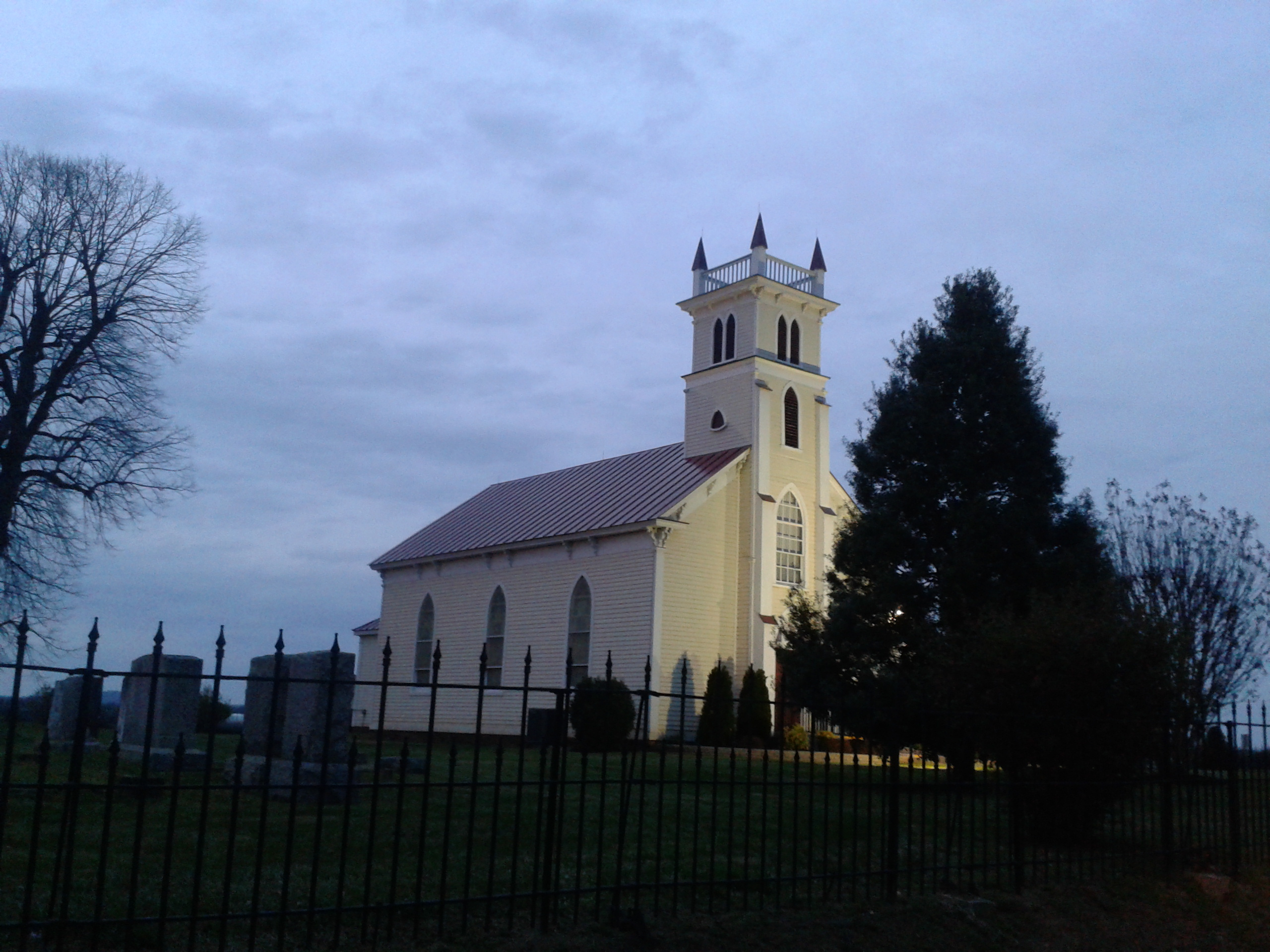
- Mitchells Presbyterian Church at dusk, April 2017

- Location within Virginia Location within the United States
- Location: VA 652, Mitchells, Virginia
- Coordinates: 38°22′46″N 78°1′27″W
- Area: 3 acres (1.2 ha)
- Built: 1879
- Architectural style: Gothic, Carpenter Gothic
- NRHP reference No.: 80004183
- VLR No.: 023-0051

Significant dates
- Added to NRHP: May 7, 1980
- Designated VLR: February 19, 1980

Mitchells Presbyterian Church is a historic Presbyterian church located on VA 652 in Mitchells, Culpeper County, Virginia. It was built in 1879, and is a one-story, frame building in the Carpenter Gothic style. It measures 50 feet by 30 feet and sits on a brick foundation. The interior features a trompe-l'œil fresco added between 1892 and 1899 by well-known local artist Joseph Oddenino. He also painted the interior murals at Elmwood.

It was listed on the National Register of Historic Places in 1980.
