= Signal Hill (Culpeper, Virginia) =

Historic house in Virginia, United States

- U.S. National Register of Historic Places
- Virginia Landmarks Register
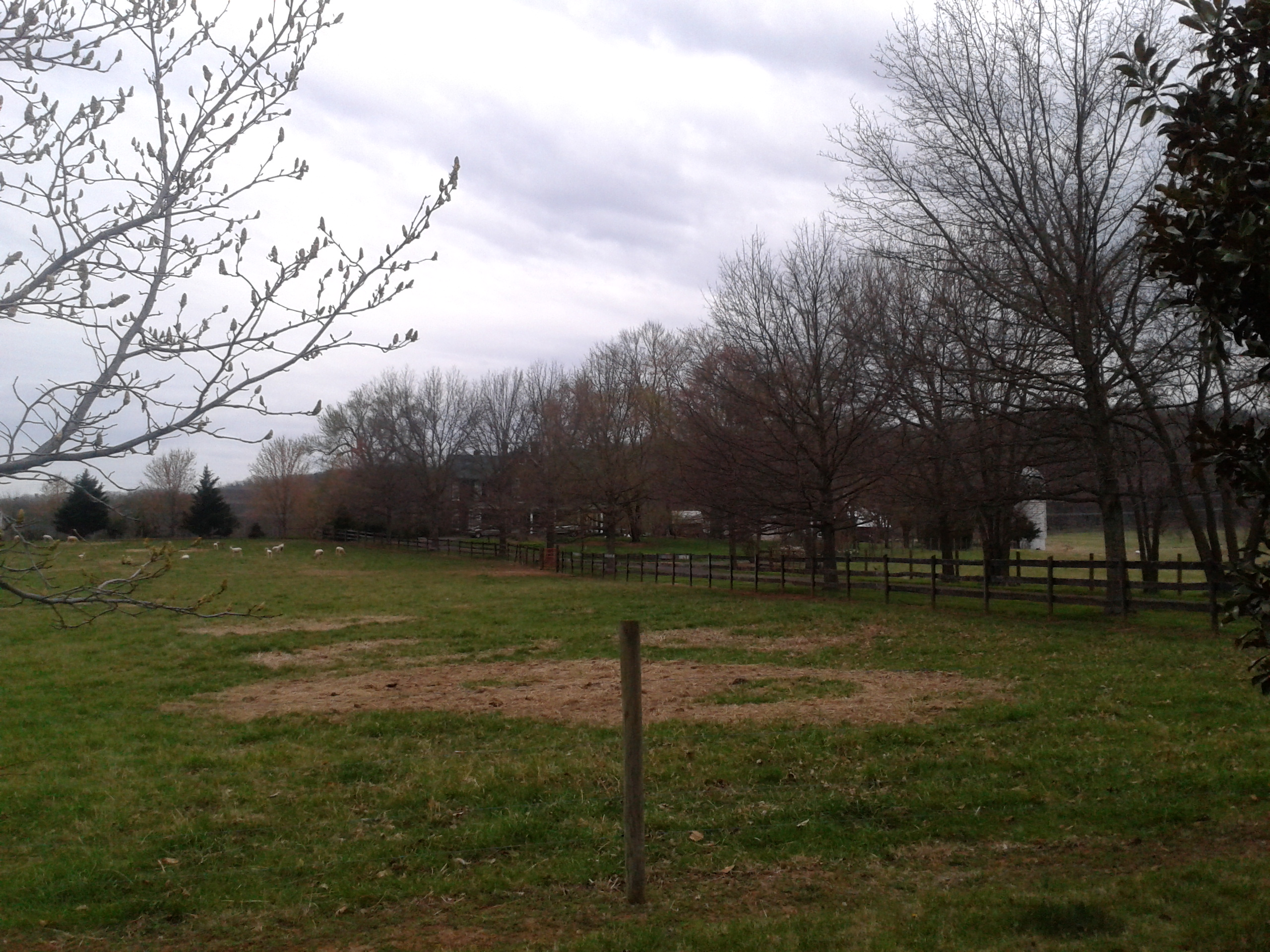
- House and grounds at dusk, April 2017

- Location within Virginia Location within the United States
- Location: 16190 Germanna Hwy., Culpeper, Virginia
- Coordinates: 38°26′59″N 77°57′13″W
- Area: 40 acres (16 ha)
- Built: c. 1900
- Architectural style: Late Victorian
- NRHP reference No.: 98001650
- VLR No.: 023-5023

Significant dates
- Added to NRHP: January 21, 1999
- Designated VLR: December 10, 1998

Signal Hill is a historic home and farm complex located at Culpeper, Culpeper County, Virginia. The farmhouse was built about 1900, and is a two-story, asymmetrically cruciform brick house, in a refined, late-Victorian style. It features a one-story, 13-bay, wraparound porch with a hipped roof. Also on the property are the following contributing elements: three gable-roofed frame barns, two concrete silos, two frame gable-roof sheds, and a small gable-roof pump house.

It was listed on the National Register of Historic Places in 1999.
