= Rapidan station =

Coordinates: 38°18′47.8″N 78°3′55.1″W

- Rapidan Passenger Depot
- U.S. Historic district – Contributing property
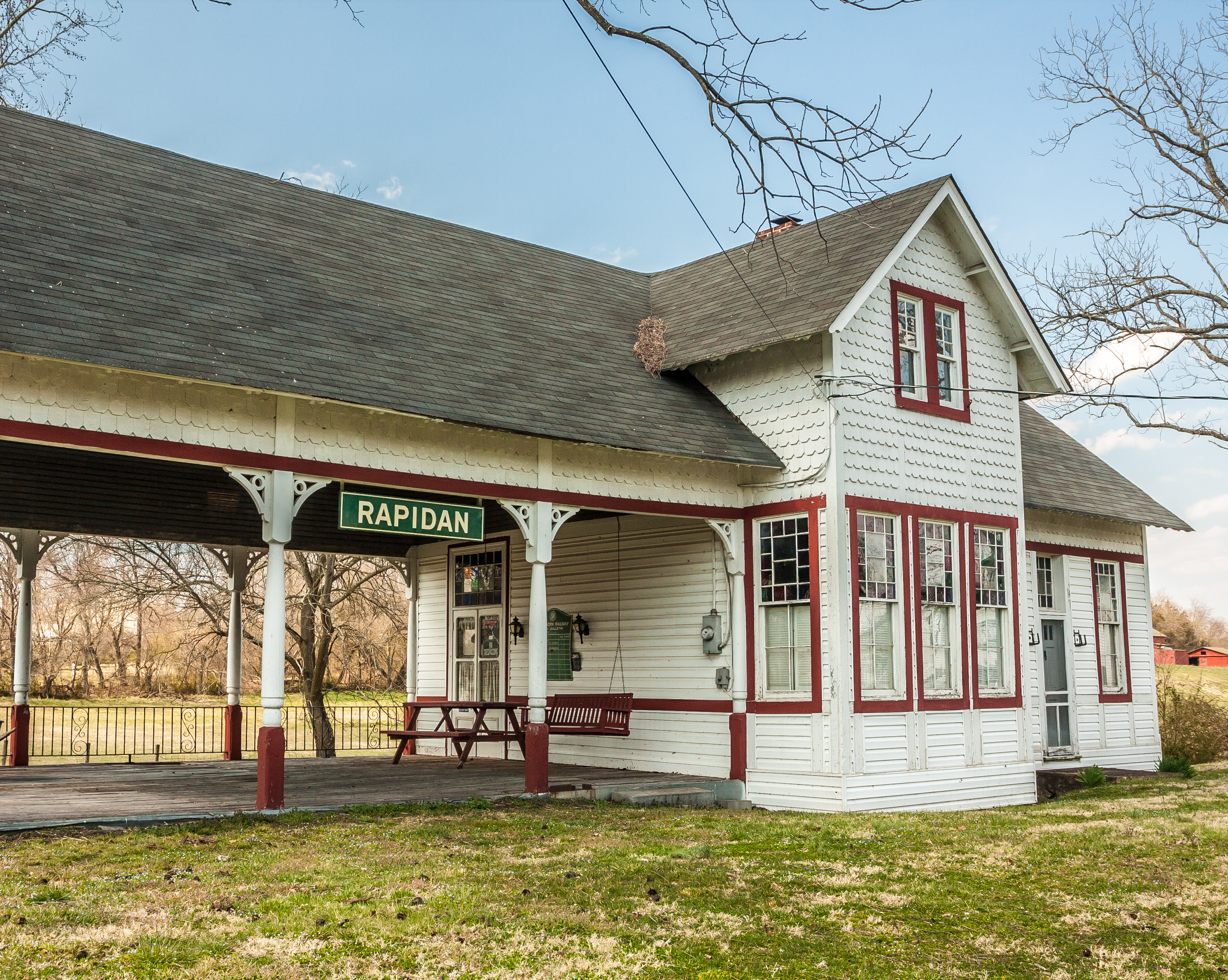
- The former Rapidan Passenger Depot in March 2013

- Location within Virginia Location within the United States
- Location: Rapidan, VA
- Built: 1876
- Part of: Rapidan Historic District (ID87000723)
- Added to NRHP: May 8, 1987

The Rapidan Passenger Depot is located at the junction of VA 614, VA 615, and VA 673 in Rapidan, Virginia, United States.

== History ==
In January 1848, three petitions were submitted to the Virginia General Assembly from businessmen in Culpeper County for incorporation of an "Orange and Alexandria Railroad Company". In March 1848, the Virginia General Assembly chartered the Orange and Alexandria Railroad Company. Its charter specified that it was to run from Gordonsville through Culpeper Court House to Alexandria.

The town in which the station lies began in the small milling community known as Waugh's Ford. With the coming of the Orange and Alexandria Railroad in 1854, the settlement was renamed Rapid Ann Station, reflecting the customary name of the river (a fast-moving stream named for Princess Ann).

In January 1854, the railroad reached the Rapidan River and a station was established. A post office was opened at "Rapid Ann Station". In April 1863, W.H.F. Lee's Confederate cavalry burnt the Rapidan River Bridge. In September 1864, the federal cavalry burnt facilities at Mitchell and Rapidan Stations. In 1876, the Charlottesville & Rapidan RR was incorporated to construct a direct line between Orange and Charlottesville. The line was eventually merged into the Southern Railway and today serves as Norfolk Southern's mainline between the two cities. The original line between Orange and Gordonsville was leased to the Chesapeake and Ohio Railroad. The current Passenger Depot was constructed. In 1880, the Charlottesville and Rapidan Railroad was opened (Gordonsville by-pass). In 1886, the village and the station was renamed Rapidan. Today the station is part of the Rapidan Historic District.

Preceding station	Southern Railway	Following station
Orange toward Birmingham	Main Line	Mitchell toward Washington, D.C.
