= Elmwood (Culpeper, Virginia) =

Historic house in Virginia, United States

- U.S. National Register of Historic Places
- Virginia Landmarks Register
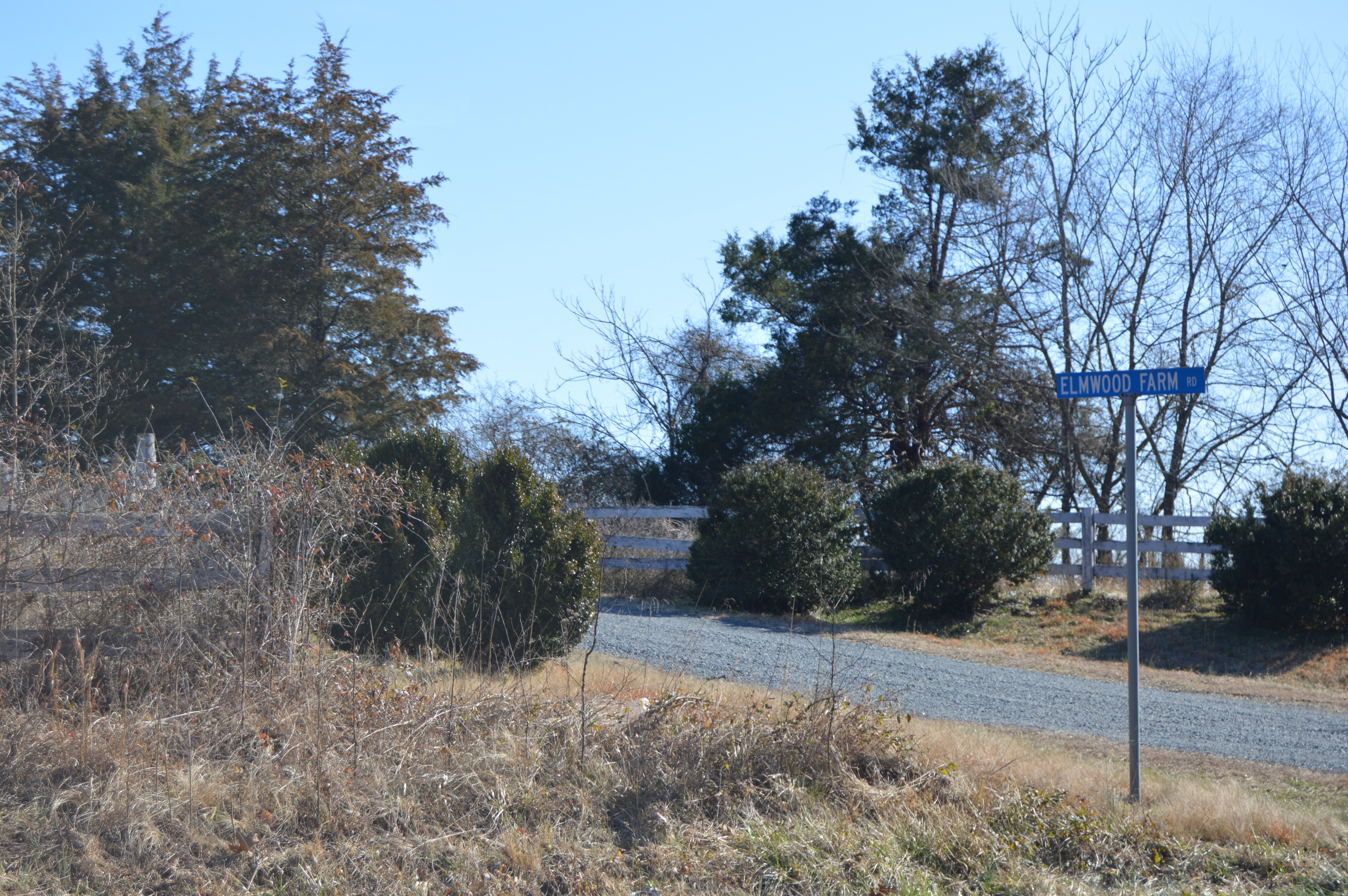
- Property entrance

- Location within Virginia Location within the United States
- Location: US 522 W, Culpeper, Virginia
- Coordinates: 38°32′44″N 78°7′2″W
- Area: 0.2 acres (0.081 ha)
- Built: c. 1870-1874
- Built by: Joseph Oddenino
- Architectural style: Italianate
- NRHP reference No.: 86000075
- VLR No.: 023-0044

Significant dates
- Added to NRHP: January 16, 1986
- Designated VLR: June 8, 1985

Elmwood is a historic home located at Culpeper, Culpeper County, Virginia. It was built between 1870 and 1874, and is a three-story, double-pile brick dwelling in the Italianate style. It has a central hall plan with a central hall stairway. Also on the property are the contributing outdoor kitchen and smokehouse. The interior features well-preserved interior mural paintings by the well-known local artist, Joseph Oddenino. Oddenino also created the interior of the Mitchells Presbyterian Church.

It was listed on the National Register of Historic Places in 1986. In 2013, the boundaries of the listing were increased to include 5 acres (2.0 ha) of the surrounding farm and several contributing buildings. One of the buildings included is the Browning Store, a store, home and post office built circa 1773.
