= Lord Culpeper Hotel =

Historic commercial building in Virginia, United States

- U.S. National Register of Historic Places
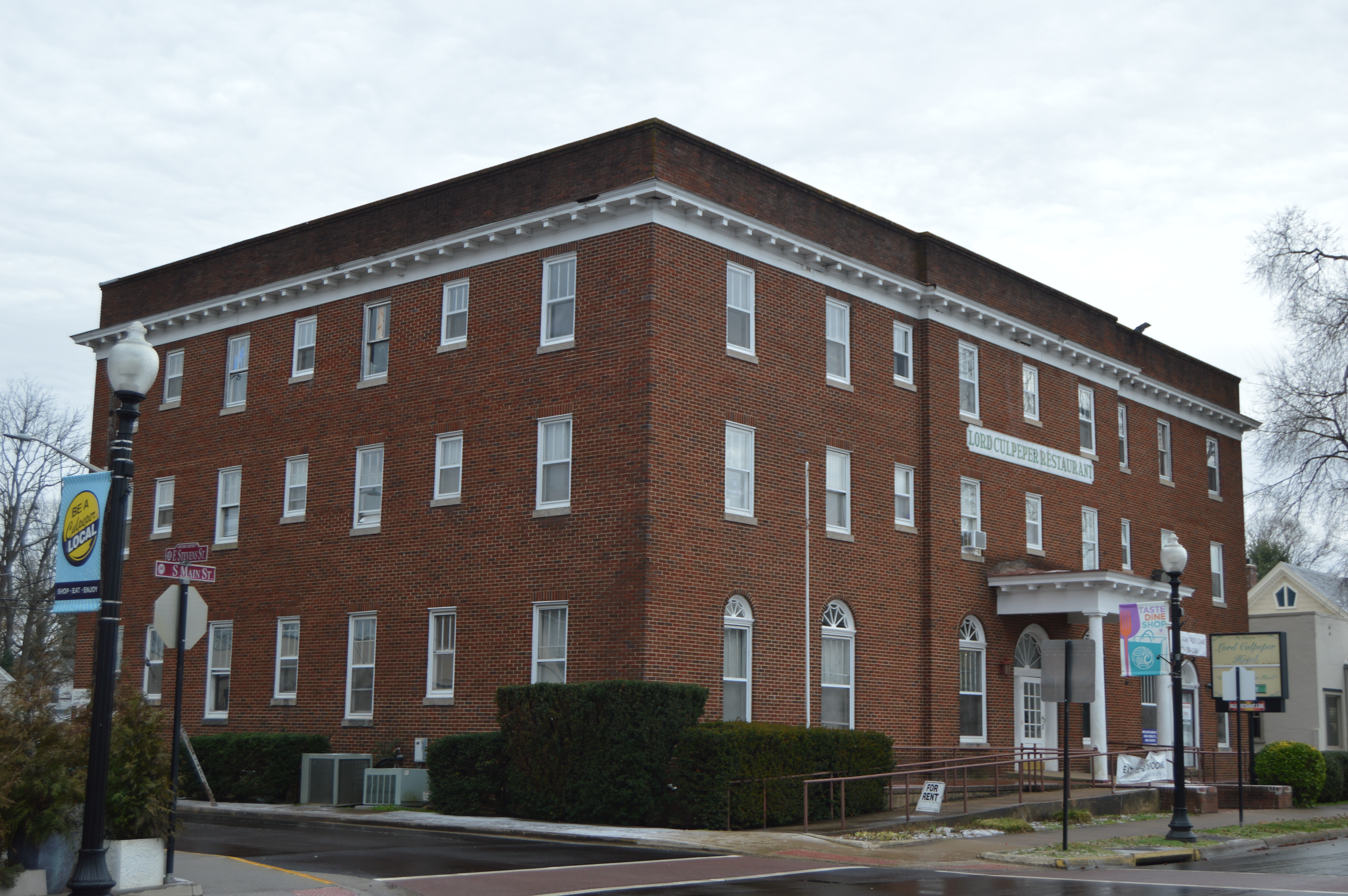
- Front and northern side

- Location within Virginia Location within the United States
- Location: 401 S. Main St., Culpeper, Virginia
- Coordinates: 38°28′16″N 77°59′48″W
- Area: Less than one acre
- Built: 1840
- NRHP reference No.: 100001078
- Added to NRHP: June 12, 2017

The Lord Culpeper Hotel is a historic hotel building at 401 South Main Street in Downtown Culpeper. It is a three-story brick building with Colonial Revival features, including round-arch windows on the ground floor, a columned entry portico, and a projecting modillioned cornice. It was built in 1936, and for many years it was the town's only hotel. It served local travelers until the 1970s.

The hotel was listed on the National Register of Historic Places in 1984.

== See also ==
- National Register of Historic Places listings in Culpeper County, Virginia
