= Richardville =

Richardville may refer to:

- Jean Baptiste Richardville, the last chief of a united Miami tribe
  - Richardville House, his house built near Fort Wayne, Indiana, U.S.
- Randy Richardville, state senator from Michigan, U.S.
- Richardville County, former name of Howard County, Indiana, U.S.
- Richardville Township, Minnesota, a township in Kittson County, Minnesota, U.S.

== See also ==
- Richardsville (disambiguation)
