= Macquarie College =

Location
- Wallsend, Newcastle, New South Wales; Australia; 32°55′21″S 151°39′05″E

Information
- Former name: Newcastle Seventh day Adventist High School
- Type: Independent co-educational early learning, primary and secondary day school
- Motto: In Him We Live
- Religious affiliation: Australian Union Conference of Seventh-day Adventists
- Denomination: Seventh-day Adventist
- Established: 1901
- Principal: Kelly Morton
- Years: Early learning and K–12
- Enrolment: 779 (2017)
- Campus size: 8 hectares (20 acres)
- Campus type: Suburban
- Houses: Dobell; Charlton; Shortland
- Colours: Navy blue, and white
- Athletics: Hunter Region Independent Schools
- Website: www.macquariecollege.nsw.edu.au

Macquarie College is an independent Seventh-day Adventist co-educational early learning, primary and secondary day school, located in the Newcastle suburb of Wallsend, New South Wales, Australia. The college is a part of the Seventh-day Adventist education system, the world's second largest Christian school system.

== Overview ==
Macquarie College traces its beginnings to July 1901 when the Junior School was opened in Lindsay Street, Hamilton. The College transferred to Kemp Street, Hamilton in 1933 providing primary and secondary schooling through to the Leaving Certificate and subsequently to the Higher School Certificate. In 1990, the Macquarie College Foundation was established with a view to the relocation and expansion of the College program. In 1992, an 8-hectare (20-acre) site on Lake Road, Wallsend (near Newcastle) was purchased for the new development. In June 1994, the College program was relocated to the new site providing educational services from the pre-school years (Ages 3–5) through to the Year 12 Higher School Certificate.

The college was officially opened by Peter Sinclair AC, Governor of New South Wales on 18 September 1994.

== Academics ==
Students from Macquarie College regularly perform above the state average in the School Certificate and Higher School Certificate examinations. Most go on to further their studies at tertiary institutions or universities.

== Spiritual aspects ==
All students take religion classes each year that they are enrolled. These classes cover topics in Biblical history and Christian and denominational doctrines. Instructors in other disciplines also begin each class period with prayer or a short devotional thought, many which encourage student input. Weekly, the entire student body gathers together for an hour-long chapel service. Outside the classrooms there is year-round spiritually oriented programming that relies on student involvement.

== Sports ==
The college offers soccer, swimming, netball, athletics and basketball.

== Notable alumni ==
- Aaren Russell, V8 Supercar driver
- Colin and Russell Standish, Seventh-day Adventist authors and theologists

== See also ==
- Seventh-day Adventist education
- List of Seventh-day Adventist secondary schools
- List of non-government schools in New South Wales
