= Rapidan Historic District =

Historic district in Virginia, United States

- U.S. National Register of Historic Places
- U.S. Historic district
- Virginia Landmarks Register
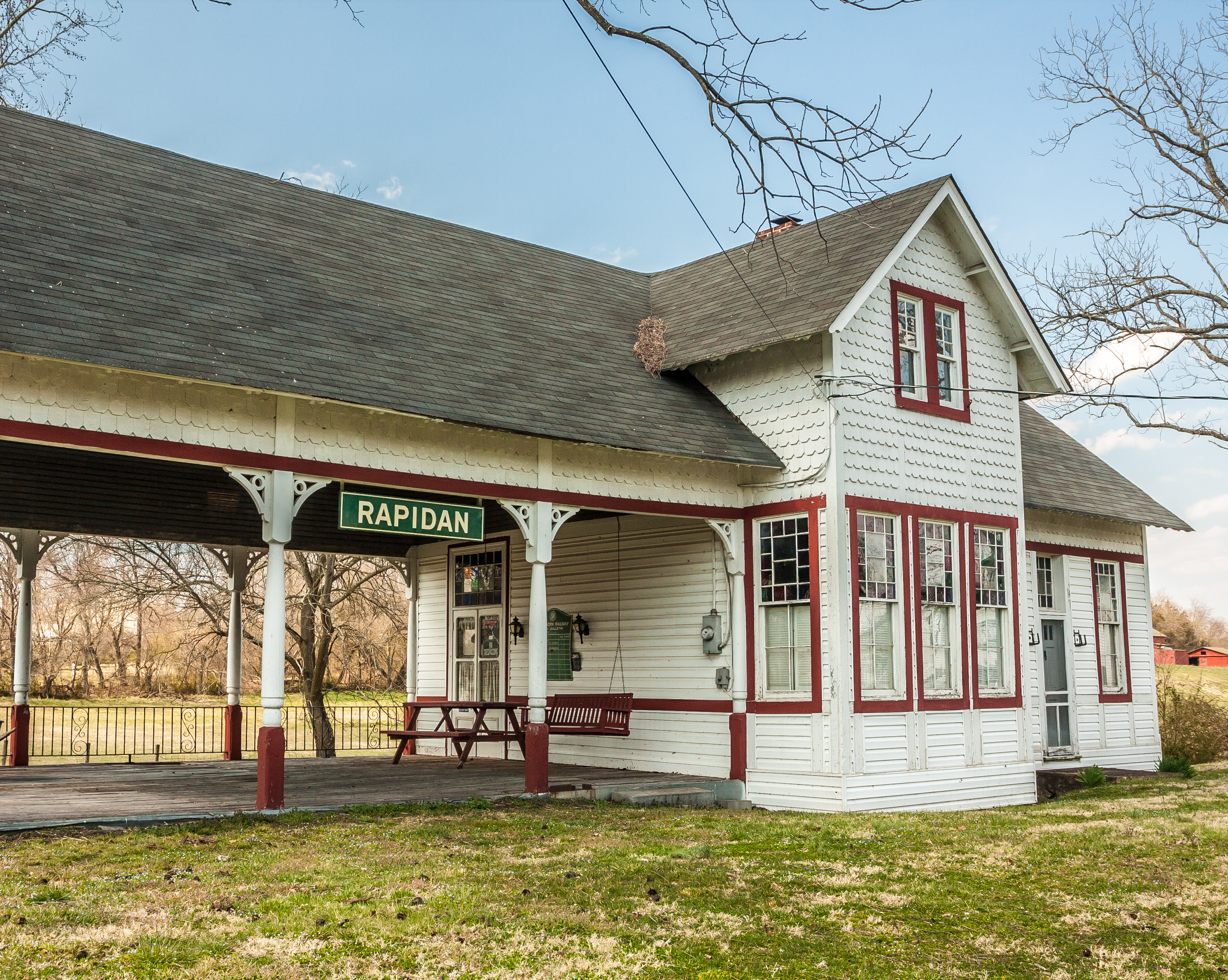
- Rapidan Passenger Depot, March 2013

- Location within Virginia Location within the United States
- Location: Jct. of VA 614, VA 615, and VA 673, Rapidan, Virginia
- Coordinates: 38°18′35″N 78°04′08″W
- Area: 182 acres (74 ha)
- Architect: Peyton, George Q.
- Architectural style: Late Victorian, Italianate, Victorian vernacular
- NRHP reference No.: 87000723
- VLR No.: 023-0052

Significant dates
- Added to NRHP: May 8, 1987
- Designated VLR: March 17, 1987

Rapidan Historic District is a national historic district located at Rapidan, in Culpeper County and Orange County, Virginia. It encompasses 34 contributing buildings in the crossroads village of Rapidan. They include three churches, a post office, a commercial building, one meeting hall, two railroad depots, twenty-one residences, and six outbuildings. Notable buildings include the Emmanuel Episcopal Church (1874), "Annandale" (c. 1825), the Rapidan Trading Post (1903), Rapidan Post Office (1914), Lower Rapidan Baptist Church (1914), Rapidan Passenger Depot (c. 1890), and the Peyton-Grhby House (c. 1890). Also located in the district is the separately listed Waddell Memorial Presbyterian Church.

It was listed on the National Register of Historic Places in 1987.
