= Standish brothers =

Australian historical Adventists

Colin D. Standish (27 October 1933 – 29 October 2018) and Russell Roland Standish (27 October 1933 – 2 May 2008) were identical twin brothers and "historic" Seventh-day Adventists. They were often referred to collectively as the Standish brothers. They co-authored many books together, which have been published by their Hartland Institute.

== Biography ==
The identical twin brothers were born on 27 October 1933 to Darcy Rowland Standish (1912–1997) and Hilda Marie Joyce Standish née Bailey (1912–74). Their hometown is Newcastle, New South Wales in Australia. From 1943 to 1949 they attended the Newcastle Seventh-day Adventist High School (now Macquarie College). They were baptised by pastor R. A. R. Thrift.

They studied at Avondale College in 1950 and '51, mainly studying primary teaching, and graduating from the "Theological Normal Course". As seventeen-year-olds in 1951, they attended an evangelistic meeting held by George Burnside in Newcastle, and were impressed.

Colin was an author and administrator, as well as the founder and president of the independent Adventist institute Hartland College. He received a PhD in psychology from the University of Sydney and later a master's degree in Education from the same university in Australia. He worked in both academic and administrative jobs at Avondale College, becoming President of West Indies College (now Northern Caribbean University), and President of Columbia Union College. as well as Weimar Institute. He was ordained to the Seventh-day Adventist ministry on 17 April 1971.

Russell was a medical doctor after completing his BA Hons and working for a short period as a teacher. In 1964, he completed medical training at the University of Sydney in Australia. Following internship at Royal North Shore Hospital in Sydney and subsequent hospital training, Russell worked at the Warburton Sanitarium and Hospital in Victoria, before being called to medical mission service in the Far Eastern Division of the Seventh-day Adventist Church. He subsequently worked as a Hospital Clinical Superintendent and physician in both the Penang SDA and Bangkok SDA hospitals, Southeast Asia and Australia at the Austin Hospital. as well as heading the Health Program at Enton Hall in the UK. Russell became a prolific author, commencing with the publication of "Conflicting Concepts of Righteousness by Faith etc", co-authored with Dr John Clifford in 1976. Russell later obtained specialist qualifications with the Colleges of Physicians of both England and Glasgow. He was ordained on 6 December 1980. After his dismissal from denominational employment, he founded Remnant Ministries and later ran Highwood, a health retreat in Victoria, Australia, that also ran outreach-oriented Bible courses for people interested in lay evangelism.

Russell spent the bulk of his career as a missionary physician in Southeast Asia, and also as a hospital administrator. He worked as the president of Bangkok Adventist Mission Hospital in Thailand, where he rescued the hospital from imminent closure, and as president of Penang Adventist Hospital in Malaysia. He later became Health Director of the South-east Asian Union of SDAs. Russell was dismissed from church service by the Australasian Division of Seventh-day Adventists in 1992 for continuing to write and speak against the doctrines of Dr. Desmond Ford that had made inroads into Adventist theology in the 1970s and '80s.

Russell and Colin were presenters at the Questions on Doctrine 50th anniversary conference in 2007, where they also distributed free copies of their papers, each presented in book form.

Russell died in a motor vehicle accident in Mildura, Victoria, Australia on 2 May 2008. A memorial service was also organized in Bangkok, Thailand, where his years of service were remembered by many of the grateful Thai people he had worked with and treated as a physician.

From 1983 to 2011 Colin was president of the Hartland Institute of Health and Education, acting as an author and as an invited speaker at many venues around the world. After leaving the post he was appointed "President Emeritus." He died on 29 October 2018.

== Beliefs ==
The Standish brothers had long been vocal supporters and prolific authors of "historic Adventism", the conservative wing of the Seventh-day Adventist Church. They became particularly strong supporters of a group of senior SDA pastors who, in 1976, openly objected to doctrines being taught at Australia's Avondale College under the leadership in the Theology Department of Dr Desmond Ford. This group of pastors and their supporters, such as the Adventist Laymen's Fellowship, became known as "Concerned Brethren". Their views and those of the Standish brothers were rejected by the leadership of the Australasian Division of SDA's in a Biblical Research group meeting in 1976. The Standish brothers' focus has always been to support Adventist theological beliefs against perceived inroads from competing views derived from other theological streams. As such they criticized what they saw as 'new theology' within the church, particularly evident since the 1957 publication 'Questions on Doctrine', which accepted Adventists, formerly believed to be a cult, as being closer to the evangelical mainstream. This view of acceptance was chiefly publicised in the periodical "Christianity Today". The Standishes predicted that the theology promoted by Dr Ford and Robert Brinsmead (so-called "forensic justification") in Australia and Dr Edward Heppenstall in the USA in the 1970s would lead to apostasy from other traditional Adventist doctrines, especially that of the Heavenly Sanctuary, unique to Seventh-day Adventism. Their view was vindicated by the removal of Dr Ford's ministerial credentials because of that very issue. This occurred after a meeting of Adventist scholars and administrators at Glacier View in the USA in 1980 that rejected Ford's assertions against the Sanctuary doctrine and other views of prophetic interpretation at odds with traditional Adventist belief. The Standish brothers also were strong supporters of Biblical Creation, the Adventist Health message and the prophetic gift of Ellen White.

Speaking of "Seventh-day Adventists", they have written there is "almost universal entry of apostasy and false standards within our midst". They had consistently called for revival and reformation in the church, something which the General Conference President, Robert Pierson in the 1980s also did, and has now become the focus of the leadership of the current GC President and Ted Wilson (2015).

== Publications ==
The Standish brothers have co-written dozens of books on Christian theology and lifestyle, including:

- Adventism Imperiled: Education in Crisis (1998) with Dennis C. Blum
- Deceptions of the New Theology (1999)
- Education for Excellence – The Christian Advantage
- Evangelical (1997)
- Liberty in the Balance
- Swarming Independents (1996)
- The Big Bang Exploded (1998)
- The Greatest of All the Prophets (2004)
- The Mystery of Death (2003)
- The Pope's Letter and Sunday Law (1998)
- The Perils of Timesetting (1992)
- The Rapture and the Antichrist
- The Road to Rome (1992)
- The Sacrificial Priest: The Sanctuary Message (2002)
- The Second Coming – Fervent Hope or Faded Dream
- The Twenty-eight Fundamentals
- Why Members Leave the Seventh-day Adventist Church (2007)
- Winds of Doctrine
- Youth do you Dare

Written by Colin only:

- Missionary to Jamaica
- Vision and Gods Providences: the Story of Hartland Institute

Written by Russell only:

- Adventism Vindicated: The Doctrine of Righteousness by Faith (1980)
- Georgia Sits on Grandpa's Knee (1999)
- The Sepulchres are Whited (1992)
  - Note: publication dates above do not necessarily refer to date of first publication.

See: Standish & Standish books on their website.

== See also ==
- Historic Adventism
- Hartland Institute
- Independent ministries of the Seventh-day Adventist Church
- History of the Seventh-day Adventist Church
