= Burgandine House =

Historic house in Virginia, United States

- U.S. National Register of Historic Places
- Virginia Landmarks Register
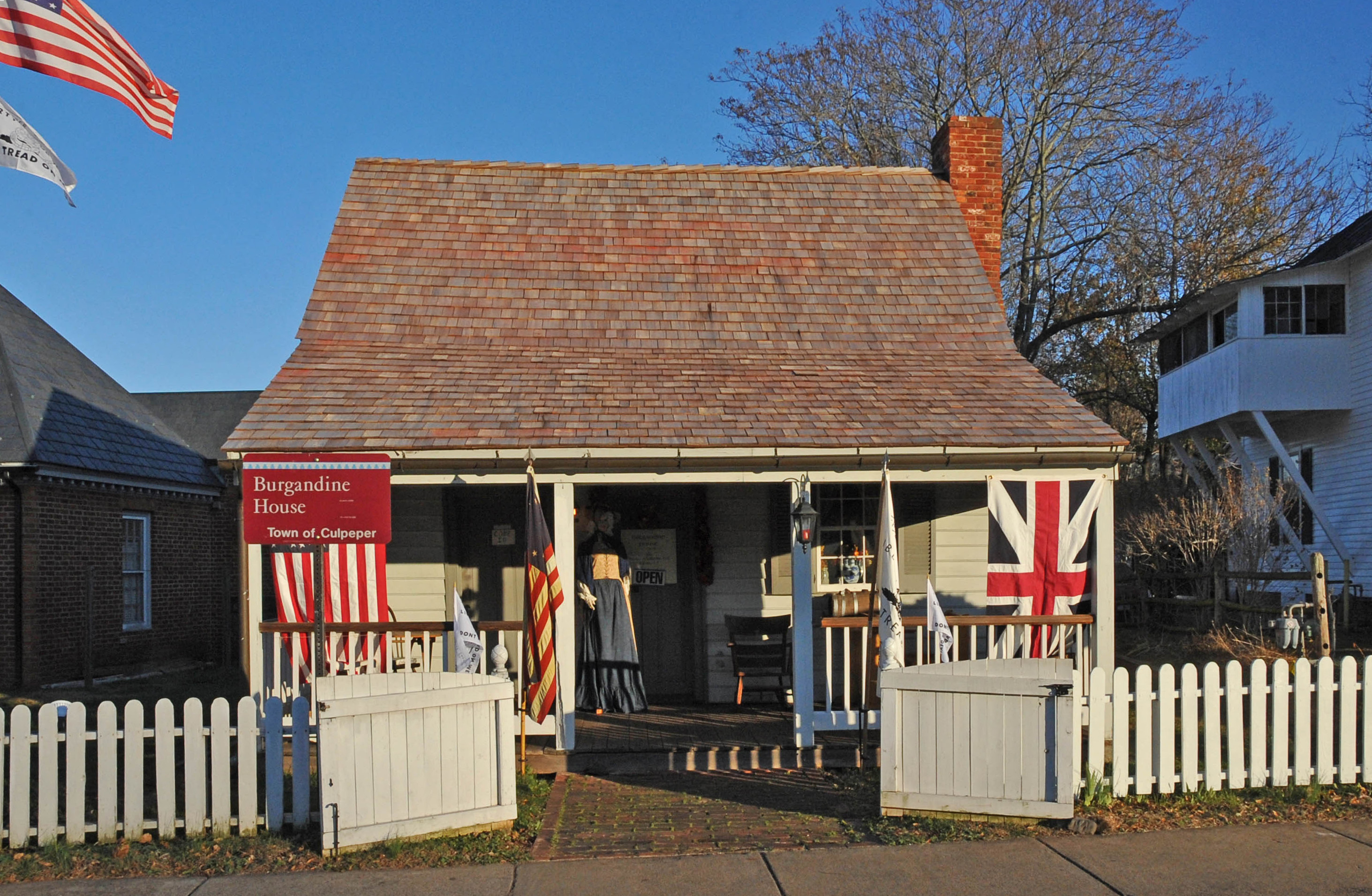

- Location within Virginia Location within the United States
- Location: 807 S. Main St., Culpeper, Virginia
- Coordinates: 38°28′6″N 77°59′49″W
- Area: 0.2 acres (0.081 ha)
- Built: c. 1800
- Architectural style: plank log cabin
- NRHP reference No.: 97000153
- VLR No.: 204-0005

Significant dates
- Added to NRHP: March 7, 1997
- Designated VLR: December 4, 2006

Burgandine House is a historic home located at Culpeper, Culpeper County, Virginia. It was built about 1800, and is a 1 1/2-story, plank log dwelling. It has a gable roof and weatherboard siding. The building served periodically for several years as the headquarters for the Culpeper Historical Society. It is considered the oldest residence in Culpeper.

It was listed on the National Register of Historic Places in 1997.
