= Locust Grove (Rapidan, Virginia) =

Historic house in Virginia, United States

- U.S. National Register of Historic Places
- Virginia Landmarks Register
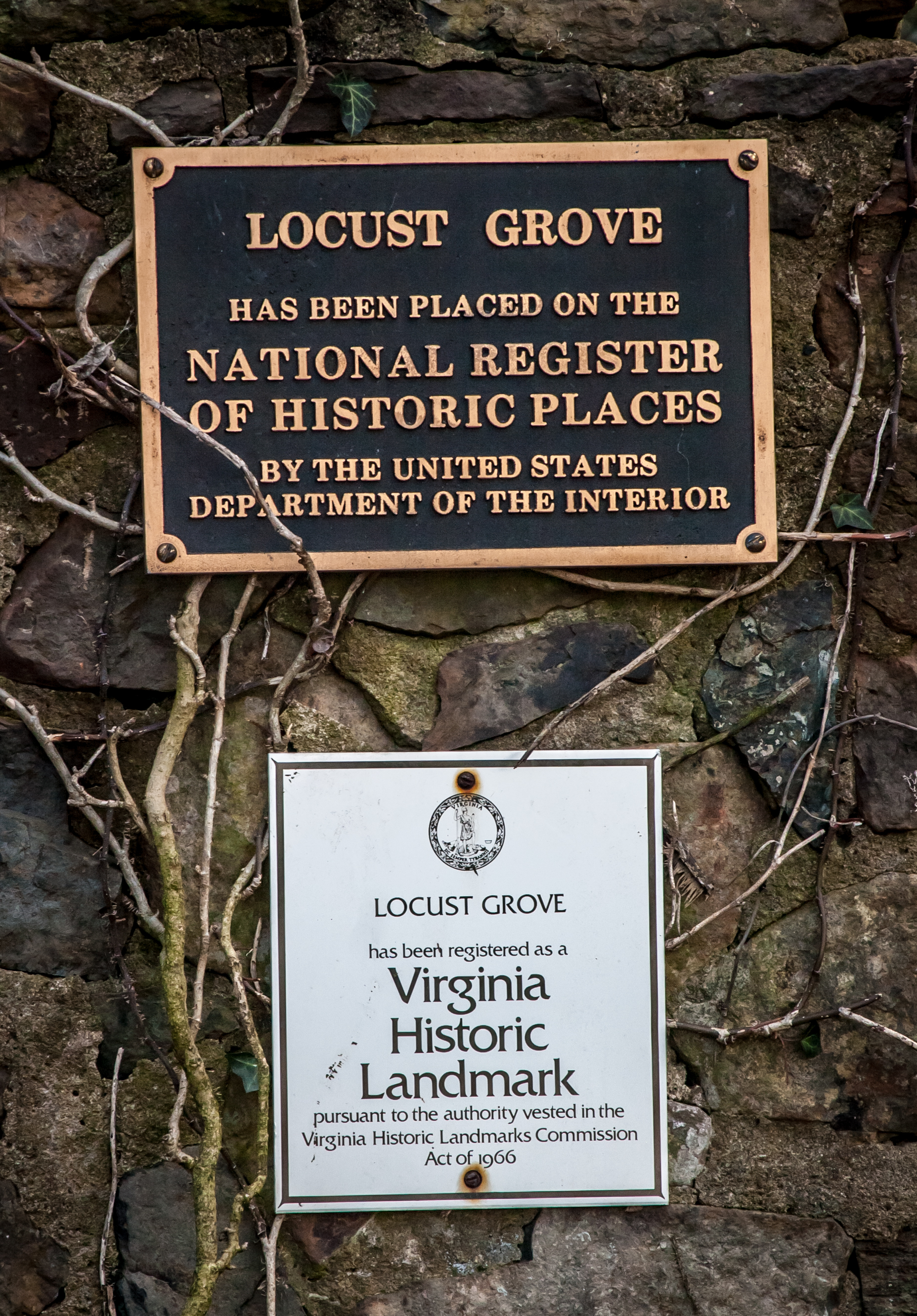
- Locust Grove NRHP Marker, March 2013

- Location within Virginia Location within the United States
- Location: Locust Grove Farm, VA 736, Rapidan, Virginia
- Coordinates: 38°18′59″N 78°02′46″W
- Area: 11.5 acres (4.7 ha)
- Built: c. 1730-1840
- Architectural style: Federal
- NRHP reference No.: 85003131
- VLR No.: 023-0049

Significant dates
- Added to NRHP: October 10, 1985
- Designated VLR: August 13, 1985

Locust Grove, also known as the Goodwin Farm, is a historic home located at Rapidan, Culpeper County, Virginia. The original section was built about 1730, and expanded in at least four major building campaigns over the next half-century. It had its present configuration by 1840. The house is a 1 1/2-story, four-bay, log and frame structure featuring a central chimney, two-room plan main block flanked by early gable-end lean-tos and rear additions. It has a steep gable roof with modern dormers. It was renovated in the 1970s. Also on the property is a contributing mid-19th century smokehouse.

It was listed on the National Register of Historic Places in 1985.
