= Croftburn Farm =

Historic place in Virginia, United States

- U.S. National Register of Historic Places
- Virginia Landmarks Register
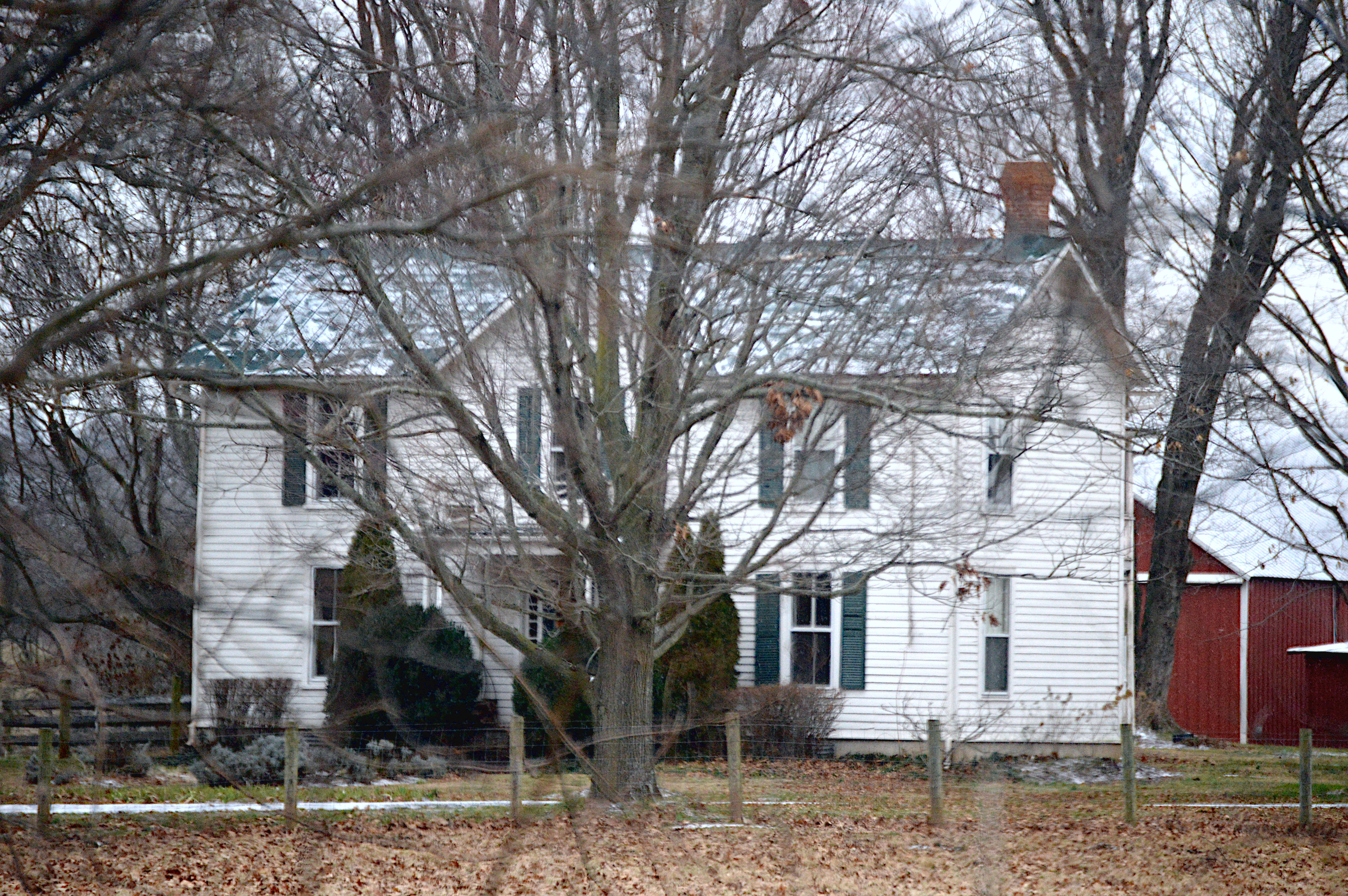
- Farmhouse

- Location within Virginia Location within the United States
- Location: 18175 Croftburn Farm Rd., near Culpeper, Virginia
- Coordinates: 38°27′29″N 77°57′32″W
- Area: 160 acres (65 ha)
- NRHP reference No.: 01000153
- VLR No.: 023-5040

Significant dates
- Added to NRHP: February 16, 2001
- Designated VLR: December 6, 2000

Croftburn Farm is a historic farm complex located near Culpeper, Culpeper County, Virginia. The complex includes the contributing Sprinkel-Bushong House (c. 1890–1900); the Cottage (c. 1938); the horse barn (c. 1880); the shop and attached privy (c. 1900); the small barn (c. 1870); the feed room (c. 1870–1880); the large barn (c. 1890); the garage (1920-1930); and the milk shed (c. 1900–1915).

It was listed on the National Register of Historic Places in 2001.
