= Eckington School (Culpeper, Virginia) =

- U.S. National Register of Historic Places
- Virginia Landmarks Register
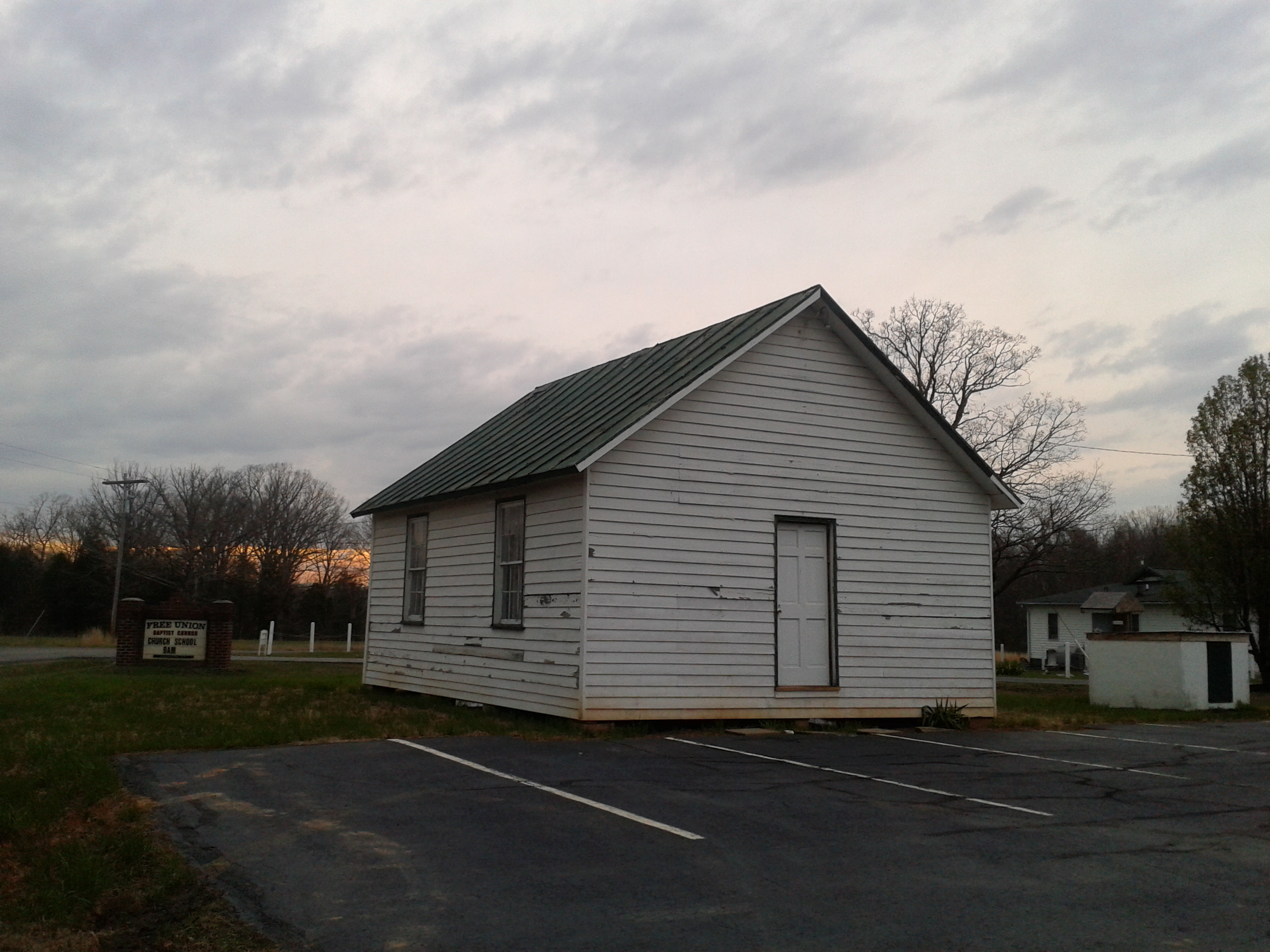
- School building at dusk, April 2017

- Location within Virginia Location within the United States
- Location: 102 N. Main St., near Culpeper, Virginia
- Coordinates: 38°24′13″N 77°55′27″W
- Area: 0.6 acres (0.24 ha)
- Built: 1895
- NRHP reference No.: 01000154
- VLR No.: 023-5041

Significant dates
- Added to NRHP: February 16, 2001
- Designated VLR: December 6, 2000

Eckington School, also known as Poplar Ridge School, is a historic school building for African-American children located near Culpeper, Culpeper County, Virginia. It was built in 1895, and is a one-story, vernacular frame structure. It measures 20 feet by 26 feet, and is clad in weatherboard. It was used as a school until 1941, after which it was used as a church hall for the adjoining Free Union Baptist Church. At that time, a 10 foot by 20 foot addition was built.

It was listed on the National Register of Historic Places in 2001.
