= Richardsville, Virginia =

Unincorporated community in Virginia, United States

Richardsville
- Village
- Interactive map of Richardsville
- First settled: Early 19th Century

Richardsville is a village in the Southern Area of Culpeper County, Virginia, United States. It is located between the Rapidan and Rappahannock rivers.

Richardsville was the site of many of Virginia's gold mines in the early 19th century. During the Civil War, a number of skirmishes and troop movements took place in Richardsville.
