= Lignum, Virginia =

Unincorporated community in Virginia, United States

- Unincorporated community
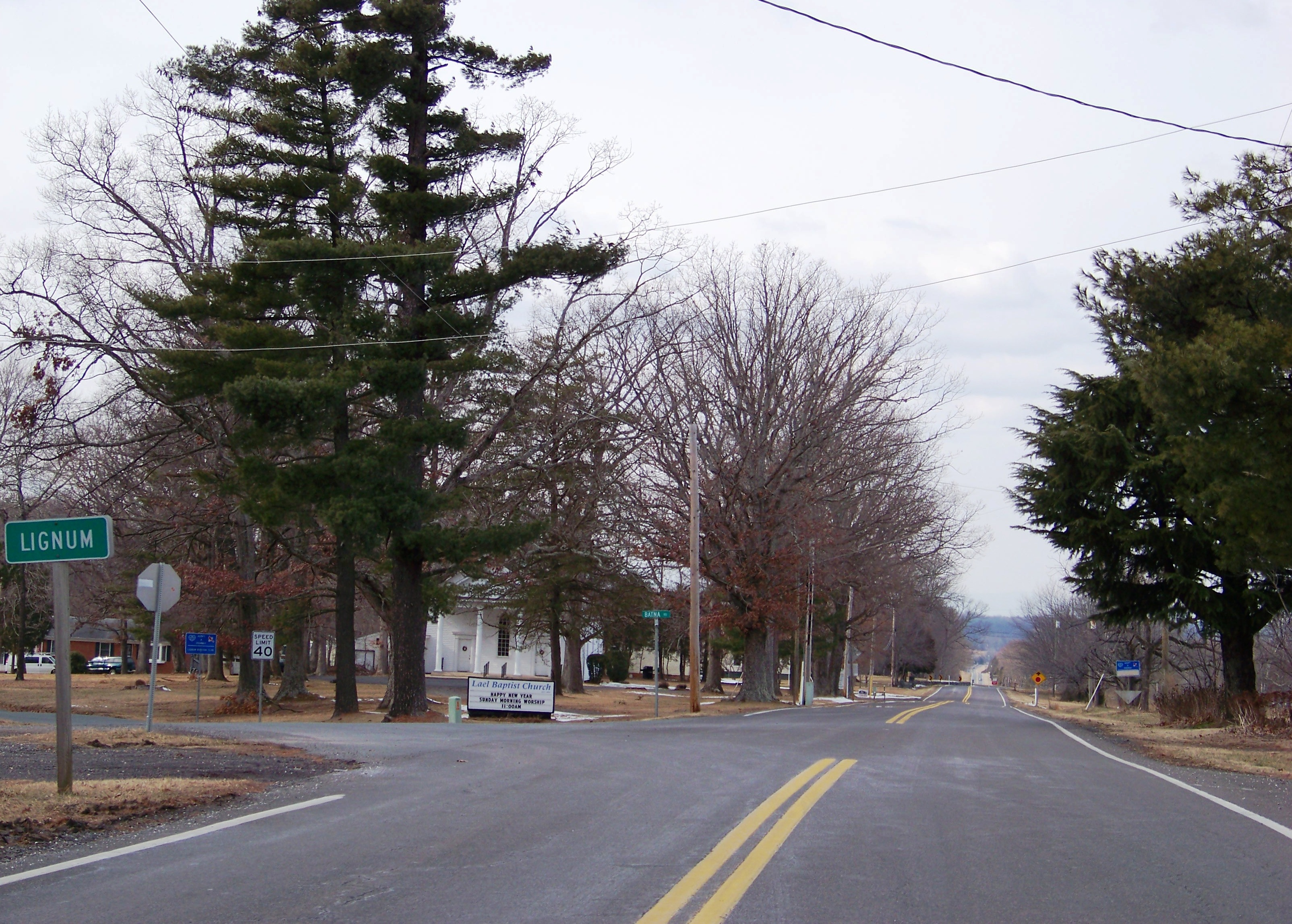
- Entering Lignum

- Location within Virginia Location within the United States
- Coordinates: 38°24′57″N 77°49′36″W
- Country: United States
- State: Virginia
- County: Culpeper
- Elevation: 404 ft (123 m)
- Time zone: UTC-5 (Eastern (EST))
  - Summer (DST): UTC-4 (EDT)
- ZIP code: 22726
- Area code: 540
- GNIS feature ID: 1495034

Lignum is an unincorporated community in Culpeper County, Virginia, United States. Lignum is located on Virginia State Route 3, 10 miles (16 km) east-southeast of Culpeper. Lignum has a post office with ZIP code 22726, which opened on November 14, 1877.
