= Rapidan, Virginia =

Unincorporated community in Virginia, United States

- Unincorporated community
- Location in Virginia Rapidan (the United States)
- Coordinates (city): 38°18′45″N 78°03′57″W
- Country: United States
- State: Virginia
- County: Culpeper & Orange
- Established: Mid- to late 1700s

Area
  - Total: 49 sq mi (130 km^{2})
- Elevation: 430 ft (131 m)

Population (2010)
  - Total: 1,469
  - Density: 30/sq mi (12/km^{2})
- Time zone: UTC-5 (EST)
  - Summer (DST): UTC-4 (EDT)
- ZIP code: 22733
- Area code: 540

Rapidan is a small unincorporated community in the Virginia counties of Culpeper and Orange, approximately five miles (8 km) northeast of the Town of Orange. The community, located on both sides of the Rapidan River, was established in the late eighteenth century around the Waugh's Ford mill. The Orange and Alexandria Railroad built a line through the town in 1854, a post office was built at the river crossing, and its name was changed to Rapid Ann Station. Milling remained a major industry in the area up through the mid-twentieth century.

== History ==
Its strategic location along both a railroad and a river brought about several destructive raids during the Civil War. Willis’ mill (ca. 1772), which stood in the location of the current mill, was burned along with several homes and other structures, although the miller's house remained. The village of Rapid Ann Station resumed its prominence as a regional shipping point after the railroad was rebuilt following the Civil War, particularly for lumber and wood products. Its name was changed once again in 1886 to the present-day Rapidan.

In 1987, the Rapidan Historic District, encompassing 35 contributing buildings and three noncontributing buildings within 182 acres (74 ha), was designated a National Historic District, added to both the Virginia Landmarks Register (VLR) and the National Register of Historic Places (NRHP). Contributing buildings include the Waddell Memorial Presbyterian Church, listed separately on the VLR and NRHP. Although not within the Rapidan Historic District, the community of Rapidan is also home to an eighteenth-century middle-class farmhouse known as Locust Grove (also known as Goodwin Farm), which was listed on the VLR and NRHP in 1985.

The community and surrounding counties are served by the Rapidan Volunteer Fire Department, officially formed in 1978.

== Geography ==
=== Climate ===
The climate in this area is characterized by hot, humid summers and generally mild to cool winters. According to the Köppen Climate Classification system, Rapidan has a humid subtropical climate, abbreviated "Cfa" on climate maps.

== Education ==
George Washington Carver Regional High School was opened in Rapidan in 1948 as a segregated school for the Black students of Culpeper, Orange, Madison, and Rappahannock Counties. In 1968, following desegregation, it became Piedmont Technical Education Center, which was renamed in 1992 to the George Washington Carver-Piedmont Technical Education Center.

== See also ==
- Rapidan Passenger Depot
- Battle of Brandy Station
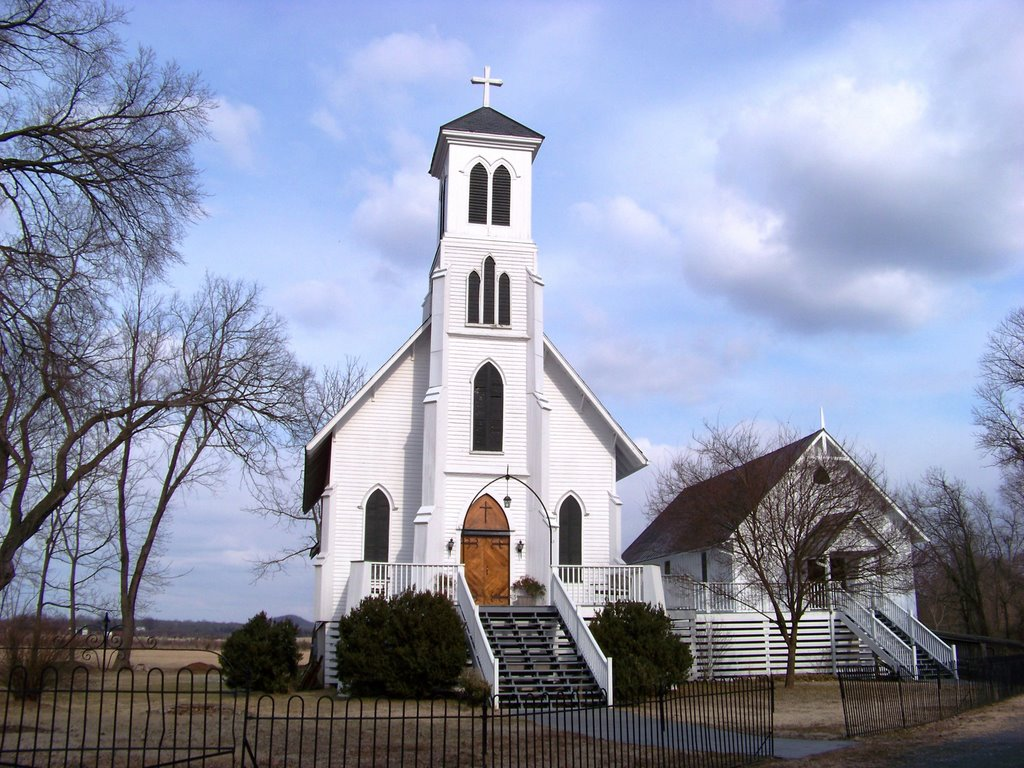
Emmanuel Episcopal Church

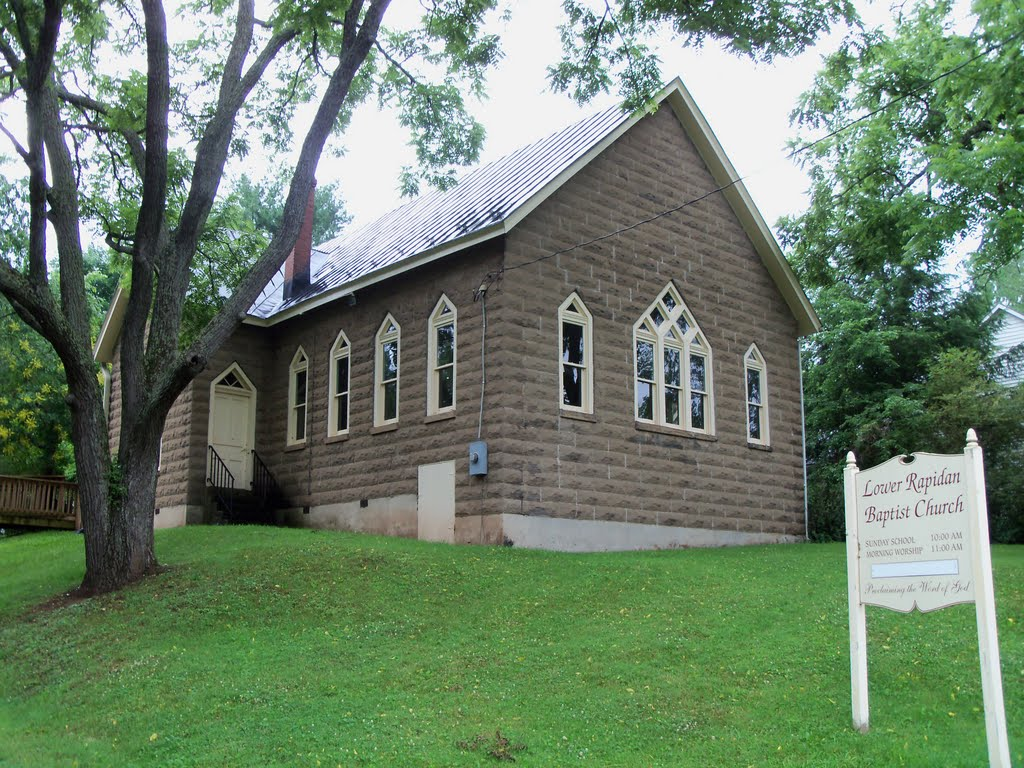
Lower Rapidan Baptist Church

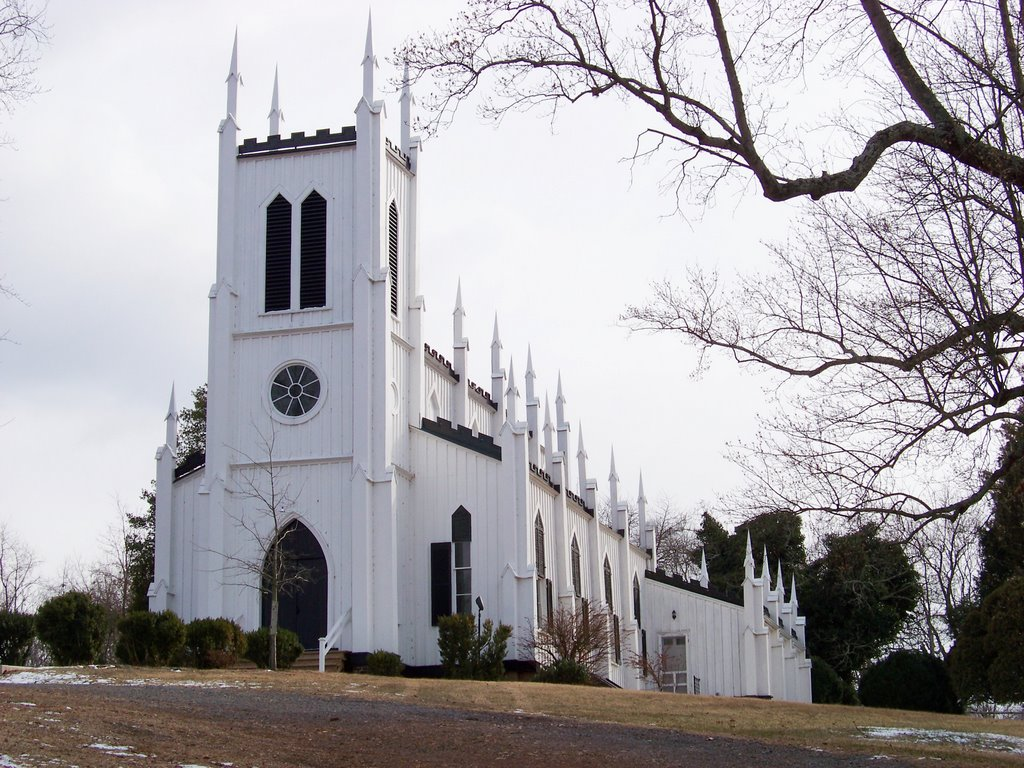
Waddell Memorial Presbyterian Church

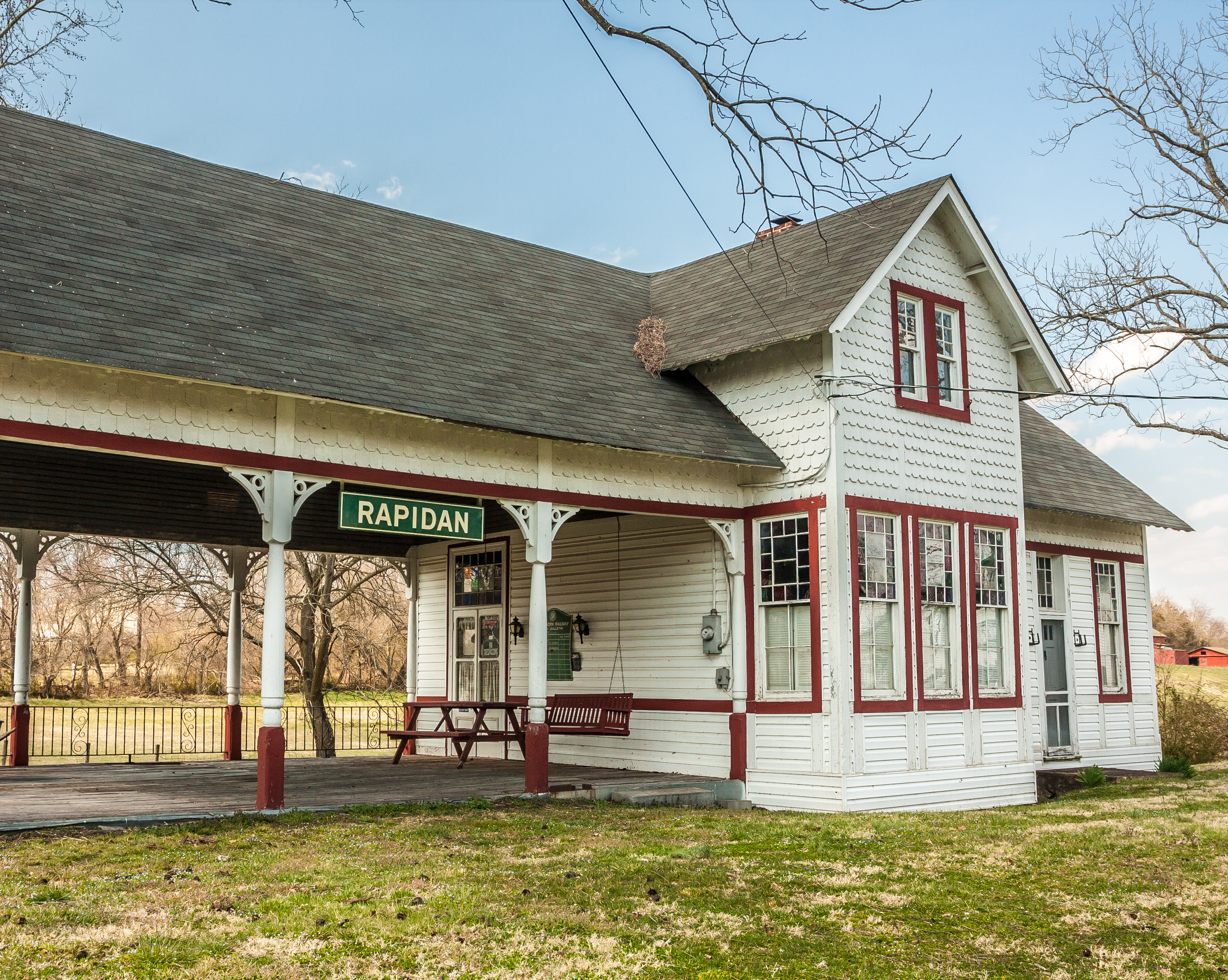
Rapidan Passenger Depot
