= Rixeyville, Virginia =

Unincorporated community in Virginia, United States

- Unincorporated community
- Location within Virginia Location within the United States
- Coordinates: 38°34′47″N 77°58′44″W
- Country: United States
- State: Virginia
- County: Culpeper
- Elevation: 446 ft (136 m)
- Time zone: UTC-5 (Eastern (EST))
  - Summer (DST): UTC-4 (EDT)
- ZIP code: 22737
- Area code: 540
- GNIS feature ID: 1493497

Rixeyville is an unincorporated community in Culpeper County, Virginia, United States. Rixeyville is located on Virginia State Route 229, 7.4 miles (11.9 km) north of Culpeper. Rixeyville has a post office with ZIP code 22737, which opened on February 16, 1818.

The Rixey family owned plantations in the area before the Civil War. U.S. Congressman John Franklin Rixey represented Virginia's 8th Congressional district for a decade (1897–1907).
