= Jeffersonton, Virginia =

Unincorporated community in Virginia, United States

- Unincorporated community
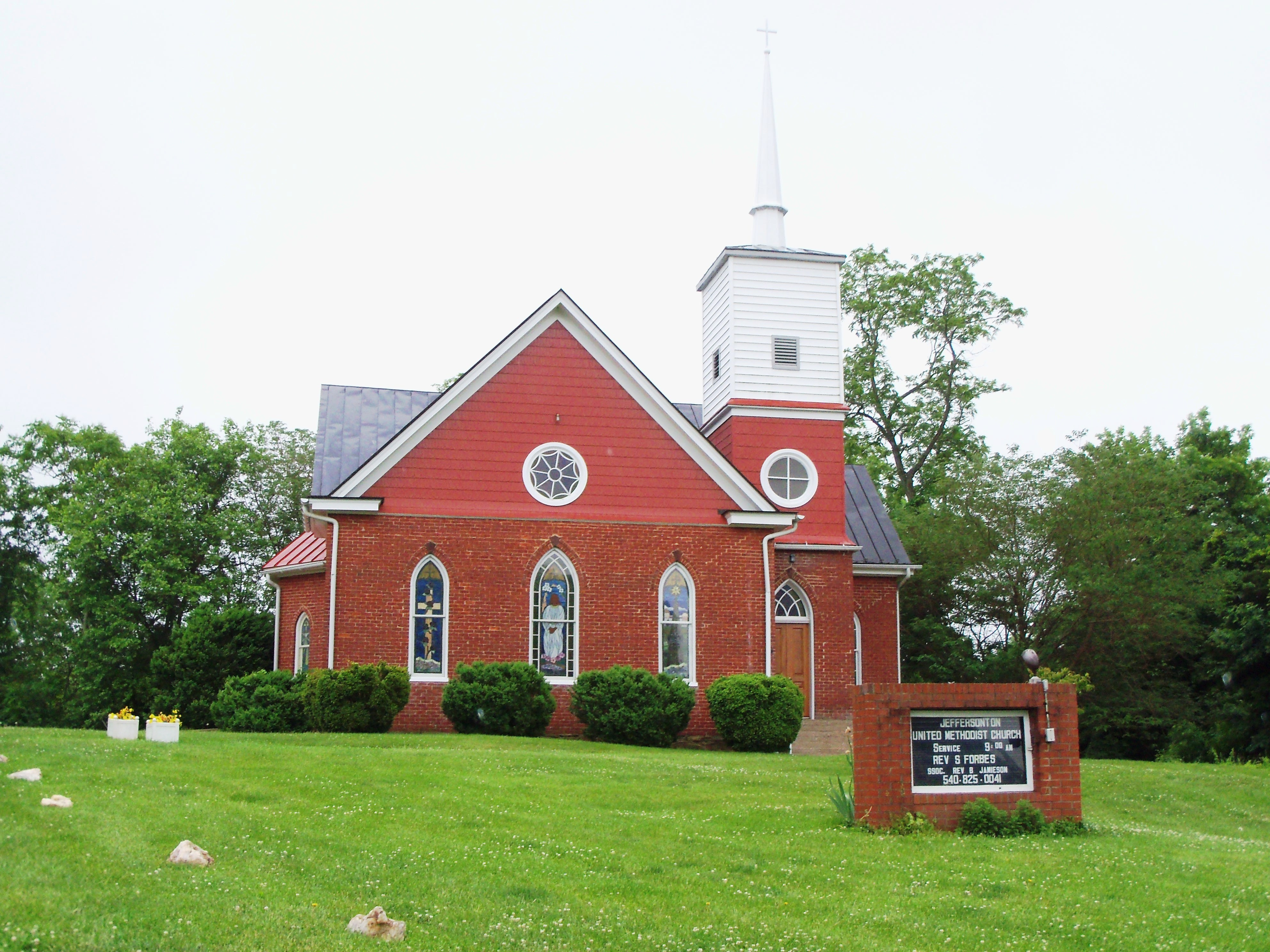
- Jeffersonton United Methodist Church

- Location within Virginia Location within the United States
- Coordinates: 38°38′13″N 77°54′54″W
- Country: United States
- State: Virginia
- County: Culpeper
- Elevation: 459 ft (140 m)
- Time zone: UTC-5 (Eastern (EST))
  - Summer (DST): UTC-4 (EDT)
- ZIP code: 22724
- Area code: 540
- GNIS feature ID: 1477444

Jeffersonton is an unincorporated community in Culpeper County, Virginia, United States. Jeffersonton is 12.2 miles (19.6 km) north-northeast of Culpeper.

== History ==
Jeffersonton was platted in 1798 and was named for Thomas Jefferson.

== Notable people ==
- William Meade Fishback; 17th governor of Arkansas and U.S. senator-elect for Arkansas
- Douglas W. Owsley; archaeologist and forensic anthropologist
