= Culpeper County, Virginia =

County in Virginia, United States

- County
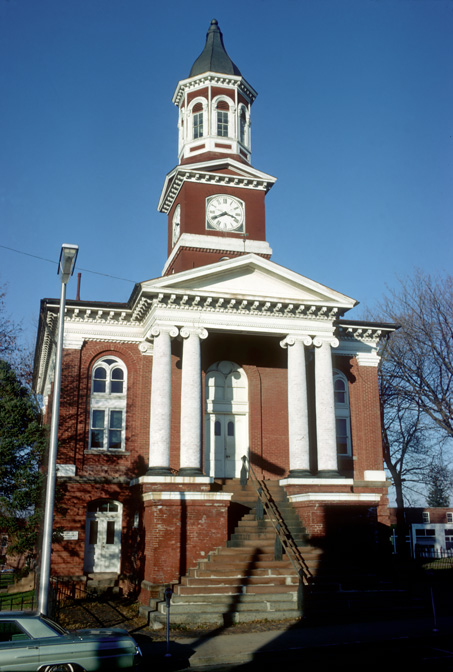
- Culpeper County Courthouse

- Flag Seal

- Location within the U.S. state of Virginia
- Coordinates: 38°29′N 77°58′W
- Country: United States
- State: Virginia
- Founded: 1749
- Named for: Catherine Culpeper, daughter of Thomas Colepeper, 2nd Baron Colepeper of Thoresway
- Seat: Culpeper
- Largest town: Culpeper

Area
  - Total: 383 sq mi (990 km^{2})
  - Land: 379 sq mi (980 km^{2})
  - Water: 3.3 sq mi (8.5 km^{2}) 0.9%

Population (2020)
  - Total: 52,552
  - Estimate (2025): 57,666 ▲
  - Density: 138.6/sq mi (53.5/km^{2})
- Time zone: UTC−5 (Eastern)
  - Summer (DST): UTC−4 (EDT)
- ZIP Codes: 22701, 22713, 22714, 22718, 22724, 22726, 22729, 22733, 22734, 22735
- Congressional district: 7th
- Website: www.culpepercounty.gov

Culpeper County is a United States county located in the north-central part of the Piedmont region of the Commonwealth of Virginia. The county is included in the Washington–Baltimore–Arlington, DC–MD–VA–WV–PA Combined Statistical Area, and its population was 52,552 as of the 2020 census. Its county seat is the town of Culpeper.

Culpeper County was created in 1749, and its first county surveyor was a young George Washington. The county and its residents played notable roles in America's early wars, including raising the Culpeper Minutemen, a militia that fought in both the Revolutionary War and the Civil War.

== History ==
=== Native American presence ===
At the time of European encounter, the inhabitants of future Culpeper County were a Siouan-speaking sub-group of the Manahoac tribe called the Tegninateo, allies to the Monacans and other central Virginian tribes further west. Captain John Smith mapped the area between the Rappahannock and Rapidan rivers in 1608, locating 4 Sioux villages therein.

The Manahoac were known to clear large tracts of forest to attract big game to their territory, and built impressive burial mounds. Though the tribe was initially sheltered from European encroachment by their position west of the fall line, they were steadily wiped out by disease and gradually increased conflict with settlers. The remnants of the tribe were first driven south towards the upper Mattaponi, then westwards into the Blue Ridge; they had largely disappeared from the Piedmont region by the time that Culpeper was intensively settled by the colonists.

=== Colonial settlement ===
In 1649, the 629,000-acre Northern Neck Proprietary was established by King Charles II as a one-seventh partition of the Crown's holdings in North America. The original recipient of this territory was John Colepeper, 1st Baron Colepeper of Thoresway. Upon his passing, control of the territory was transferred to his son, Thomas Colepeper, the 2nd Baron; in 1688 he received a new patent from King James verifying his claim to the territory, but died the following year. 5/6th of his share of the colony was inherited by his daughter, Catherine Culpeper, and her husband Thomas Fairfax, 5th Lord Fairfax of Cameron. Upon his death in 1710, control of the territory passed on to his son Thomas, the 6th Lord. The death of his grandmother in May of that year left him the remaining sixth share. Given that he was only 16 at the time, administrative authority fell to his mother, who would maintain it until her death in 1719, when the whole of the proprietary was passed on to Thomas.

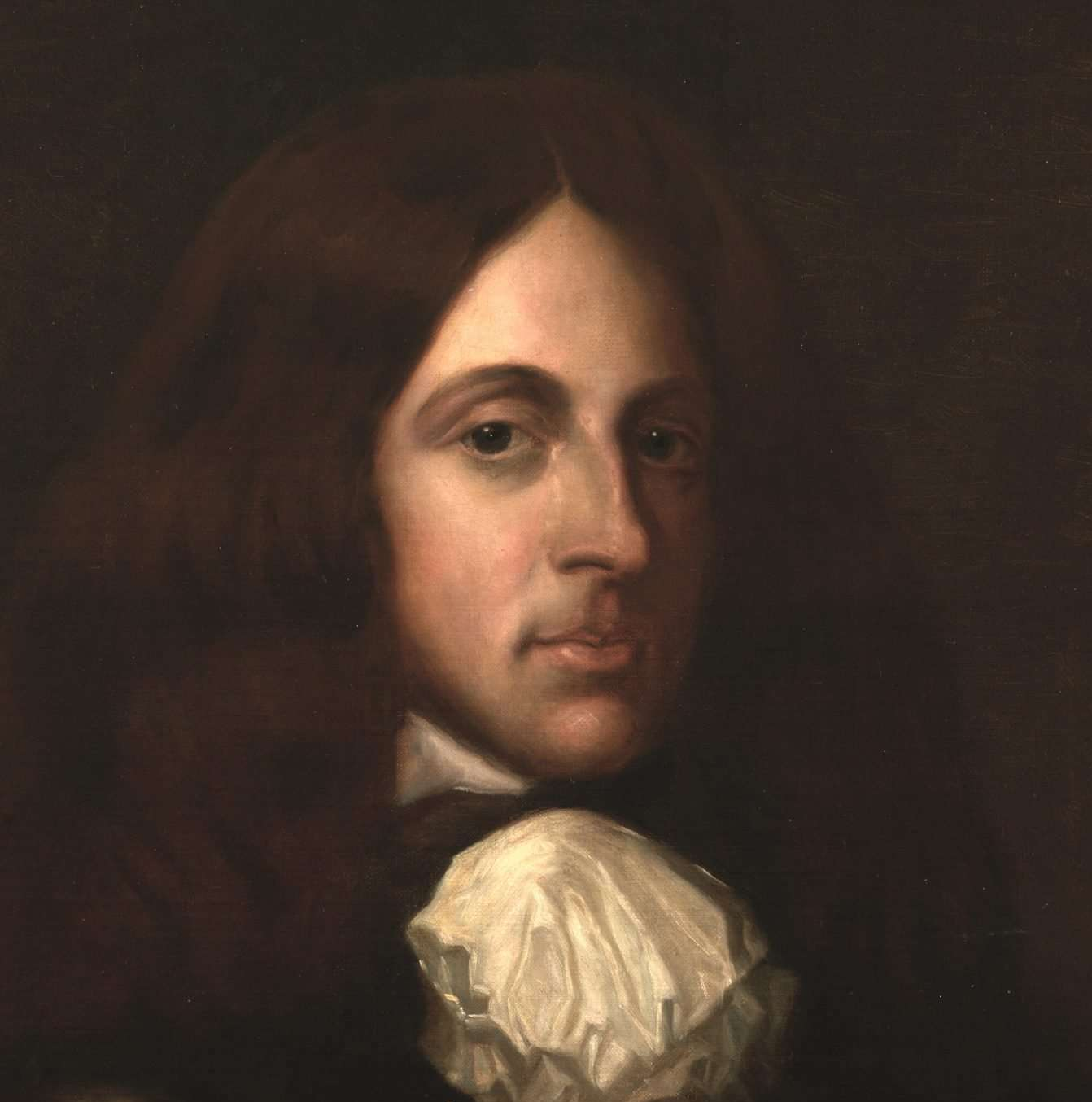
Thomas Colepeper, 2nd Baron Colepeper

In May 1749, the first Culpeper Court convened in the home of Robert Tureman, near the present location of the Town of Culpeper. In July 1749, Tureman commissioned 17-year-old George Washington as the first County surveyor. One of his first duties was to lay out the county's courthouse complex, which included the courthouse, jail, stocks, gallows and accessory buildings. By 1752 the complex stood at the present northeast corner of Davis and Main Streets. The courthouse village was named Town of Fairfax for Thomas Fairfax, 6th Lord Fairfax of Cameron (1693–1781).

=== Revolution and post-colonial era ===
During the Virginia convention held in May 1775, the colony was divided into sixteen districts. Each district had instructions to raise a battalion of men "to march at a minute's notice." Culpeper, Orange and Fauquier, forming one district, raised 350 men in "Clayton's old field" on the Catalpa estate; they were called the Culpeper Minute Men. In December, the Minute Men, marching under their flag depicting a rattlesnake and inscribed with the words "Liberty or Death" and "Don't Tread on Me", took part in the Battle of Great Bridge, the first Revolutionary battle on Virginia soil. The Culpeper Minute Men reorganized in 1860 in response to the impending Civil War and became part of 13th Infantry's Company B, fighting against the US Government forces. The Culpeper Minutemen were again organized for World War I, and joined the 116th Infantry.

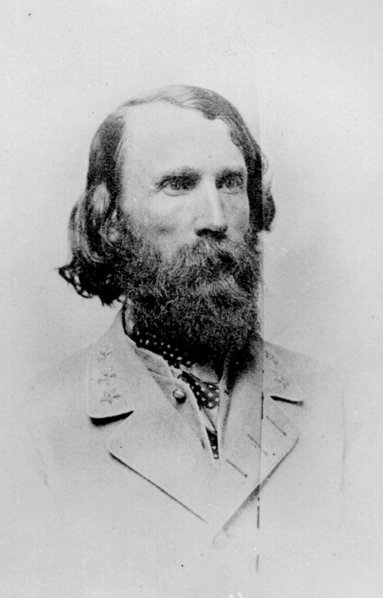
A. P. Hill is buried in Culpeper, his boyhood home

=== Antebellum and the Civil War ===
In 1833, based on the county's growing population and the need of those in the northwestern area for easier access to a county seat, the upper 267 square miles (690 km^{2}) of Culpeper County was partitioned off to create Rappahannock County, Virginia, which was founded by an act of the Virginia General Assembly.

The Battle of Cedar Mountain took place during the Civil War on August 9, 1862, and the Battle of Brandy Station occurred on June 9, 1863, in Culpeper County. Culpeper was the boyhood home of General A. P. Hill, who fought against Union forces.

=== 20th century ===
The negative impact of the Massive Resistance campaign against school integration led to the statewide election of a pro-desegregation governor. By the middle of the 1970s, Culpeper was the last county in Virginia to desegregate its public schools. In 2018 Culpeper County Public Schools has six elementary, two middle schools and two high schools. In 1935 the Rotary Club of Culpeper began a college loan fund, which in 1966 became a four-year scholarship based on academic achievement. The group also provides a Technical School scholarship based on academic achievement.

Culpeper County is home to Commonwealth Park, site for many world-class equestrian events. It was here that actor Christopher Reeve suffered his 1995 accident during a competition.

The town of Culpeper was rated #10 by Norman Crampton, author of "The 100 Best Small Towns in America," in February 1993.

=== 21st century ===
In April 2016, the county Board of Supervisors denied a routine request from the Islamic Center of Culpeper for a pump and haul permit to serve their envisioned mosque. This resulted in a lawsuit by the US Department of Justice in December.

== Economy ==
Culpeper County has a civilian workforce of 24,313. 30% of residents live and work within the county while 70% of workers commute out of the locality. The most residents are commuting to Fairfax or Fauquier counties. In comparison, the equivalent of 45% are in-commuters. The most in-commuters are coming from Orange County.

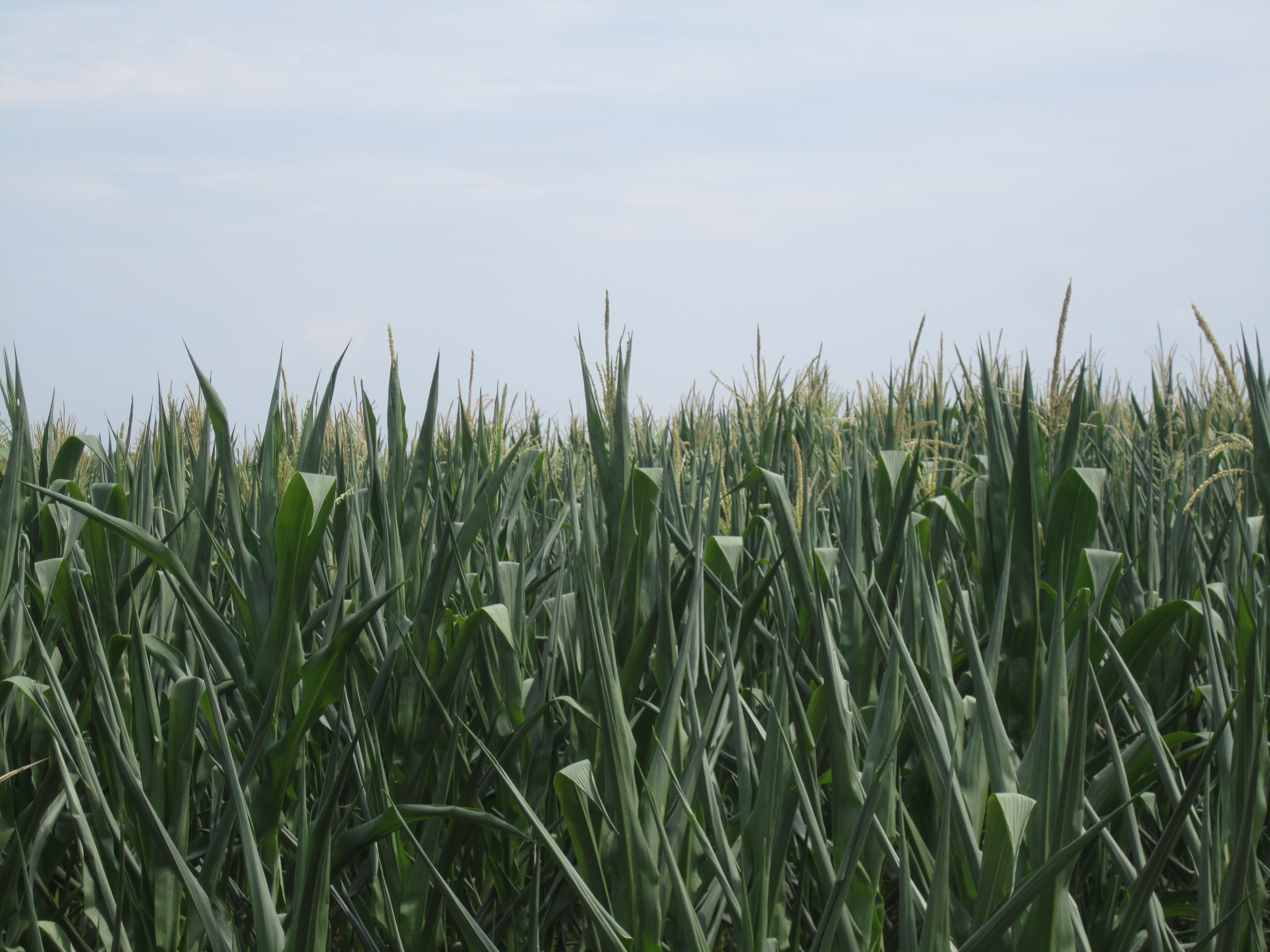
Cornfields east of Culpeper

The Top 10 non-governmental Culpeper employers as of March 2023:

1. Culpeper Memorial Hospital
2. Walmart
3. Masco (Cabinetworks)
4. S.W.I.F.T.
5. Bingham and Taylor Corporation
6. Continental Automotive
7. Cintas Corporation
8. Virginia Baptist Homes (The Culpeper Senior Living)
9. Communications Corporation of America
10. LaborReady Mid-Atlantic
  Culpeper County, Virginia (Charlottesville to Merrifield)

== Geography ==
The northeast border of Culpeper County is defined by the Rappahannock River which flows east-southeastward along its border, while the south border of the county is similarly defined by the meanders of the Rapidan River. The Hazel River flows eastward through the county, discharging into the Rappahannock on the county's east border, while the Thornton River also flows eastward through the county, discharging into the Hazel in the north part of the county. The county is in the foothills of the Blue Ridge Mountains, which are quickly accessed beginning with Old Rag Mountain and the Skyline Drive just up Route 522. The rolling hills generally slope to the south and east, with its highest point near its west corner at 705 ft (215 m) ASL. The county has a total area of 383 square miles (990 km^{2}), of which 379 square miles (980 km^{2}) is land and 3.3 square miles (8.5 km^{2}) (0.9%) is water.

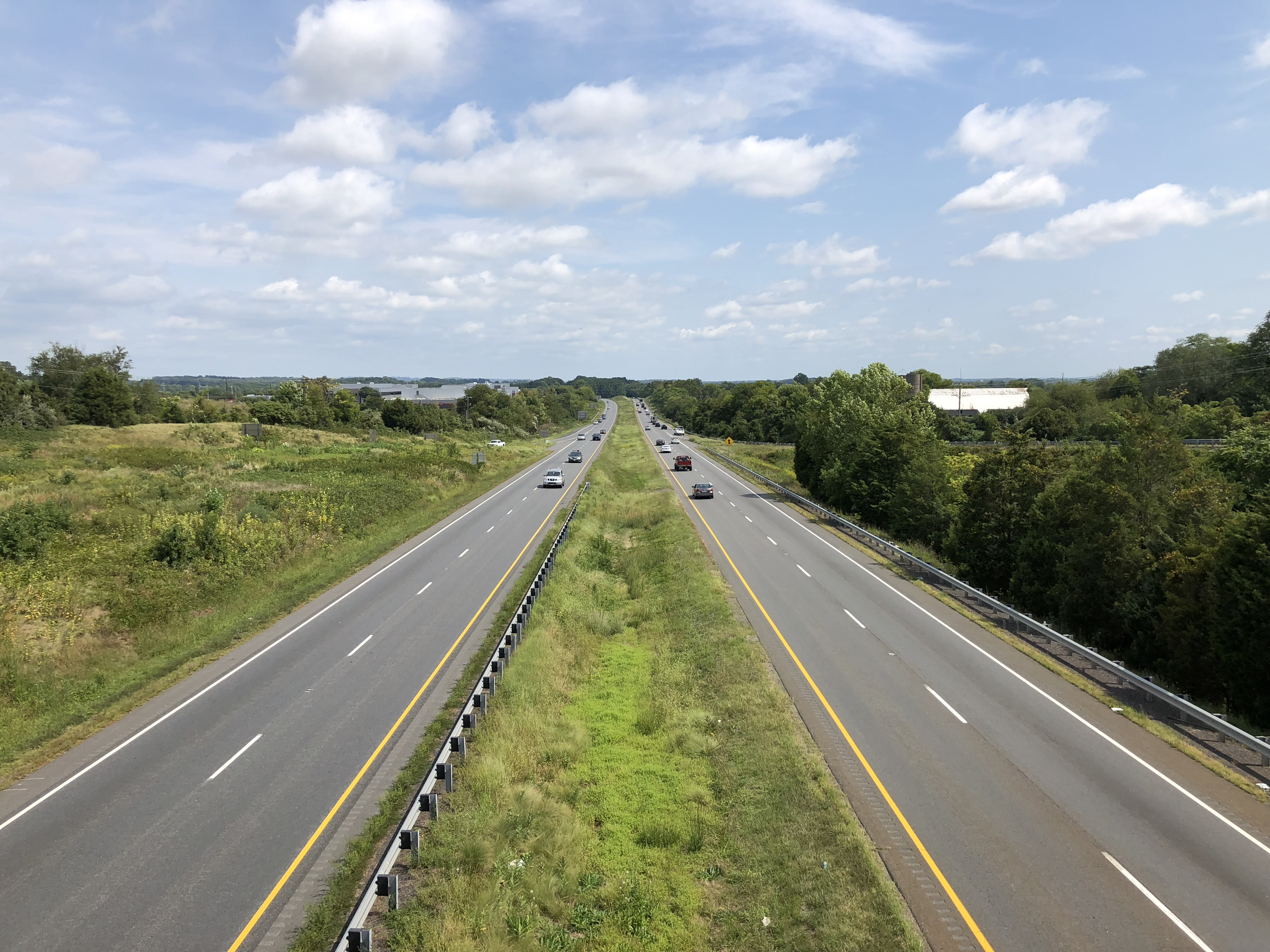
US 15/US 29 near Culpeper in Culpeper County

=== Major highways ===
- US 15
- US 29
- US 211
- US 522
- SR 3
- SR 229
- SR 299

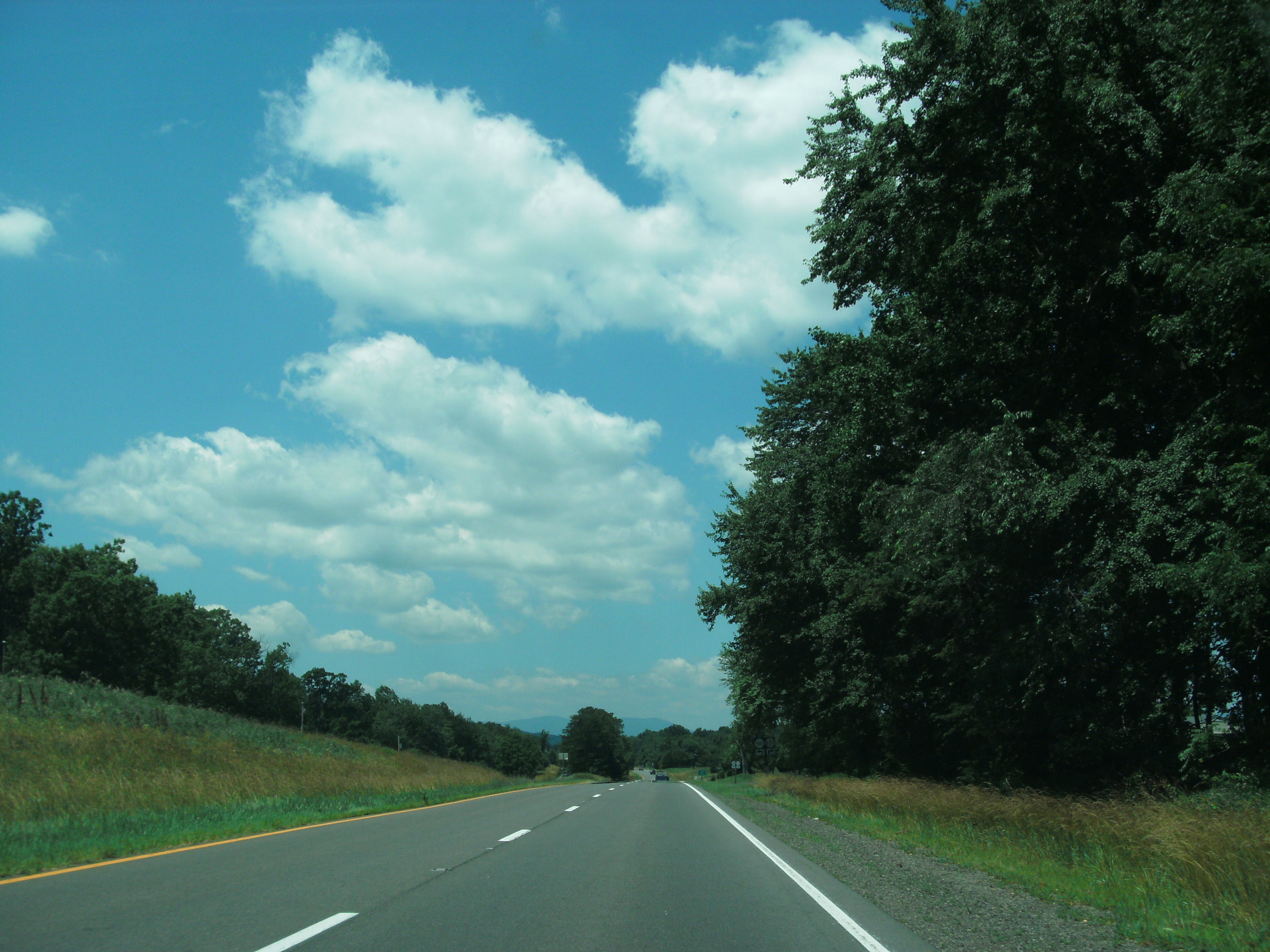
U.S. Route 211 as it passes through Culpeper County

=== Adjacent counties ===
- Fauquier County – north
- Stafford County – east
- Spotsylvania County – southeast
- Orange County – south
- Madison County – southwest
- Rappahannock County – northwest

=== Protected areas ===
- Brandy Station Battlefield Park
- Mountain Run Lake Park

=== Lakes ===
- Balds Run Reservoir
- Brandy Rock Farm Lake
- Caynor Lake
- Lake Culpeper
- Merrimac/Mountain Run Lake

== Government ==
=== Board of Supervisors ===
- Catalpa District: Paul W. Bates, Vice Chairman (I)
- Cedar Mountain District: David E. Durr (I)
- East Fairfax District: David C. Lee (I)
- Jefferson District: Brad C. Rosenberger (R)
- Salem District: Tom Underwood (R)
- Stevensburg District: Susan L. Gugino (R)
- West Fairfax District: Gary M. Deal, Chairman (I)

=== Constitutional Offices ===
- Clerk of the Circuit Court: Carson Beard (I)
- Commissioner of the Revenue: Terry L. Yowell (I)
- Commonwealth's Attorney: Russ Rabb (R)
- Sheriff: Timothy W. Chilton (I)
- Treasurer: Missy N. White (R)

=== State representatives ===
Culpeper County is represented by Republicans Bryce E. Reeves, Emmett W. Hanger Jr., and Jill Holtzman Vogel in the Virginia Senate, Republicans Michael J. Webert and Nicholas J. (Nick) Freitas in the Virginia House of Delegates, and Democrat Eugene Vindman in the U.S. House of Representatives.

Culpeper County has been a Republican stronghold for several decades. The last time a Democratic presidential candidate carried the county was 1964.

United States presidential election results for Culpeper County, Virginia
Year	Republican		Democratic		Third party(ies)	
Year	No.	%	No.	%	No.	%
1912	108	11.80%	752	82.19%	55	6.01%
1916	184	17.73%	849	81.79%	5	0.48%
1920	330	25.27%	973	74.50%	3	0.23%
1924	190	17.15%	876	79.06%	42	3.79%
1928	753	47.39%	836	52.61%	0	0.00%
1932	417	23.40%	1,349	75.70%	16	0.90%
1936	551	30.21%	1,266	69.41%	7	0.38%
1940	579	32.27%	1,208	67.34%	7	0.39%
1944	750	42.30%	1,022	57.64%	1	0.06%
1948	682	40.14%	804	47.32%	213	12.54%
1952	1,507	60.33%	987	39.51%	4	0.16%
1956	1,502	56.44%	966	36.30%	193	7.25%
1960	1,630	54.86%	1,332	44.83%	9	0.30%
1964	1,775	48.43%	1,886	51.46%	4	0.11%
1968	2,229	47.49%	1,239	26.40%	1,226	26.12%
1972	3,707	72.80%	1,316	25.84%	69	1.36%
1976	3,659	54.64%	2,892	43.19%	145	2.17%
1980	4,312	59.43%	2,519	34.72%	424	5.84%
1984	5,596	70.60%	2,255	28.45%	75	0.95%
1988	5,896	68.57%	2,555	29.71%	148	1.72%
1992	5,226	49.93%	3,444	32.91%	1,796	17.16%
1996	5,688	53.90%	3,907	37.02%	958	9.08%
2000	7,440	60.76%	4,364	35.64%	440	3.59%
2004	10,026	64.25%	5,476	35.09%	103	0.66%
2008	10,711	54.26%	8,802	44.59%	228	1.15%
2012	11,580	57.30%	8,285	40.99%	346	1.71%
2016	13,349	60.08%	7,759	34.92%	1,110	5.00%
2020	16,012	59.05%	10,617	39.15%	487	1.80%
2024	17,685	61.67%	10,557	36.81%	437	1.52%

=== Procurement ===
Recent media investigations regarding law enforcement procurement of military equipment through the 1033 Program offered by the Defense Logistics Agency identified Culpeper County as having received, as donations, a "Mine Resistant Vehicle" in 2013 worth $412,000 and 20 night-vision optics worth an additional $136,000.

== Demographics ==
Historical population
Census	Pop.	Note	%±
1790	22,105		—
1800	18,100		−18.1%
1810	18,967		4.8%
1820	20,944		10.4%
1830	24,027		14.7%
1840	11,393		−52.6%
1850	12,282		7.8%
1860	12,063		−1.8%
1870	12,227		1.4%
1880	13,408		9.7%
1890	13,233		−1.3%
1900	14,123		6.7%
1910	13,472		−4.6%
1920	13,292		−1.3%
1930	13,306		0.1%
1940	13,365		0.4%
1950	13,242		−0.9%
1960	15,088		13.9%
1970	18,218		20.7%
1980	22,620		24.2%
1990	27,791		22.9%
2000	34,262		23.3%
2010	46,689		36.3%
2020	52,552		12.6%
2025 (est.)	57,666	▲	9.7%
U.S. Decennial Census; 1790–1960 1900–1990; 1990–2000 2010 2020

=== Racial and ethnic composition ===
Culpeper County, Virginia – Racial and ethnic composition Note: the US Census treats Hispanic/Latino as an ethnic category. This table excludes Latinos from the racial categories and assigns them to a separate category. Hispanics/Latinos may be of any race.
Race / Ethnicity (NH = Non-Hispanic)	Pop 1980	Pop 1990	Pop 2000	Pop 2010	Pop 2020	% 1980	% 1990	% 2000	% 2010	% 2020
White alone (NH)	17,727	22,452	26,413	33,482	34,840	78.37%	80.79%	77.09%	71.71%	66.30%
Black or African American alone (NH)	4,618	4,764	6,188	7,212	6,453	20.42%	17.14%	18.06%	15.45%	12.28%
Native American or Alaska Native alone (NH)	48	86	96	129	110	0.21%	0.31%	0.28%	0.28%	0.21%
Asian alone (NH)	51	289	225	593	767	0.23%	1.04%	0.66%	1.27%	1.46%
Native Hawaiian or Pacific Islander alone (NH)	x (Note: included in the Asian category in the 1980 Census)	x (Note: included in the Asian category in the 1990 Census)	4	12	20	x	x	0.01%	0.03%	0.04%
Other race alone (NH)	18	8	59	100	233	0.08%	0.03%	0.17%	0.21%	0.44%
Mixed race or Multiracial (NH)	x (Note: not an option in the 1980 Census)	x (Note: not an option in the 1990 Census)	419	1,004	2,620	x	x	1.22%	2.15%	4.99%
Hispanic or Latino (any race)	158	192	858	4,157	7,509	0.70%	0.69%	2.50%	8.90%	14.29%
Total	22,620	27,791	34,262	46,689	52,552	100.00%	100.00%	100.00%	100.00%	100.00%

=== 2020 census ===
As of the 2020 census, the county had a population of 52,552. The median age was 39.8 years. 24.1% of residents were under the age of 18 and 16.7% of residents were 65 years of age or older. For every 100 females there were 98.9 males, and for every 100 females age 18 and over there were 98.1 males age 18 and over.

The racial makeup of the county was 68.7% White, 12.5% Black or African American, 0.7% American Indian and Alaska Native, 1.5% Asian, 0.0% Native Hawaiian and Pacific Islander, 7.7% from some other race, and 8.9% from two or more races. Hispanic or Latino residents of any race comprised 14.3% of the population.

42.9% of residents lived in urban areas, while 57.1% lived in rural areas.

There were 18,181 households in the county, of which 34.9% had children under the age of 18 living with them and 23.4% had a female householder with no spouse or partner present. About 21.6% of all households were made up of individuals and 10.0% had someone living alone who was 65 years of age or older.

There were 19,185 housing units, of which 5.2% were vacant. Among occupied housing units, 72.8% were owner-occupied and 27.2% were renter-occupied. The homeowner vacancy rate was 1.2% and the rental vacancy rate was 3.7%.

=== 2000 census ===
As of the 2000 United States census, there were 34,262 people, 12,141 households, and 9,045 families in the county. The population density was 90.4 people per square mile (34.9 people/km^{2}). There were 12,871 housing units at an average density of 34.0 units per square mile (13.1 units/km^{2}). The racial makeup of the county was 68.27% White, 28.15% Black or African American, 0.33% Native American, 0.66% Asian, 0.01% Pacific Islander, 1.15% from other races, and 1.43% from two or more races. 2.50% of the population were Hispanic or Latino of any race.

There were 12,141 households, out of which 35.00% had children under the age of 18 living with them, 58.50% were married couples living together, 11.30% had a female householder with no husband present, and 25.50% were non-families. 20.60% of all households were made up of individuals, and 7.90% had someone living alone who was 65 years of age or older. The average household size was 2.68 and the average family size was 3.08.

The county population contained 25.70% under the age of 18, 8.10% from 18 to 24, 31.10% from 25 to 44, 23.30% from 45 to 64, and 11.90% who were 65 years of age or older. The median age was 36 years. For every 100 females, there were 103.30 males. For every 100 females age 18 and over, there were 103.20 males.

The median income for a household in the county was $45,290, and the median income for a family was $51,475. Males had a median income of $36,621 versus $25,985 for females. The per capita income for the county was $20,162. About 27.00% of families and 29.20% of the population were below the poverty line, including 38.30% of those under age 18 and 28.60% of those age 65 or over.

== Education ==
Culpeper County Public Schools is the school district covering the entire county.

=== Elementary schools ===
- A.G. Richardson Elementary
- Banner Christian
- Culpeper Christian
- Emerald Hill Elementary
- Epiphany Catholic School
- Farmington Elementary
- Pearl Sample Elementary
- Sycamore Park Elementary
- Yowell Elementary

=== Middle schools ===
- Banner Christian
- Culpeper Christian
- Culpeper Middle
- Floyd T. Binns Middle

=== High schools ===
- Culpeper County High School
- Eastern View High School
- Culpeper Technical Education Center

== Communities ==

Below is a list of formal and informal communities in the county.

=== Towns ===
- Boston
- Culpeper (County seat)
- Elkwood
- Reva

=== Census-designated places ===
- Brandy Station

=== Unincorporated communities ===
- Buena
- Cardova
- Catalpa
- Eggbornsville
- Eldorada
- Griffinsburg

- Jeffersonton
- Kellys Ford
- Lagrange
- Lignum
- Mitchells
- Rapidan
- Richardsville

- Rixeyville
- Stevensburg
- Wakefield
- Waterloo
- Winston
- Torrance

== Notable people ==
- Maliq Brown - (b. 2003) college basketball player
- Pete Hill - (1882–1951) professional baseball player, in Hall of Fame
- Big Kenny - (b. 1963) country music singer
- Dangerfield Newby – (c.1820 – October 17, 1859), one of John Brown's men killed in the raid on the federal armory at Harper's Ferry, VA
- Eppa Rixey – (1891–1963) professional baseball player, in Hall of Fame
- D. French Slaughter Jr. – US Congressman (1985–1991)
- Andrew Stevenson – Speaker of the House of Representatives
- French Strother – (1730–1800) significant political figure in early national history

== See also ==
- National Register of Historic Places listings in Culpeper County, Virginia
