= Hill House =

Hill House, or variations such as Hill Cottage and Hill Farm, may refer to:

== In England ==
- Hill House, Richmond, North Yorkshire, a grade II*-listed house

== In Scotland ==
- Hill House, Helensburgh, Scotland, a house designed by architect Charles Rennie Mackintosh

== In the United States ==
- Hugh Wilson Hill House, Carrollton, Alabama
- Hill House (Prescott, Arizona), listed on the NRHP in Yavapai County, Arizona
- Hill Farm (Beebe, Arkansas)
- Hill–Carrillo Adobe, Santa Barbara, California
- Hill–Stead Museum, Farmington, Connecticut, a house that is a National Historic Landmark
- Robert Hill House, Kenton, Delaware
- Dr. George E. Hill House, Merritt Island, Florida
- A. P. Hill House, Clarkesville, Georgia
- Hiram Warner Hill House, Greenville, Georgia, listed on the NRHP in Meriwether County, Georgia
- Burwell O. Hill House, Greenville, Georgia, listed on the NRHP in Meriwether County, Georgia
- Hill–Kurtz House, Griffin, Georgia
- Hill Hall at Savannah State College, Savannah, Georgia
- W.H. Hill House, Hilo, Hawaii, listed on the NRHP in Hawaii County, Hawaii
- Matt N. Hill Homestead Barn, McCall, Idaho
- Clara Hill House, Meridian, Idaho
- Hayward–Hill House, Hillsboro, Illinois
- William Hill Polygonal Barn, Bloomingdale, Indiana
- John Fitch Hill House, Indianapolis, Indiana
- Samuel E. Hill House, Hartford, Kentucky
- Dr. Oliver Perry Hill House, Lancaster, Kentucky, listed on the NRHP in Garrard County, Kentucky
- The Hill (Arcadia, Louisiana), listed on the NRHP in Bienville Parish, Louisiana
- Gov. John F. Hill Mansion, Augusta, Maine
- McCobb–Hill–Minott House, Phippsburg, Maine
- Hill House (Parkton, Maryland)
- Addison Hill House, Arlington, Massachusetts
- Abraham Hill House, Belmont, Massachusetts
- Deacon Samuel Hill House, Billerica, Massachusetts
- Aaron Hill House, Cambridge, Massachusetts
- Moore–Hill House, Peabody, Massachusetts
- Sidney A. Hill House, Stoneham, Massachusetts
- Rev. Thomas Hill House, Waltham, Massachusetts
- James J. Hill House, St. Paul, Minnesota, a National Historic Landmark
- Matt and Emma Hill Historic Farmstead, Tower, Minnesota
- Redding–Hill House, Keytesville, Missouri
- Hill–Lassonde House, Manchester, New Hampshire
- Slaughter–Hill Ranch, Roswell, New Mexico, (see also Slaughter-Hill House in Virginia)
- Nathaniel Hill Brick House, Montgomery, New York
- Hill Cottage (Saranac Lake, New York)
- John Sprunt Hill House, Durham, North Carolina
- Buckner Hill House, Faison, North Carolina
- J. S. Hill House, Winston-Salem, North Carolina
- James Hill House, Cleveland, Ohio, listed on the NRHP in Cleveland, Ohio
- James Delos Hill House, Montpelier, Ohio, listed on the NRHP in Williams County, Ohio
- Martin and Carrie Hill House, Hood River, Oregon
- Hill House (Boalsburg, Pennsylvania)
- John Hill House, Erie, Pennsylvania
- Hill–Physick House, Philadelphia, Pennsylvania, NRHP-listed
- Alexander–Hill House, Seneca, South Carolina
- John Hill–Keltomaki Ranch, Brownsville, South Dakota
- Hill–Hance House, Chestnut Hill, Tennessee
- Abraham Wiley Hill House, Hills Prairie, Texas, listed on the NRHP in Bastrop County, Texas
- Kirby–Hill House, Kountze, Texas
- Ben Hill House, McKinney, Texas, listed on the NRHP in Collin County, Texas
- Davis–Hill House, McKinney, Texas, listed on the NRHP in Collin County, Texas
- W. R. Hill House, McKinney, Texas, listed on the NRHP in Collin County, Texas
- John B. Hill House, McKinney, Texas, listed on the NRHP in Collin County, Texas
- Moran Hill House, McKinney, Texas, listed on the NRHP in Collin County, Texas
- Hill–Howard House, Victoria, Texas, listed on the NRHP in Collin County, Texas
- Ira Hill House, Isle La Motte, Vermont
- Captain Timothy Hill House, Chincoteague Island, Virginia
- A. P. Hill Boyhood Home, Culpeper, Virginia
- Hill Mansion, Culpeper, Virginia
- Slaughter–Hill House, Culpeper, Virginia, (see also Slaughter-Hill Ranch in New Mexico)
- Samuel Hill House, Seattle, Washington, listed on the NRHP in King County, Washington

== See also ==
- The Haunting of Hill House (novel), by Shirley Jackson
- The Haunting of Hill House (TV series)
- Hill House School (disambiguation)
