= Intelligencer =

Intelligencer is an archaic word for a person who gathers intelligence, like a spy or secret agent. The term may refer to:

== Newspapers ==
- Daily Intelligencer (disambiguation), multiple papers
- Edwardsville Intelligencer (1862–present) Edwardsville, Illinois, US
- Illinois Intelligencer (1814–1832), earlier the Western Intelligencer, Kaskaskia and Vandalia, Illinois, US
- Intelligencer Journal (1794–present) Lancaster, Pennsylvania, US
- National Intelligencer (1800–1867) Washington, D.C., US
- Seattle Post-Intelligencer (1863–present) Seattle, Washington, US
- The Intelligencer, early name of The Advocate (Stamford) (1829–present) Stamford, Connecticut, US
- The Intelligencer and Wheeling News Register (1859–present) Wheeling, West Virginia, US
- The Pennsylvania Intelligencer, early name of The Patriot-News (1820–present) Harrisburg, Pennsylvania, US
- The Intelligencer (Doylestown, Pennsylvania) (1804–present) Doylestown, Pennsylvania, US
- The Intelligencer (Belleville), Belleville, Ontario, Canada

== Magazines ==
- The Gentleman's Magazine, or, Trader's Monthly Intelligencer (1731–1922)
- The English Intelligencer (1966–1968) poetry newsletter, UK
- The Mathematical Intelligencer (1979–present) New York, US
- Intelligencer (website), a website within New York magazine

== Other uses ==
- Informant
- Transatlantic Intelligencer

== See also ==
- The Intelligencer (disambiguation)
