= The Intelligencer =

The Intelligencer may refer to the following newspapers:

- The Intelligencer (Belleville), a daily newspaper published in Belleville, Ontario
- The Intelligencer (Doylestown, Pennsylvania) in Doylestown, Pennsylvania
- The Intelligencer, an 18th-century periodical launched by Jonathan Swift and Thomas Sheridan in 1728
- The Edwardsville Intelligencer, a daily newspaper published in Edwardsville, Illinois
- Ames Tribune, originally known as The Intelligencer
- Intelligencer (website), an offshoot of New York magazine
- The Intelligencer and Wheeling News-Register in Wheeling, West Virginia

== See also ==
- Intelligencer (disambiguation)
- Intelligence (disambiguation)
