= House on the Hill =

House on the Hill may refer to:

== Film and television ==
- House on the Hill (film), a 2012 American horror film
- The House on the Hill, a 1985 cartoon film released by the Seattle Fire Department
- The House on the Hill, a 1981 British television series

== Music ==
=== Albums ===
- The House on the Hill (album) or the title song, by Audience, 1971
- House on the Hill, by Modey Lemon, 2000
- House on the Hill, a mixtape by Ty Dolla Sign, 2011

=== Songs ===
- "House on the Hill", by The Pretty Reckless from Going to Hell, 2014
- "House on the Hill", by Beach House from Beach House, 2006
- "House on the Hill", by Gary Burton with Pat Metheny from Reunion, 1990
- "House on the Hill", by Kevin Coyne from Marjory Razorblade, 1973
- "House on the Hill", by Mud, 1969
- "House on the Hill", by Unknown Artist, competing to represent Ireland in the Eurovision Song Contest 1965
- "A House on the Hill", by Johnny Nash, 1961
- "The House on the Hill", by the Luvvers, 1966
- "The House on the Hill", by Stevie Wonder from For Once in My Life, 1968

== Other uses ==
- House on the Hill (card game), a solitaire variant
- The House on the Hill: A History of the Parliament of Western Australia 1832-1990, a 1991 book edited by David Black
- "The House on the Hill", a poem by Edwin Arlington Robinson included in his 1897 collection Children of the Night
- Weyerhaeuser House or House on the Hill, a historic building in Rock Island, Illinois, US

== See also ==
- Betrayal at House on the Hill, a 2004 board game
- A House on a Hill, a 2003 American film
- House on a Hill, a 2019 album by Amanda Lindsey Cook
- House on Hill, a 2006 album by Brad Mehldau
- Our House on the Hill, a 2012 album by the Babies
- Hill House (disambiguation)
