= The Hill School (disambiguation) =

The Hill School is a boarding school in Pottstown, Pennsylvania, United States.

The Hill School may also refer to:

- The Hill School (New Orleans), a private Waldorf school in Louisiana, United States
- The Hill School (Virginia), a private school in Middleburg, Virginia, United States
- The Hill School Of Fort Worth, a private school in Fort Worth, Texas, United States
- The Hill School, a school run by the Hill family at Bruce Castle in Tottenham, London, 1827–1891

== See also ==
- The Hill (disambiguation)
- Hill-Murray School, a private Catholic school in Maplewood, Minnesota, United States that was established via the amalgamation of Hill High School and Archbishop Murray Memorial High School
- School Hill, Wisconsin, an unincorporated community in Meeme, Manitowoc County, Wisconsin, United States
- School on the Hill (Romanian: Școala din deal) a school in Sighișoara, Romania
- Hill House School (disambiguation)
