= Timothy Hill =

Timothy or Tim or Timmy Hill may refer to:

- Tim Hill (politician) (born 1936), American politician in Washington state
- Tim Hill (filmmaker) (born 1958), American screenwriter and film director
- Tim Hill (basketball) (born 1976), American basketball player
- Timothy Hill (politician) (born 1981), member of the Tennessee House of Representatives
- Tim Hill (baseball) (born 1990), American baseball player
- Timmy Hill (born 1993), American racing driver
- Timothy Hill (murder victim) (died 1981), one of the victims in the Atlanta murders of 1979–1981

== See also ==
- Captain Timothy Hill House, a historic home located in Chincoteague Island, Accomack County, Virginia
