= Daily Intelligencer =

Daily Intelligencer may refer to:

- Daily Intelligencer (Atlanta) (1849–1871), a defunct newspaper of Atlanta, Georgia
- The Intelligencer (Belleville, Ontario), (est. 1834), also known as the Daily Intelligencer in the 1890s
- The Intelligencer (Doylestown, Pennsylvania)
- Daily Intelligencer (Harrisburg) (1841–1847), a defunct newspaper of Pennsylvania
- A predecessor of the Seattle Post-Intelligencer in Seattle, Washington
- A predecessor of The Intelligencer and Wheeling News Register in Ogden, West Virginia
- Intelligencer (website) or Daily Intelligencer, a blog within New York magazine

== See also ==
- Intelligencer (disambiguation)
