= Intel (disambiguation) =

Intel is an American semiconductor chip manufacturer.

Intel may also refer to:

- Intelligence assessment
- Intel, a fictional cartel in the 1960s BBC TV science fiction serials A for Andromeda and The Andromeda Breakthrough
- INTEL, a former Panamanian state-run telephone services company, purchased by Cable & Wireless plc in 1997
- Intelligence (information)
- Military intelligence
- Intelligence field

== See also ==
- Intelligence (disambiguation)
