= Intelligence (solitaire) =

- A Patience game
- Family: Fan
- Deck: Double 52-card

Intelligence is a Patience game which uses two decks of playing cards mixed together. It is basically a two-deck version of another solitaire game, La Belle Lucie, and its game play is somewhat closer to the parent game than its cousins House in the Wood and House on the Hill. As the name suggests, with intelligent play good players should be able to win about half of their games.

== Rules ==
First, 18 piles (or fans) of three cards are dealt. During this deal any ace encountered regardless of where it would end up in the pile will be moved to a foundation and be replaced with another card. As they become available, the other aces are placed on the foundations, which are all built up by suit.

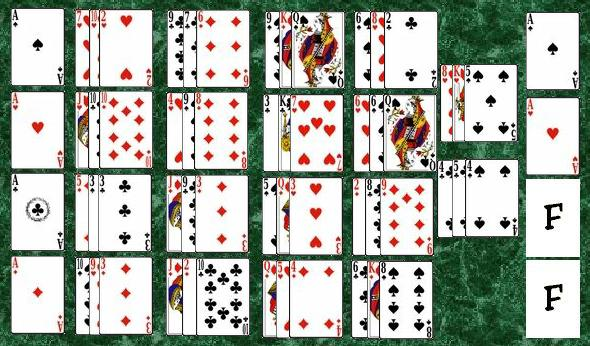
The initial layout in the game of Intelligence. Notice that during dealing, aces are separated are placed in the foundations, marked "F" in this diagram.

The top cards of the piles are available to be built on the foundations or on each other's piles on the tableau. When building on the tableau, the cards are built either up or down by suit. Aces cannot be placed over kings, however, and vice versa.

When a gap occurs, it is immediately filled by three new cards from the stock. This is the only way cards from the stock are introduced from the game and the only way spaces are refilled. As in the original deal, any ace that comes up is immediately placed on the foundations.

When all moves have been made and become stuck, even if there are still cards in the stock, the stock and all the cards in the tableau are gathered, reshuffled, and 18 piles of three cards each are redealt, or as many piles of three cards as the remaining ones can allow. This can be done twice and during both redeals as in the original deal, any aces the player encounters are immediately placed onto the foundations.

The game is won when all cards end up in the foundations.

== Variants ==
The version of the game described by Sloane Lee and Gabriel Packard slightly increases the number of tableau piles to 19, because they think this improves the game.
