= Three Shuffles and a Draw =

Solitaire game

Three Shuffles and a Draw is a solitaire game using one deck of playing cards. This game is similar to La Belle Lucie besides being able to draw one card after the second shuffle. The object of the game is to move all of the cards to the Foundations.

== Rules ==
Three Shuffles and a Draw has four foundations build up in suit from Ace to King, e.g. A♣, 2♣, 3♣, 4♣...

The Tableau is filled with eighteen piles containing three cards each, except for the last pile, only containing one card. These piles build down in suit, e.g. 8♥, 7♥, 6♥, 5♥...

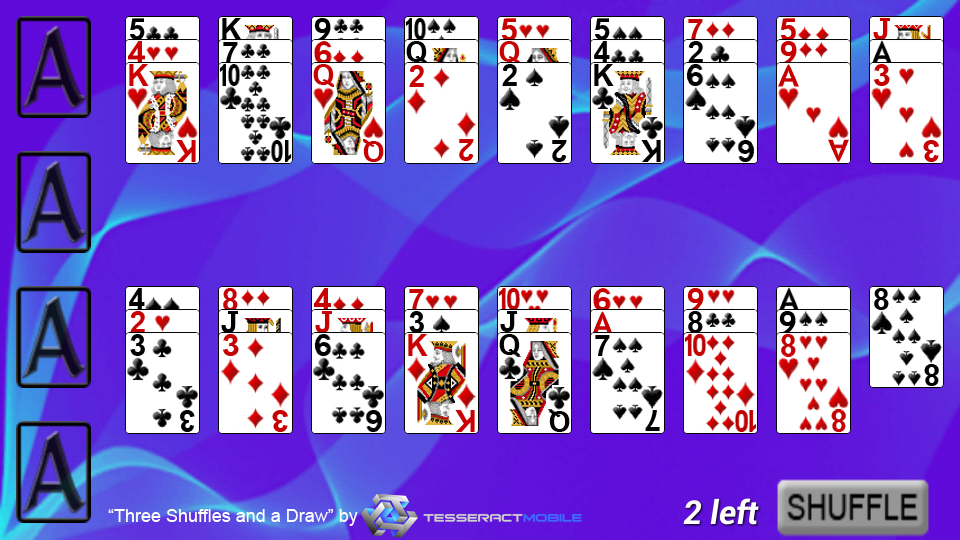
Three Shuffles and a Draw Layout

Only the top card in the tableau piles can be played, and these cards can move to other tableau piles or to the foundations. Empty spaces cannot be filled by any other card.

The name "Three Shuffles and a Draw" comes from the fact that there are 3 shuffles (counting the original starting shuffle plus the 2 redeals, and then a draw, where you can free any one single buried card).

The game is won after all cards have been moved to the foundations.

== See also ==
- La Belle Lucie
- List of solitaires
- Glossary of solitaire
