= Culpeper National Cemetery =

United States National Cemetery in Virginia

- U.S. National Register of Historic Places
- U.S. Historic district – Contributing property
- Virginia Landmarks Register
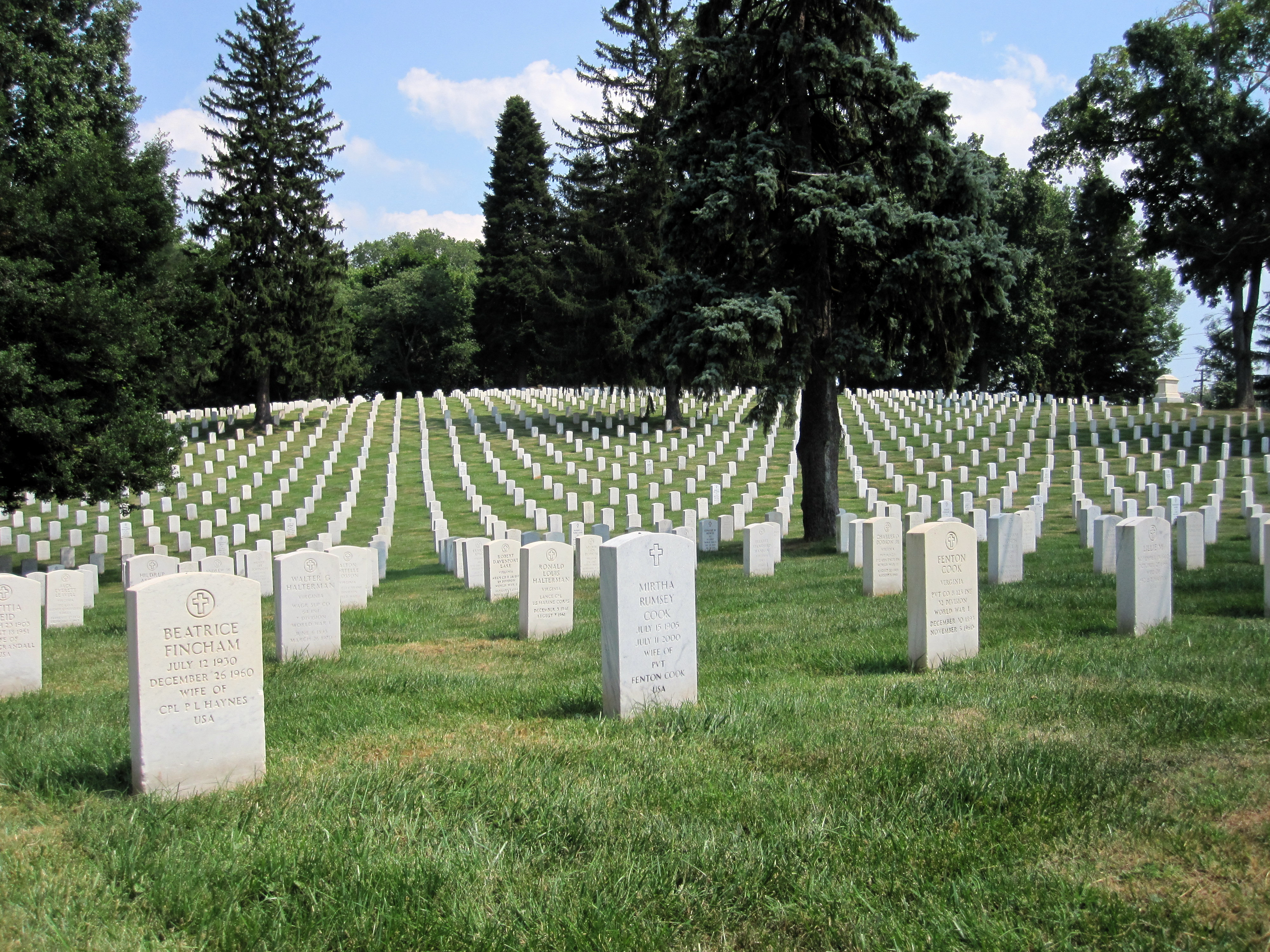
- Headstones at Culpeper National Cemetery

- Location within Virginia Location within the United States
- Location: 305 U.S. Ave., Culpeper, Virginia
- Coordinates: 38°28′11″N 77°59′30″W
- Area: 17.2 acres (7.0 ha)
- Built: 1866
- Architect: Meigs, Montgomery C.
- Architectural style: Second Empire
- MPS: Civil War Era National Cemeteries MPS
- NRHP reference No.: 96000029
- VLR No.: 204-0069

Significant dates
- Added to NRHP: February 26, 1996
- Designated VLR: October 18, 1995

VA interpretive sign about Culpeper National Cemetery

Culpeper National Cemetery is a United States National Cemetery located in the town of Culpeper, in Culpeper County, Virginia. Administered by the United States Department of Veterans Affairs, it encompasses 29.6 acres (120,000 m^{2}) of land, and as 2021, had over 14,000 interments.

== History ==
During the American Civil War, the territory around the city of Culpeper was defended vigorously by both sides, as it was a strategic point almost exactly between Washington D.C. and the capital of the Confederacy, Richmond, Virginia. Numerous battles took place in the region, including the Battle of Cedar Mountain and the Battle of Chancellorsville. The dead from those conflicts were buried nearby in makeshift grave sites. After the war a reburial program was initiated, and in 1867, Culpeper National Cemetery was established to reinter many of the remains from the makeshift sites.

The original cemetery comprised 6 acres (2.4 ha), bought from Edward B. Hill of Culpeper for $1,400. The original Second Empire Victorian caretakers lodge was built in 1872 and was designed by Montgomery C. Meigs. Many improvements to the grounds and facilities at the cemetery were made during the 1930s as part of the New Deal. These make-work improvements included replacing the original 1870s tool house at the cost of $8,000 in 1934, raising and realigning 912 headstones in May 1934, by the Civil Works Administration, and realignment and re-setting 402 headstones in 1936 though a Works Project Administration project.

Having operated without any major improvements since the 1930s, the cemetery was closed to new interments on November 17, 1972. On September 1, 1973, administration of the cemetery was transferred from the U.S. Army to the Veterans Administration's new National Cemetery System created by the National Cemetery Act of 1973. In 1975 another 10.5 acres (42,000 m^{2}) was donated by the Veterans of Foreign Wars, Burton–Hammond Post 2524, and in 2001 another plot of 12.3 acres (50,000 m^{2}) was purchased, which has been developed for future interments. The cemetery was reopened to interments on January 16, 1978.

Culpeper National Cemetery was listed in the National Register of Historic Places in 1996. It is included in the South East Street Historic District.

American Nazi Party founder George Lincoln Rockwell, who had served in the US Navy until his discharge in 1960, was to be buried at the cemetery after his assassination in 1967 but the cemetery refused to inter him after neo-Nazis who attended the service displayed Nazi insignia. Rockwell was later cremated instead.

== Notable monuments ==
- The states of Maine, Massachusetts, New York, Ohio, and Pennsylvania have erected markers dedicated to regiments from those states who had members die in the Battle of Cedar Mountain.
  - The Maine monument is of granite construction and is dedicated to the 22 officers and soldiers from the 10th Maine Volunteer Infantry who died at Cedar Mountain.
  - The Massachusetts monument was erected by members of the 2nd Massachusetts Infantry in 1893.
  - The New York monument was erected in 1902 to honor the members of the 28th New York Volunteer Infantry, 1st Brigade, 1st Division, 12th Corps, Army Corps of the Potomac who died at Cedar Mountain.
  - The Ohio monument is of granite and bronze construction and was erected by the 7th Ohio Regimental Association.
  - The Pennsylvania monument was erected in 1910.
- The Armed Forces Monument was erected November 1992 and was sponsored by the American Legion Post 330 and Veterans of Foreign Wars Post 2524. The monument was officially dedicated May 28, 2001.
- A memorial to all of the unknown burials from the Civil War was erected in 1988 by the Veterans of Foreign Wars, Burton–Hammond Post 2524.
- The seven and a half feet tall National Military Cemetery monument constructed from a cast iron seacoast artillery tube.

== Gallery ==
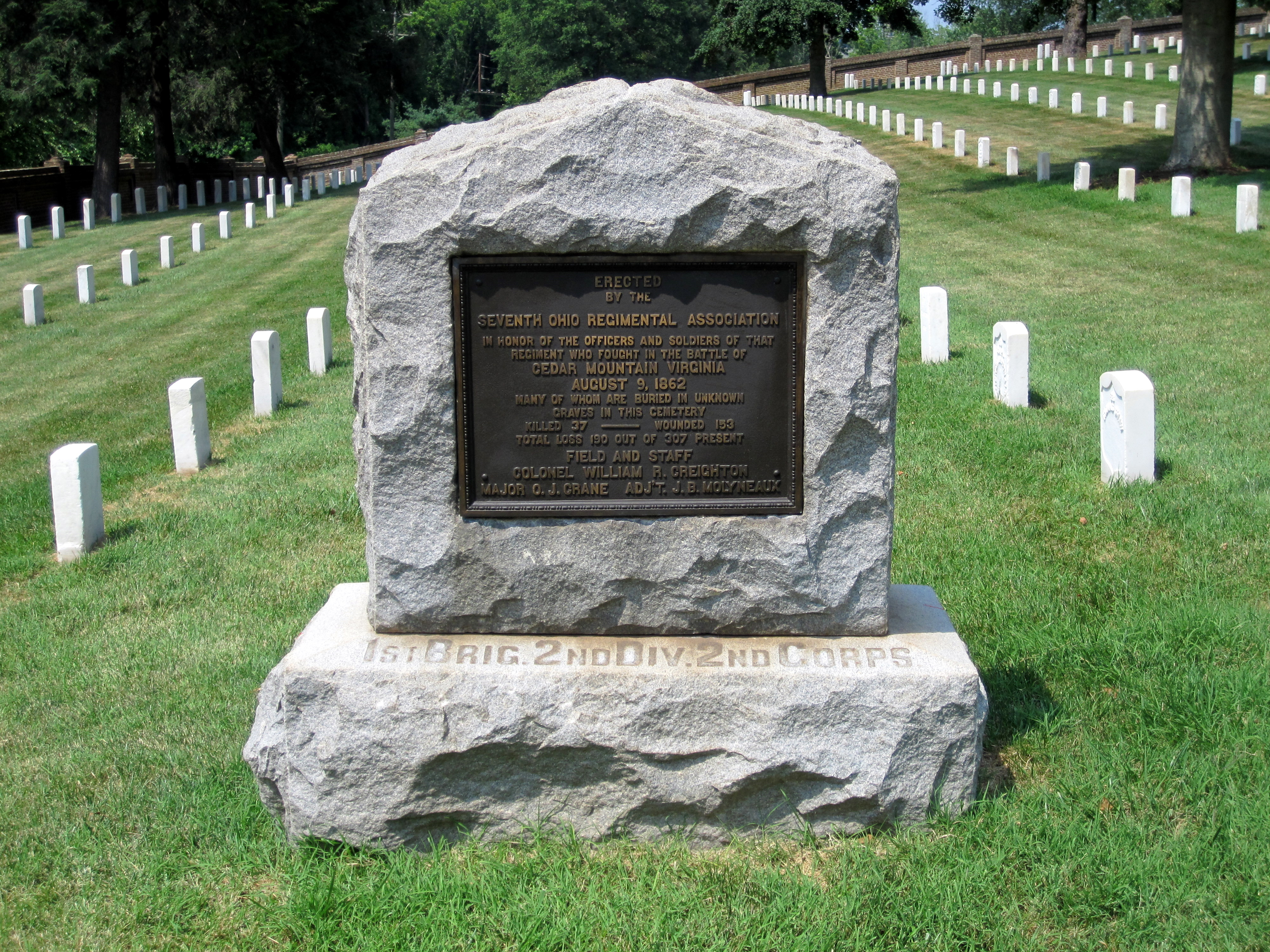
Seventh Ohio Regimental Association Memorial

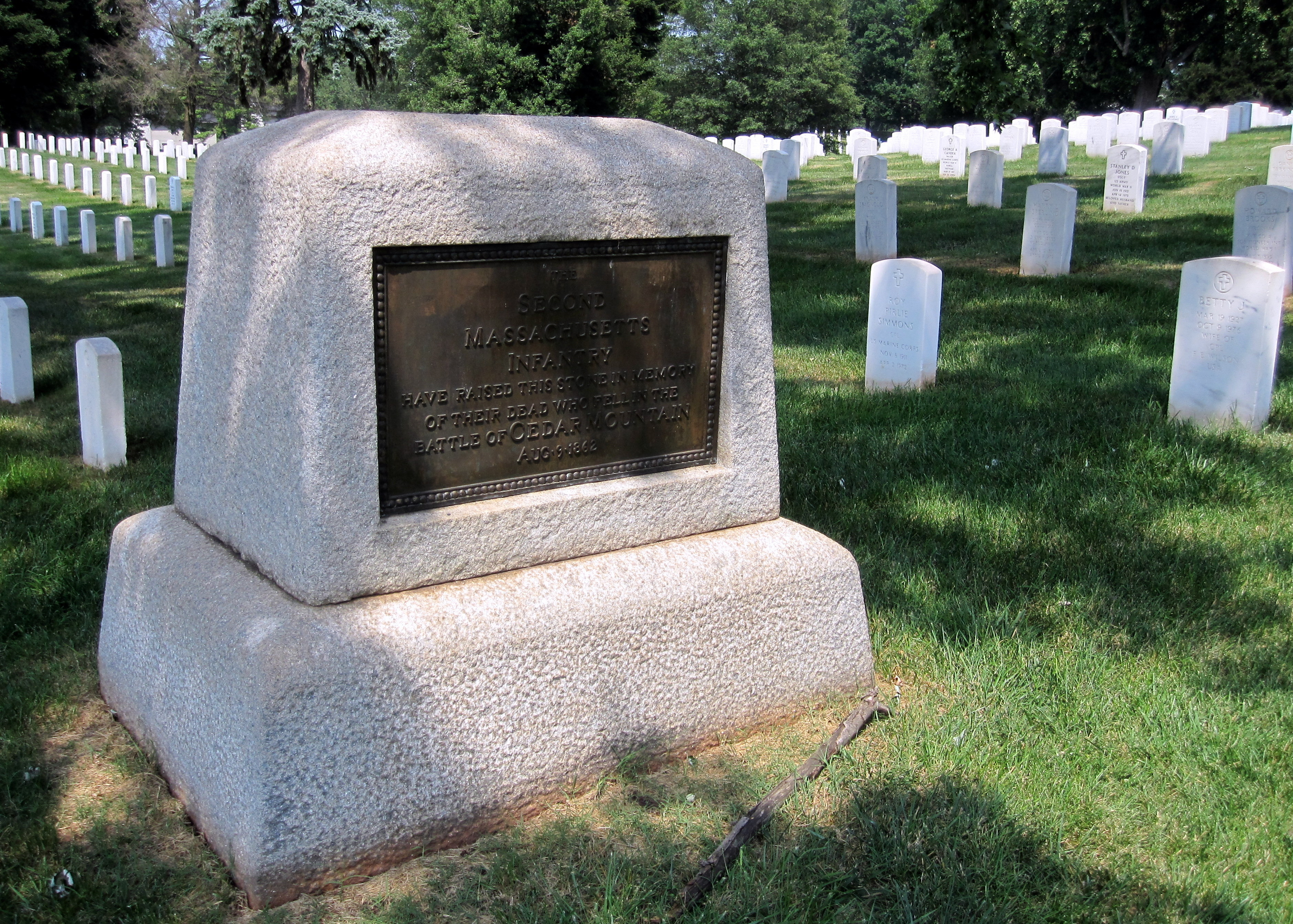
Memorial erected by the Second Massachusetts Infantry

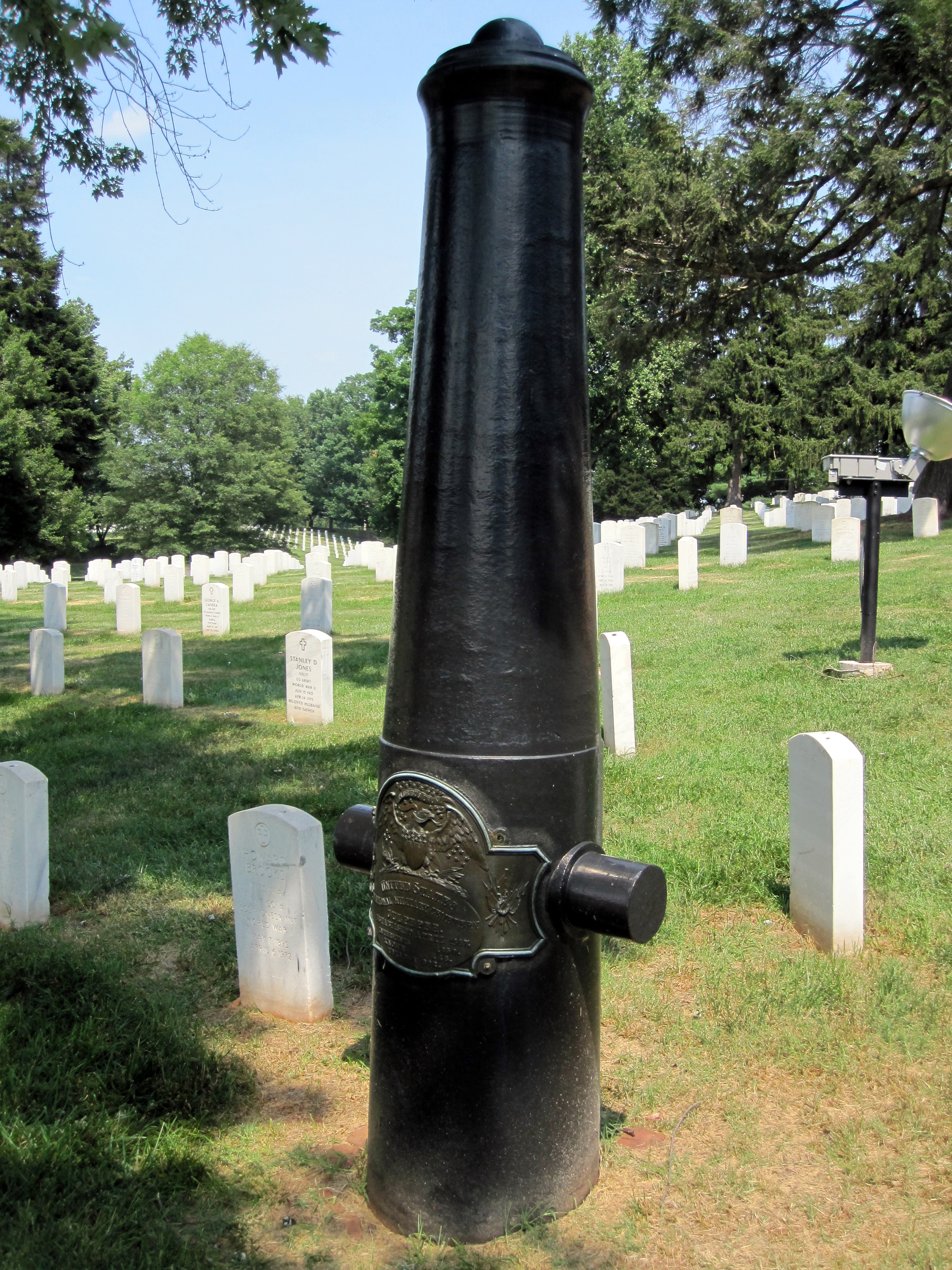
A National Military Cemetery monument

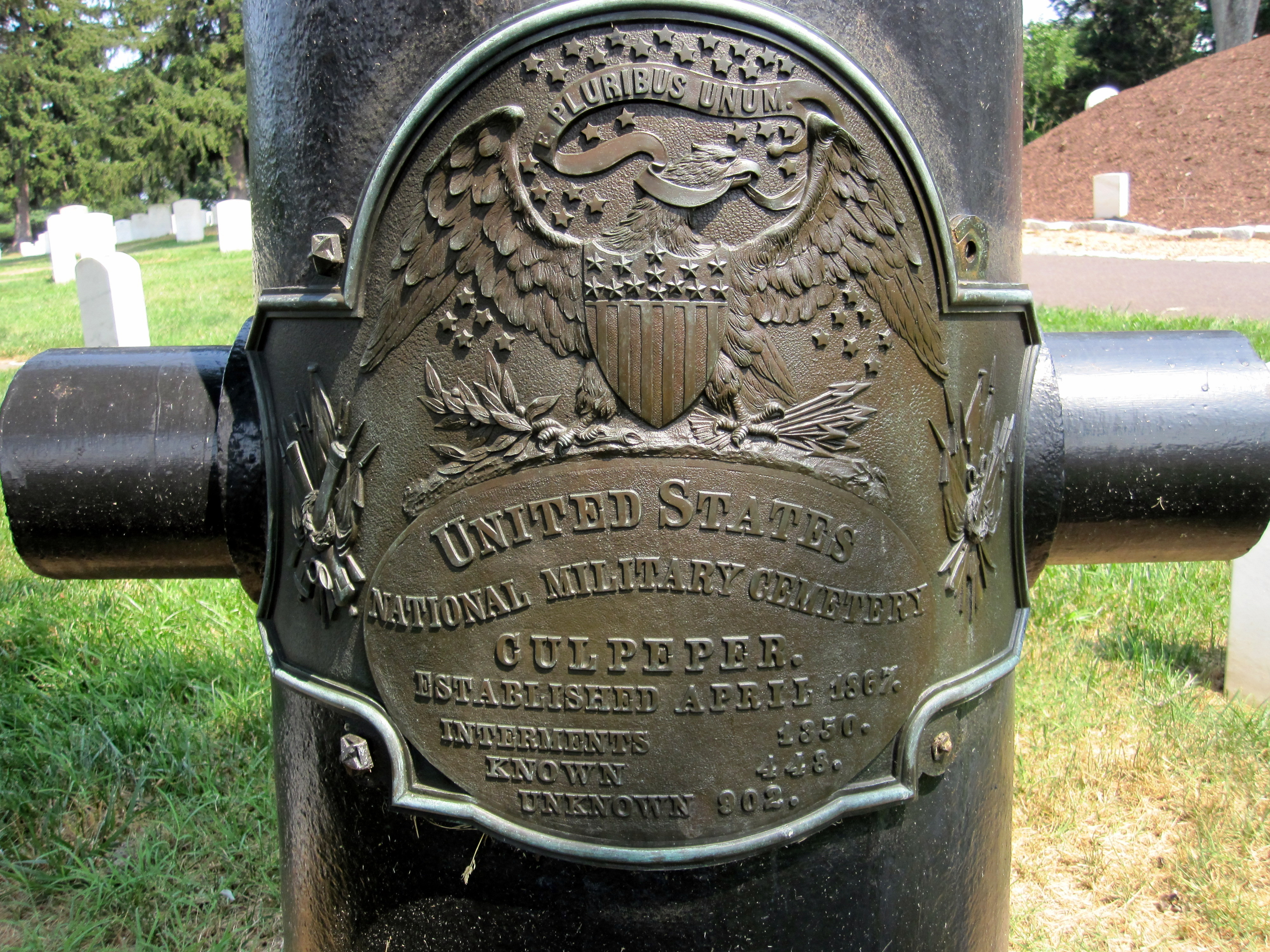
Close-up of plaque on the National Military Cemetery monument

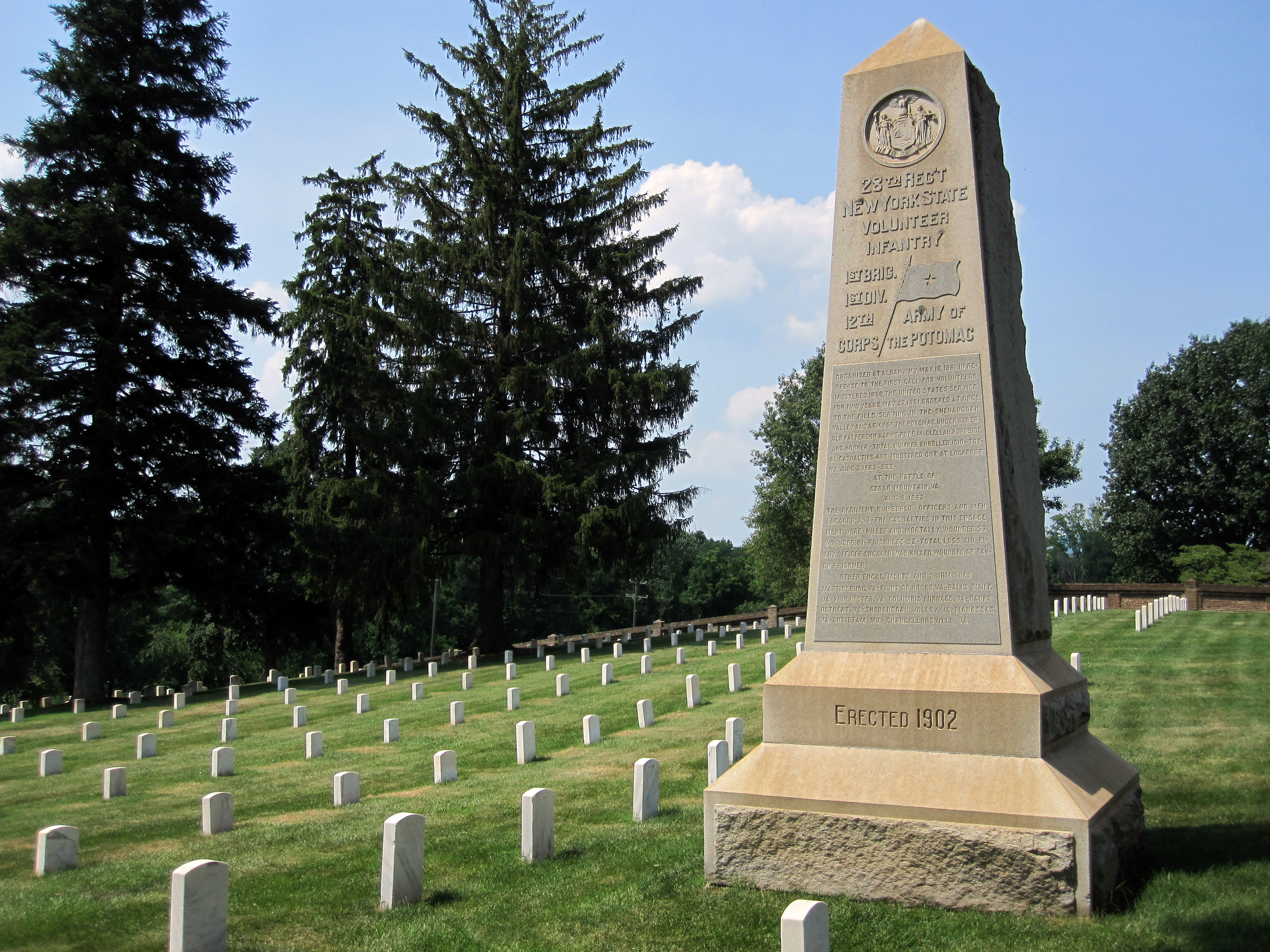
Twenty-eighth Regiment, New York Volunteer Infantry Memorial

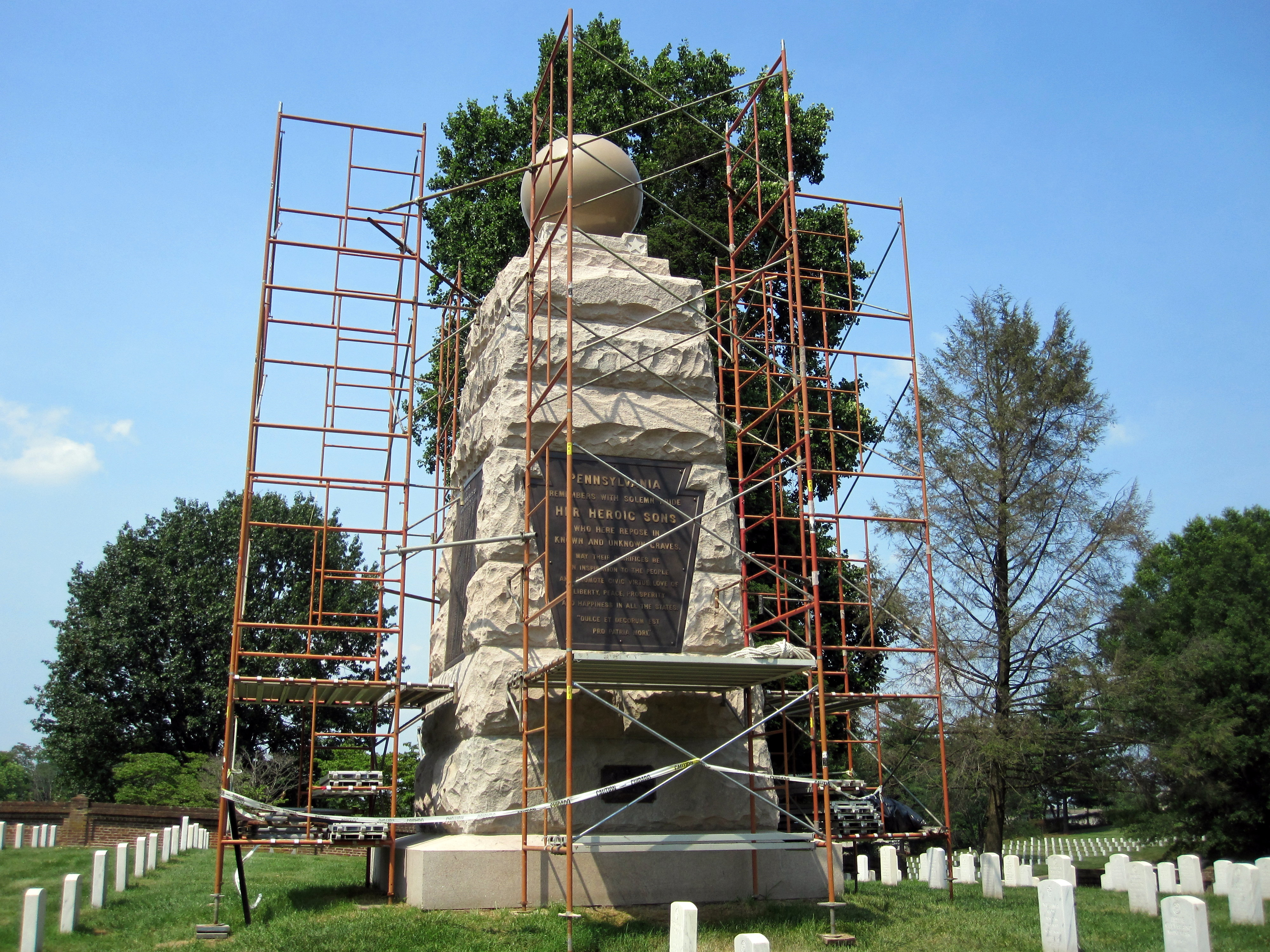
Pennsylvania Memorial undergoing restoration in 2010

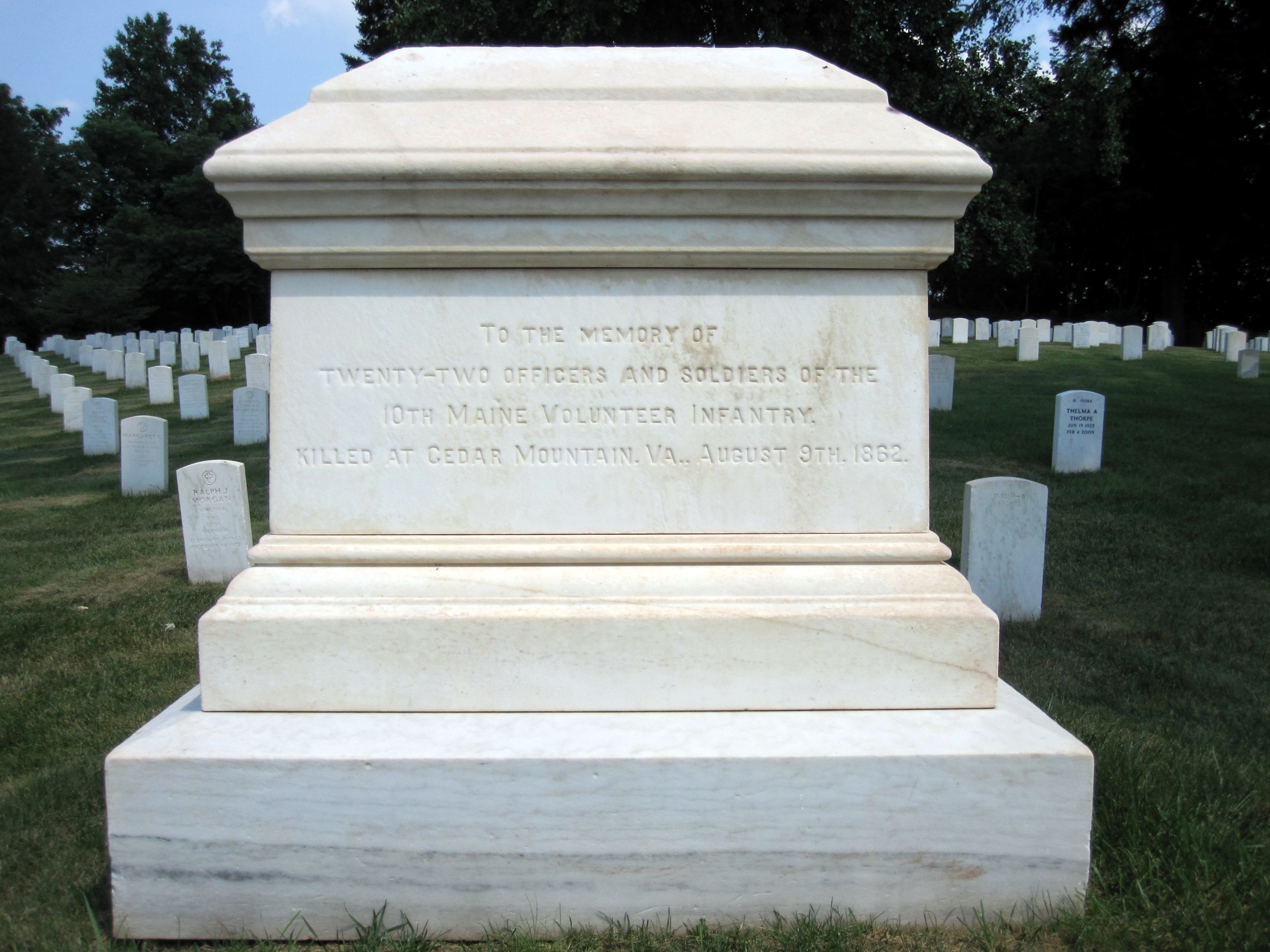
Tenth Maine Volunteer Infantry Memorial

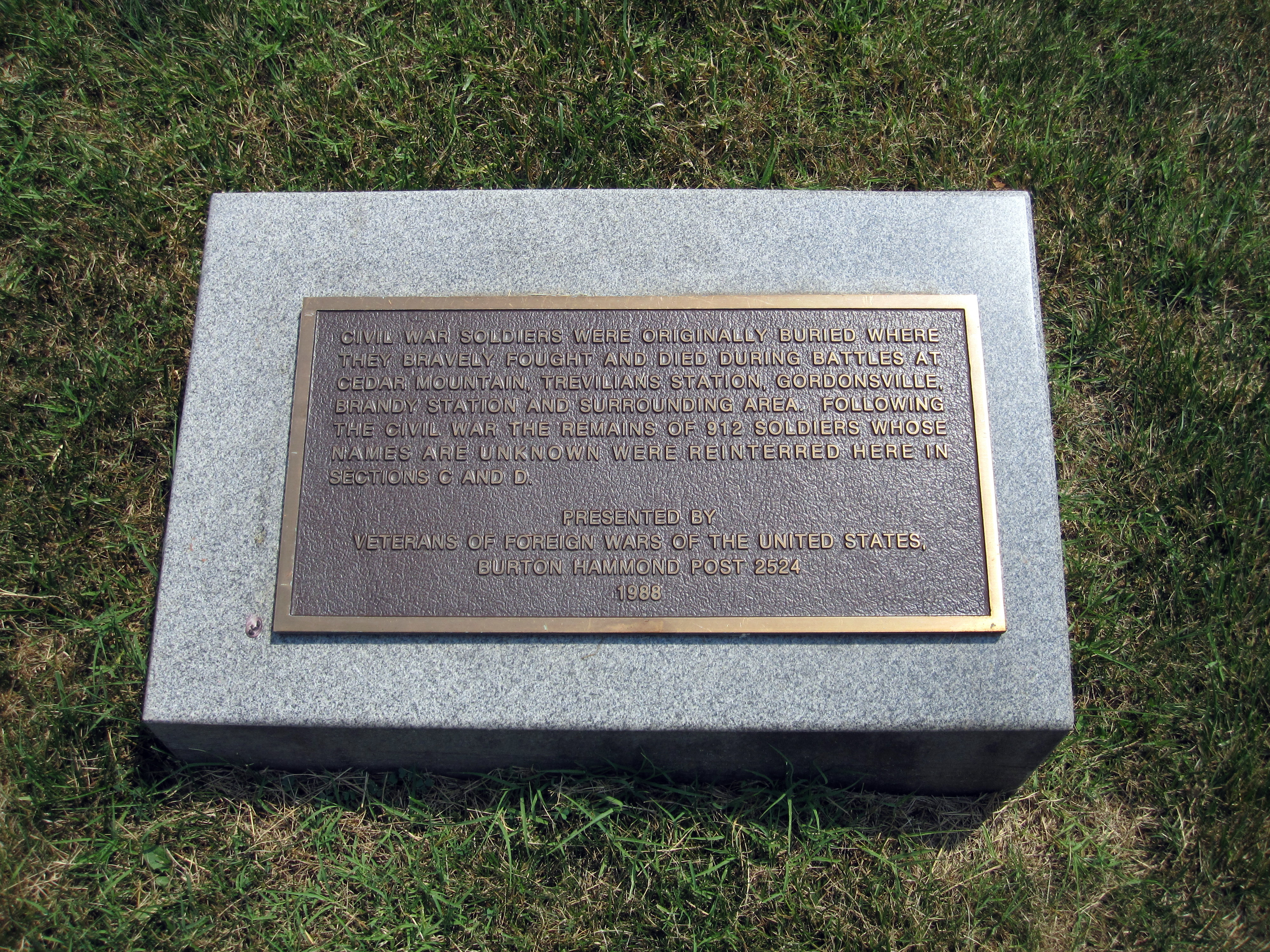
Plaque commemorating unknown Civil War reinterments in sections C and D, erected in 1988
