= Bristol (card game) =

Solitaire card game

- A Patience game
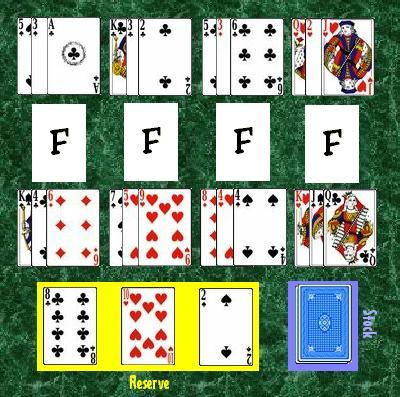
- Initial layout
- Origin: US
- Named variants: Belvedere
- Type: Half-open packer
- Family: Fan
- Deck: Single 52-card
- Playing time: 8 min
- Odds of winning: 1 in 4

Bristol is a Patience game using a deck of 52 playing cards. It is a fan-type game in the style of La Belle Lucie. It has an unusual feature of building regardless of suit on both the foundations and on the tableau; it is also one of the easiest to win. It was invented by Morehead & Mott-Smith around 1950.

== Rules ==
Eight piles (or fans) of three cards each are dealt onto the tableau. Any king that is not on the bottom of its pile is placed underneath. Then three cards are placed under these piles. These form the bases for the three reserve piles.

Whenever an ace becomes available, it becomes a foundation, on which it can be built up regardless of suit up to a King. The same is done on the three other aces.

The top card of each pile on the tableau and the top card of each reserve pile is available to be built on the foundations and around the tableau. Like the foundations, the piles on the tableau are built down regardless of suit. Only one card can be moved at a time and when a pile becomes empty, it is never filled.

Cards in the stock are dealt onto the reserve three at a time, one for each pile. In effect, gaps on the reserve are filled during the deal; therefore, when a reserve pile becomes empty, it is not filled until the next batch of three cards is dealt.

The game is won when all cards end up in the foundations. Considering that all building is done regardless of suit, the chance of achieving this is very high.

== Variations ==
Belvedere is played exactly the same as Bristol except for one rule: an Ace is separated from the deck at the beginning of the game and immediately set up as a foundation.

== See also ==
- La Belle Lucie
- List of patiences and solitaires
- Glossary of patience and solitaire terms

== Bibliography ==
- Arnold, Peter (2011). Card Games for One. 2nd edn. London: Chambers.
- Parlett, David (1979). The Penguin Book of Patience. London: Penguin. ISBN 0-7139-1193-X
