= South East Street Historic District =

Historic district in Virginia, United States

- U.S. National Register of Historic Places
- U.S. Historic district
- Virginia Landmarks Register
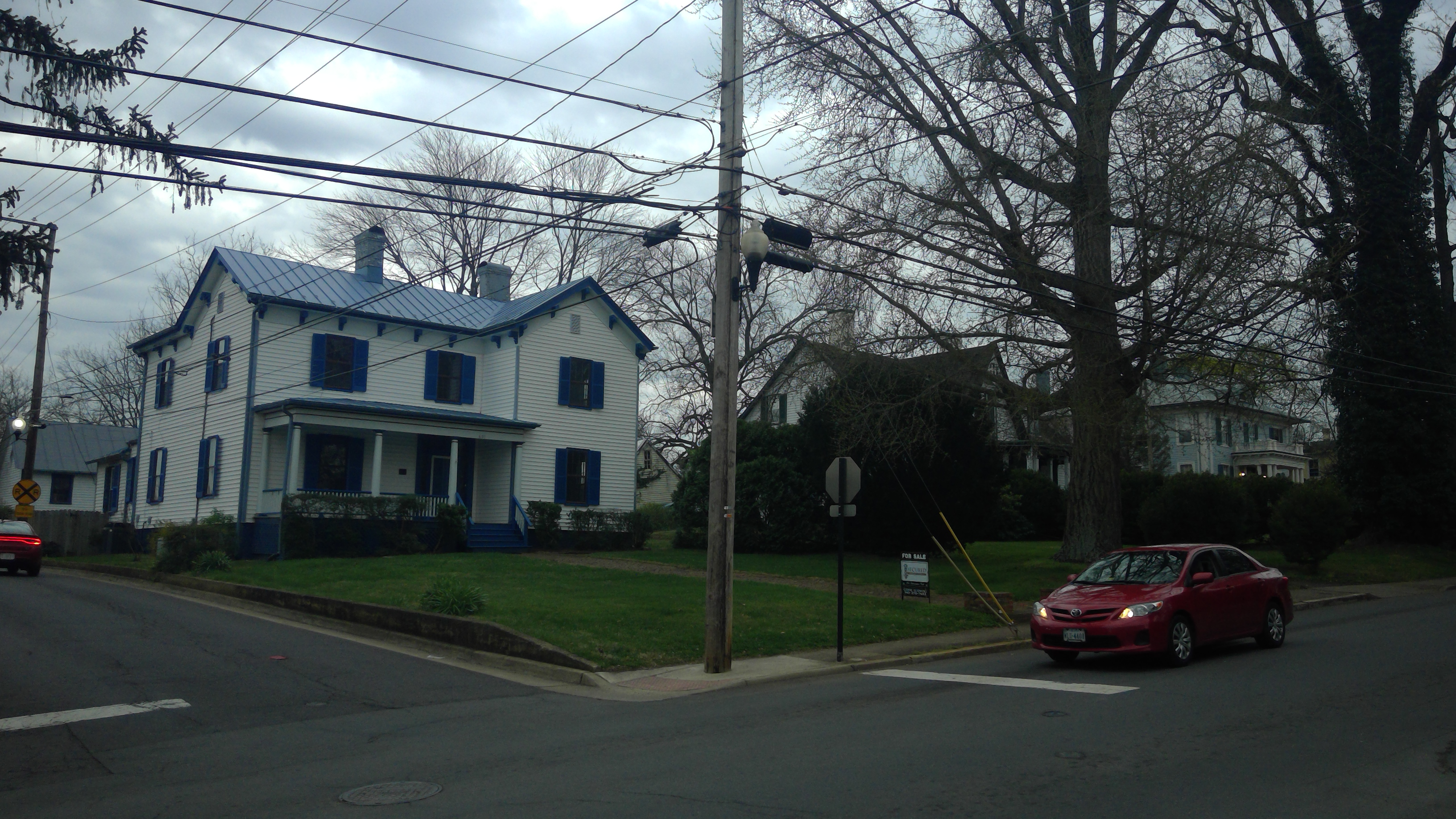
- Houses in the district, April 2017

- Location within Virginia Location within the United States
- Location: S. E., E. Asher, E. Chandler, and Page Sts., and Culpeper National Cemetery, Culpeper, Virginia
- Coordinates: 38°28′09″N 77°59′46″W
- Area: 30.3 acres (12.3 ha)
- Built: 1853
- Architect: Moore, Philip Tazewell; Meigs, Montgomery C.
- Architectural style: Federal, Mid 19th Century Revival, Eclectic
- NRHP reference No.: 09000663
- VLR No.: 204-0064

Significant dates
- Added to NRHP: August 27, 2009
- Designated VLR: June 18, 2009

South East Street Historic District is a national historic district located at Culpeper, Culpeper County, Virginia. It encompasses 76 contributing buildings in a residential section of the town of Culpeper. The earliest houses date to the 1830s-1840s, with most built after 1870. Notable buildings include the late Federal-style "Episcopal Rectory" (c. 1835), Old Hill House (c. 1840), Lawrence-Payne-Chelf House (1852), Old Waite House (1870-1871), and Crimora Waite House. Also located in the district are the separately listed Hill Mansion and Culpeper National Cemetery.

It was listed on the National Register of Historic Places in 2009.
