= Hill House School (disambiguation) =

Hill House School is a preparatory day school in London, England.

Hill House School may also refer to:

- Hill House School, a school in Hampshire, England, see List of schools in Hampshire#Special and alternative schools
- Hill House School, South Yorkshire, England
- Hill House Kindergarten, Amman, Jordan
- Hillhouse High School, Connecticut, United States

== See also ==
- The Hill School (disambiguation)
- Hill House (disambiguation)
