= Intelligence (disambiguation) =

Intelligence is the ability to perceive, collect, or infer information, retain it, and make decisions based on that information.

Intelligence or intelligent may refer to:

== Disciplines ==
- The intelligence field, which is concerned with intelligence (information), and its subfields:
  - The intelligence cycle, and its phases:
    - Intelligence analysis
    - Intelligence assessment
    - Espionage, (intelligence gathering)
  - Business intelligence, for business analysis purposes
  - Military intelligence, a military discipline using information collection and analysis
  - Strategic intelligence, information collection and analysis the national and international level to include non-military organizations
  - Human intelligence (intelligence gathering)
  - Geospatial intelligence
  - Signals intelligence

== Organizations ==
- Intelligence agency
- Police intelligence, an element of the British police

== Human capacities ==
- Human intelligence
- Emotional intelligence
- Social intelligence

== Arts, entertainment and media ==
=== Music ===
- "Intelligence", a song by ...And You Will Know Us by the Trail of Dead from the 2003 EP The Secret of Elena's Tomb
- The Intelligence, an American rock band
- Intelligence, an opera with libretto by Gene Scheer
- Intelligent dance music
- "Intelligence" a song by Is0Kenny

=== Literature ===
- Intelligence (journal), a scientific journal dealing with intelligence and psychometrics
- Intelligence (newspaper), an Australian newspaper

=== Television ===
- Intelligence (Canadian TV series), 2006–2007
- Intelligence (American TV series), 2014
- Intelligence (British TV series), 2020
- Inttelligent, a 2018 Indian Telugu-language film
- "Intelligence" (Spy in the Wild), a 2017 documentary episode

=== Games ===
- Intelligence (solitaire), a card game

== See also ==
- Artificial intelligence (disambiguation)
  - Artificial intelligence, also called machine intelligence
- Intellect (disambiguation)
- Nous, sometimes equated to intellect or intelligence
