= Hill Farm (Beebe, Arkansas) =

Historic house in Arkansas, United States

- U.S. National Register of Historic Places
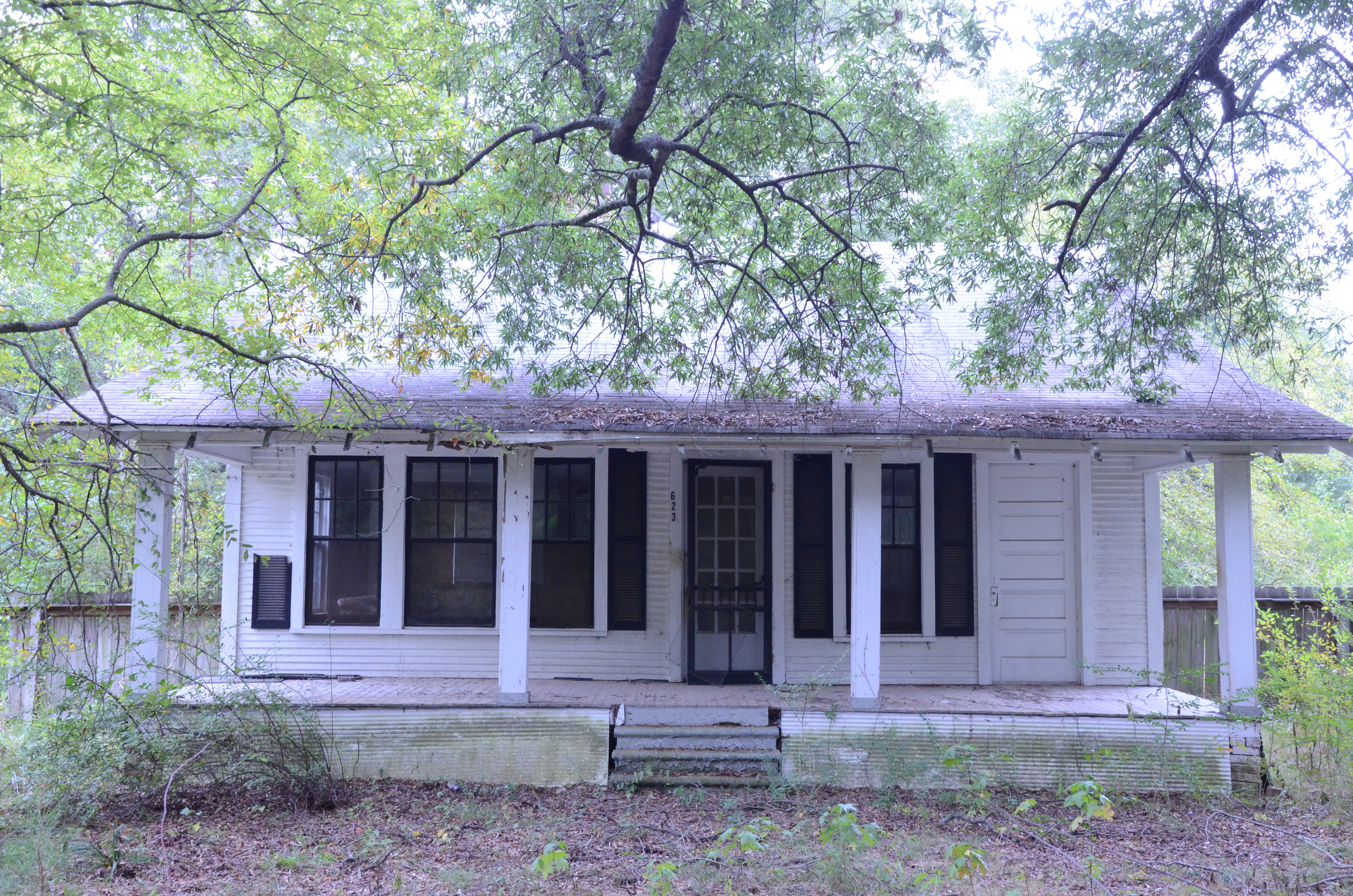

- Location within Arkansas Location within the United States
- Nearest city: Beebe, Arkansas
- Coordinates: 35°3′37″N 91°56′42″W
- Area: less than one acre
- Built: 1928
- Architectural style: Bungalow/craftsman
- MPS: White County MPS
- NRHP reference No.: 91001258
- Added to NRHP: July 21, 1992

The Hill Farm is a historic farmhouse in rural White County, Arkansas. It is located on the east side of County Road 6, just southwest of the Beebe city limits. It is a single story wood-frame structure, with a side gable roof, and a porch across the front and rear with a shed roof supported by square box columns. Built in 1928, it is a well-preserved example of a Craftsman house in a rural setting.

The house was listed on the National Register of Historic Places in 1992.

== See also ==
- National Register of Historic Places listings in White County, Arkansas
