= Gov. John F. Hill Mansion =

Historic house in Maine, United States

- U.S. National Register of Historic Places
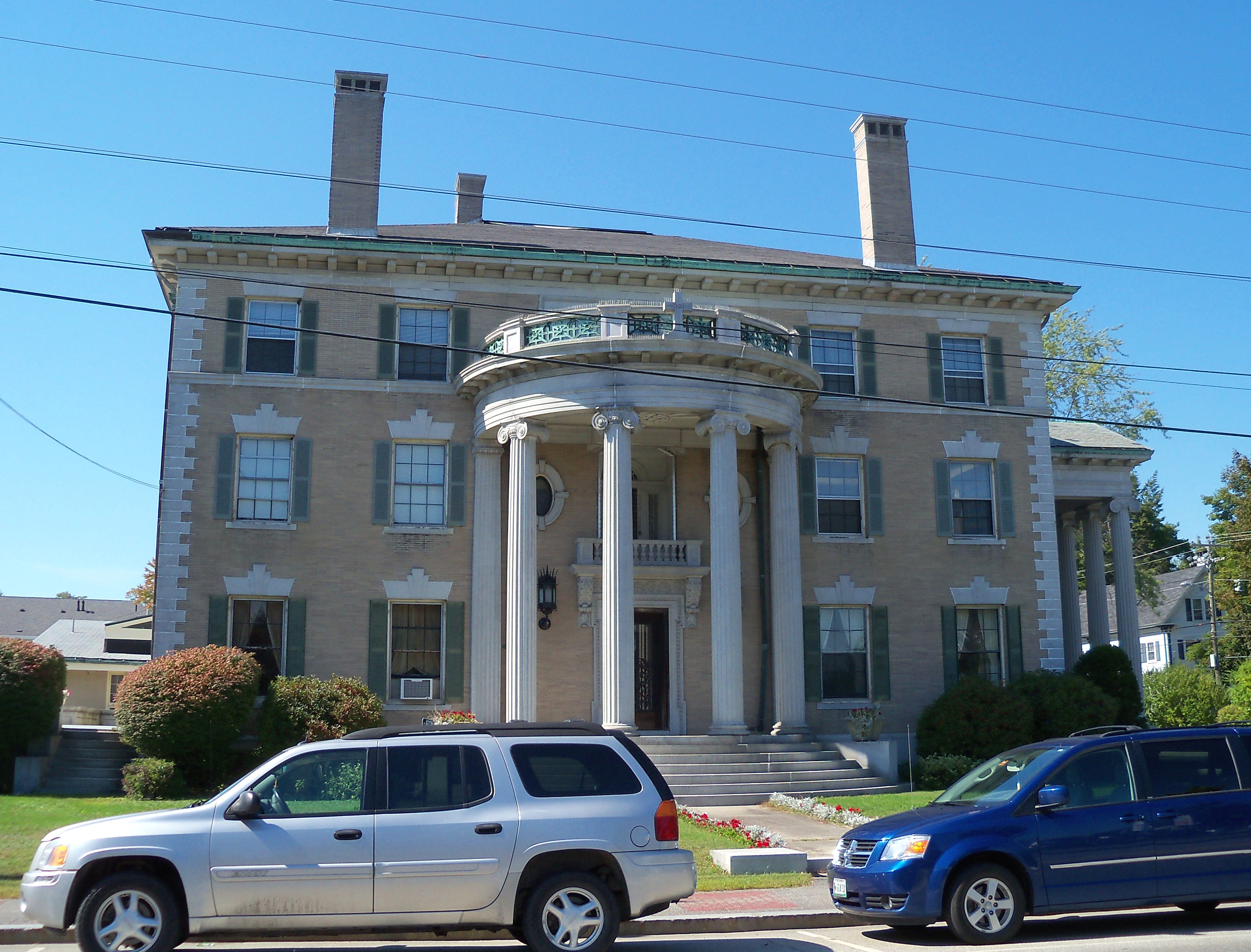

- Location within Maine Location within the United States
- Location: 136 State St., Augusta, Maine
- Coordinates: 44°18′45″N 69°46′44″W
- Area: 2 acres (0.81 ha)
- Built: 1901
- Architect: John Calvin Stevens
- Architectural style: Colonial Revival
- NRHP reference No.: 77000070
- Added to NRHP: November 21, 1977

The Governor Hill Mansion is a historic house at 136 State Street in Augusta, Maine. It was built in 1901 for John F. Hill to a design by John Calvin Stevens, and is one of the state's grandest examples of Colonial Revival architecture. It now serves as an event facility. It was listed on the National Register of Historic Places in 1977.

== Description and history ==
The Hill Mansion stands at the southwest corner of State and Green Streets, between Augusta's downtown area and the state capitol complex. It is a large three-story masonry building, built out of yellow brick with granite trim and a granite foundation. Its roof has a projecting cornice with modillions, and its corners have granite quoins. Windows are generally sash set in rectangular openings, with granite sills and keystoned lintels. A beltcourse of stone separates the second and third floors. The dominating feature of its east-facing facade is a two-story semi-circular portico, supported by Ionic columns and topped by a low balcony. The north facade has a temple-fronted porte cochere, also two stories in height, with a full entablature and fully pedimented gable. The interior retains well preserved original high-style decorative elements.

The house was designed by John Calvin Stevens, Maine's highest profile architect of the period, and was built in 1901 for John F. Hill, who was then Governor of Maine. Hill was a prominent businessman with interests in publishing and electric companies, prior to his entry into politics. He had this house built in part as a suitable executive mansion, the state not yet having acquired The Blaine House for that purpose. Hill's children donated the property to the Catholic Oblate Fathers order. After ownership passed through several Catholic organizations, it was sold into private ownership in 2009, and is now used as an event facility and office space.

== See also ==
- National Register of Historic Places listings in Kennebec County, Maine
