= Moore–Hill House =

Historic house in Massachusetts, United States

- U.S. National Register of Historic Places
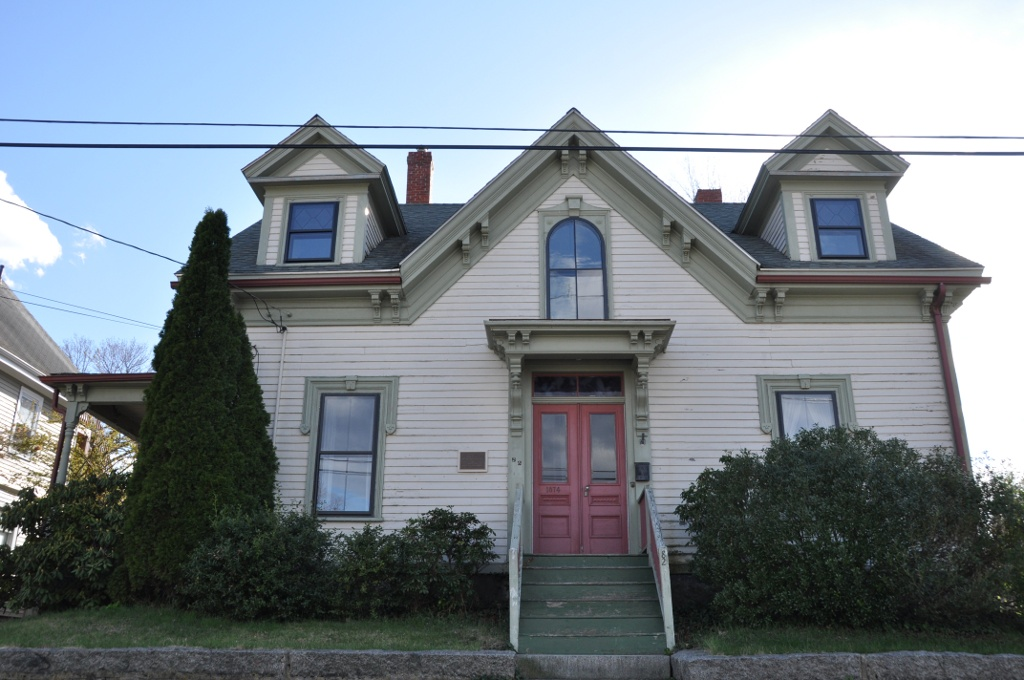

- Location within Massachusetts Location within the United States
- Location: 82 Franklin Street, Peabody, Massachusetts
- Coordinates: 42°31′41″N 70°56′7″W
- Built: 1874
- Architectural style: Italianate, Gothic Revival
- NRHP reference No.: 88000704
- Added to NRHP: June 9, 1988

The Moore–Hill House is a historic house in Peabody, Massachusetts. It is an excellent example of a Gothic Victorian house, built in 1874 for W. H. Hill. The 1 1/2-story wood-frame building has a cross gable roof line, with the main roof line running crosswise. The front cornice, including the central front gable section, is decorated with paired brackets (a typical Italianate decoration), and the front windows have decorative surrounds. The front door is centrally located and sheltered by an ornate entablature, above which is a round-arched window.

The house was listed on the National Register of Historic Places in 1988.

== See also ==
- National Register of Historic Places listings in Essex County, Massachusetts
