= Waldorf School of New Orleans =

Coordinates: 29°58′38.5″N 90°4′33.5″W

Location
- 2539 Columbus St. New Orleans, Louisiana 70119

Information
- School type: Waldorf, Private, Preschool, Elementary, Middle
- Established: 2000
- Founder: Suzanne Hill
- Grades: Preschool through 8th grade, and Child Care
- Website: https://www.waldorfnola.org/

Waldorf School of New Orleans (formerly The Hill School) is a private school based on the Waldorf philosophy. Founded in 2000, Waldorf School of New Orleans offers a developmentally appropriate, experiential approach to education, integrating the arts and academics for children from preschool through 8th grade. In 2005, the school's buildings were flooded in Hurricane Katrina.

== Curriculum ==
The school's curriculum is based on the philosophies of Rudolf Steiner who was a contemporary of Maria Montessori. Both Waldorf and Montessori sound similar on paper, but are actually opposites in some ways. Waldorf pays tribute to each developmental stage of childhood and protects the "fantasy stage" of early childhood above all (until the child is developmentally ready for academic learning), while Montessori aims to pull children out of that fantasy and show them the ways of the real world. Waldorf educates the "whole child" and includes course work in eurythmy, handwork (i.e., knitting and sewing), and music. Waldorf education is based on the view of the human being described in anthroposophy.

== History ==
Waldorf School of New Orleans (formerly The Hill School) was founded in 2000 by a small group of parents who felt Waldorf education was an imperative educational experience meant for their children. The school had been enjoying steady and healthy growth since its inception and had grown 50 students strong, but when Hurricane Katrina struck on August 29, 2005, the school was devastated. Not only was its location flooded and its student body scattered across the nation, but upon homecoming, enrollment deflated to less than half what it was. Once again a group of steadfast parents decided to press on. They found a new location in the Irish Channel and reopened. In 2016 WNSO bought its first property at 2010 Peniston St, New Orleans, La 70119 and opened an Early Childhood Center. In August 2019 the school moved it Main Campus to 2539 Columbus St., New Orleans, LA, 70119, as a part of the Rose Collaborative in the newly renovated school building behind the former St. Rose de Lima Church.

== School leadership ==
Waldorf School of New Orleans' governance is a system of shared responsibility. The school is governed by three leadership groups: Faculty, Board, and Administration. Each of these groups has distinct responsibilities and strives for consensus on major policy decisions. This system of shared governance supports the development of a strong, healthy community from which students learn and grow.

All teachers at Waldorf School of New Orleans are either Waldorf-certified or are earning their certification.

== See also ==
- Curriculum of the Waldorf schools
- Waldorf school alumni
