= Matt N. Hill Homestead Barn =

- U.S. National Register of Historic Places
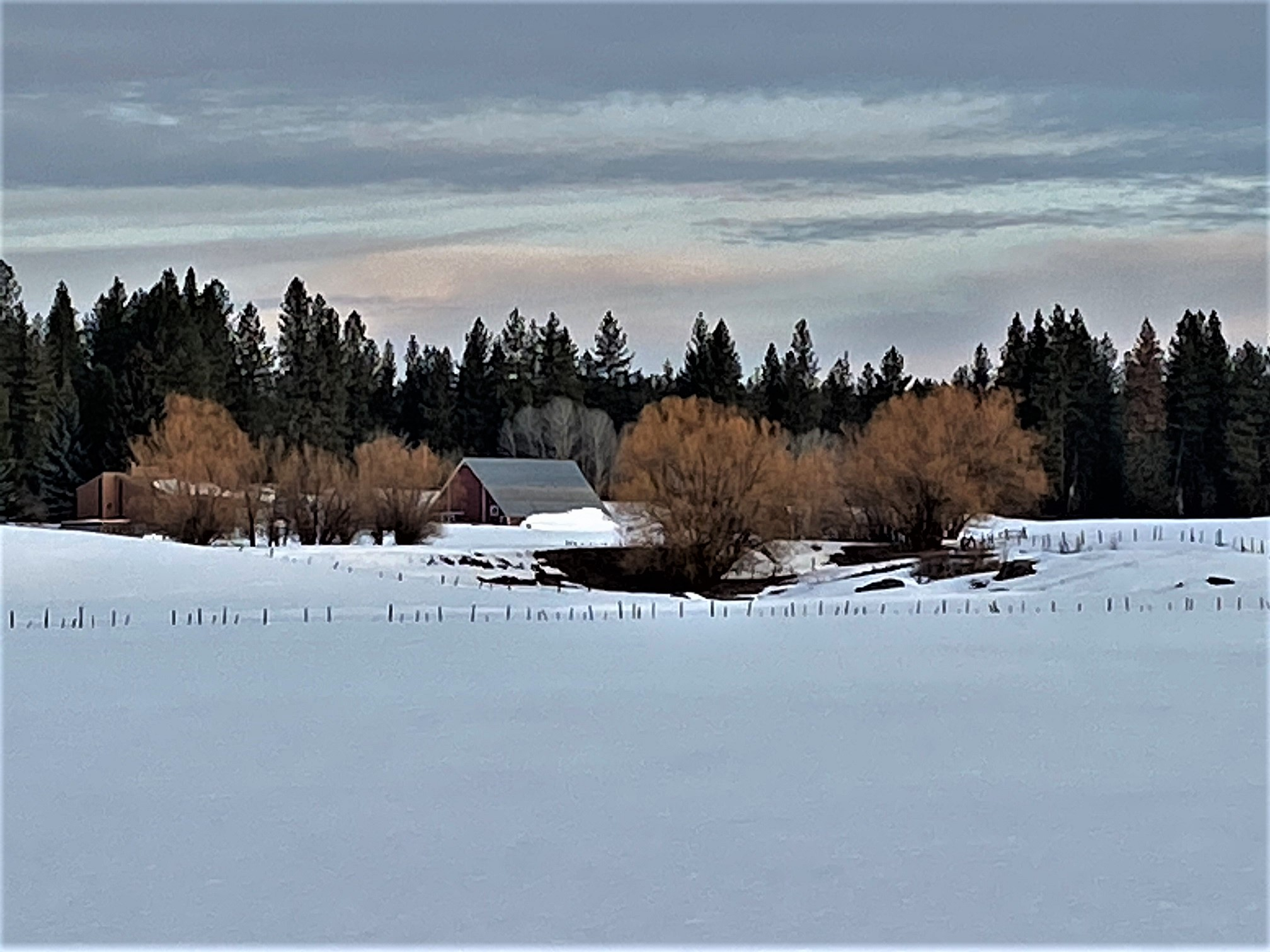
- Barn as seen from a Ely Road in 2021

- Location within Idaho Location within the United States
- Location: Southeast of McCall, Idaho
- Coordinates: 44°53′2″N 116°3′26″W
- Area: 2.5 acres (1.0 ha)
- Built: c.1903
- Architectural style: Finnish Homestead Barn
- MPS: Long Valley Finnish Structures TR
- NRHP reference No.: 82000362
- Added to NRHP: November 17, 1982

The Matt N. Hill Homestead Barn near McCall, Idaho was built in about 1903. It was listed on the National Register of Historic Places in 1982.

It is a basilica plan barn which is 50 by 60 feet (15 m × 18 m) in plan. It has a steep roof and a pointed hay hood.

In 1980 the barn was in very good condition and was used for storing farm equipment. Its roof shingles had been replaced by a metal roof, but its interior was virtually unchanged from its original status.
