= Abraham Hill House =

Historic house in Massachusetts, United States

- U.S. National Register of Historic Places
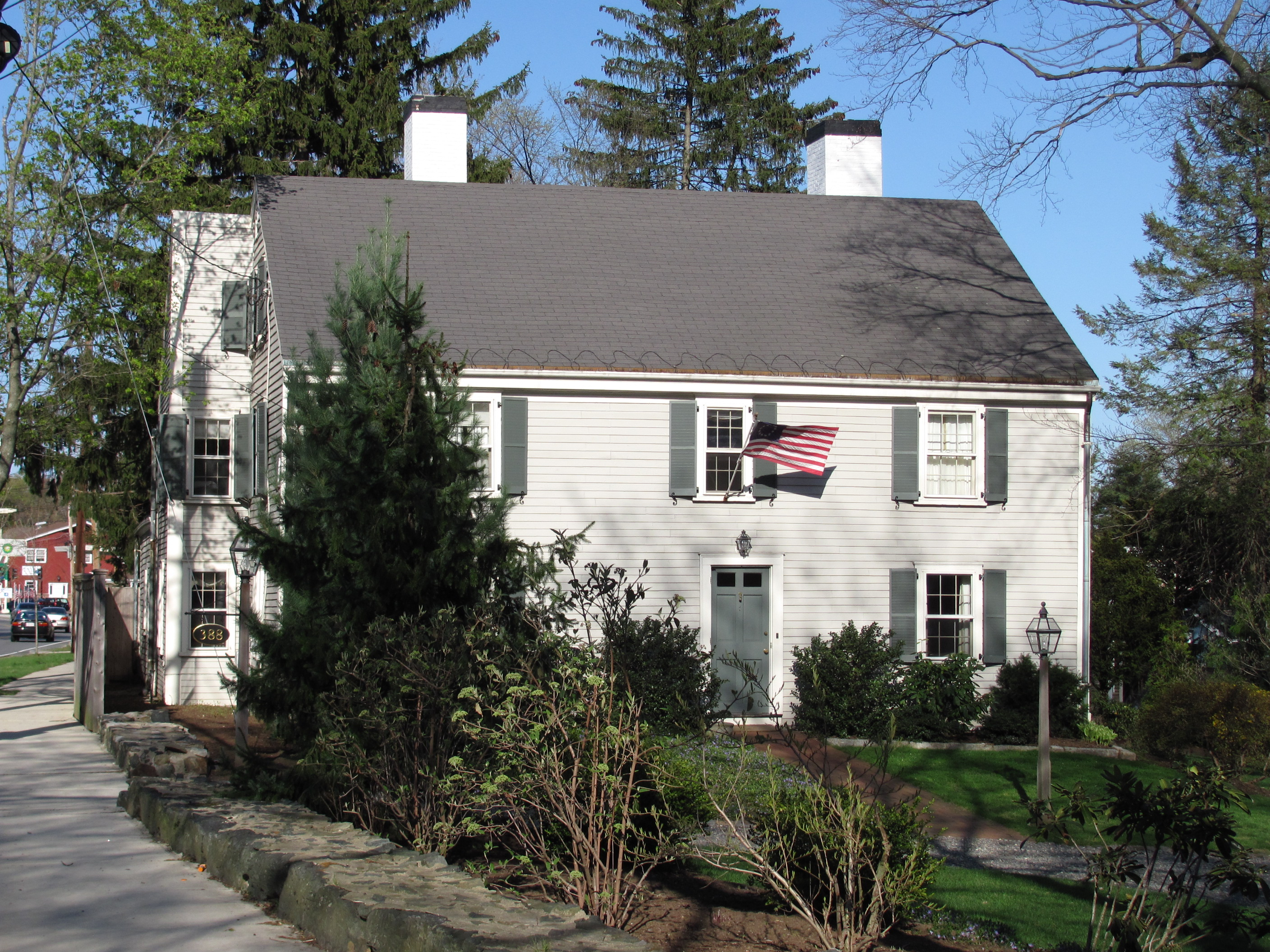
- Abraham Hill House

- Location within Massachusetts Location within the United States
- Location: 388 Pleasant St., Belmont, Massachusetts
- Coordinates: 42°24′10″N 71°10′6″W
- Area: less than one acre
- Built: c. 1725
- Built by: Abraham Hill
- Architectural style: Colonial
- MPS: First Period Buildings of Eastern Massachusetts TR
- NRHP reference No.: 90000164
- Added to NRHP: March 9, 1990

The Abraham Hill House is a historic First Period house in Belmont, Massachusetts, United States. Probably built in the early 18th century, it is one of the oldest buildings in the town. Its construction history shows changing residential trends over two hundred years of history. The house was listed on the National Register of Historic Places in 1990.

== Description and history ==
The Abraham Hill House is located northeast of downtown Belmont, on the southeast side of Pleasant Street (Massachusetts Route 60) between its junctions with Prospect Street and Scott Road. It is a 2 1/2-story wood-frame structure, with a gabled roof and clapboarded exterior. It is oriented with a gable end to the street, and its main facade on the side. The facade is three bays wide, with asymmetrical positioning including a slightly off-center entrance. Two brick chimneys rise from the interior through the rear roof face. There are 4 rooms to each floor in the main house. Each room has a fireplace. The kitchen had an extension from the chimney to ovens. On the left side of the house, the rear section extends beyond the side wall, a feature known regionally as a "Beverly jog". A single-story ell extends to the rear (northeast) side of the main block.

The house is one of the oldest houses in Belmont, if not the very oldest. Its construction date is claimed by local historians to be 1693, but architectural analysis places its construction later, c. 1725–1750. It was enlarged significantly in the 1790s by Abraham Hill's son James, who was born in the house. Alterations included the conversion of the house from a central chimney plan to a central hall plan. It remained in the Hill family until 1942. The stockade fence was added in the 1960s. The ground floor windows are only 3-4' from the sidewalk. The hand hewn floor boards were about 2' wide of a yellowish orange color after waxing

== See also ==
- National Register of Historic Places listings in Middlesex County, Massachusetts
