= Shamrocks =

Solitaire card game

- A Patience game
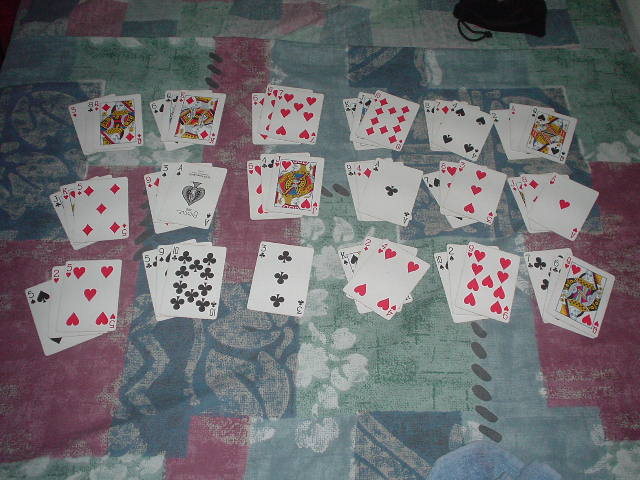
- The layout at the start of the game of "La Belle Lucie." The game of "Shamrocks" starts the same way.
- Family: Fan
- Deck: Single 52-card

Shamrocks is a solitaire game akin to La Belle Lucie. The object is the same as the latter: move the cards into the foundations.

== Rules ==
The game is laid out as in La Belle Lucie: seventeen piles of three cards are placed on the table with one card counting as an eighteenth. Any card that can be moved to the foundations should be moved and built up by suit (starting from the ace). The top card of each pile can be used for play and once a pile is empty, it cannot be refilled.

Before the game begins, each King which is on top or middle of its respective pile is placed underneath. Morehead and Mott-Smith's rules to the game specifically states that a King that is on top of a lower-ranked card of the same suit should be placed under that lower-ranked card, no matter what else in its pile. Some rules suggest that kings not be moved to the bottom of the piles during the initial layout (as pictured on the right), which significantly decreases the chances of successful play.

To play on the tableau, a card can be placed on a card that is one rank higher or lower, regardless of suit (a 6♠ can be placed on a 7♣ or a 5♦). However, each pile can hold no more than three cards at a time; thus no card can be placed on a pile with three cards.

The game is won when all of the cards have been moved to the foundations.

== See also ==
- La Belle Lucie
- List of solitaire games
- Glossary of solitaire terms
