= Hill Mansion =

Historic house in Virginia, United States

- U.S. National Register of Historic Places
- U.S. Historic district – Contributing property
- Virginia Landmarks Register
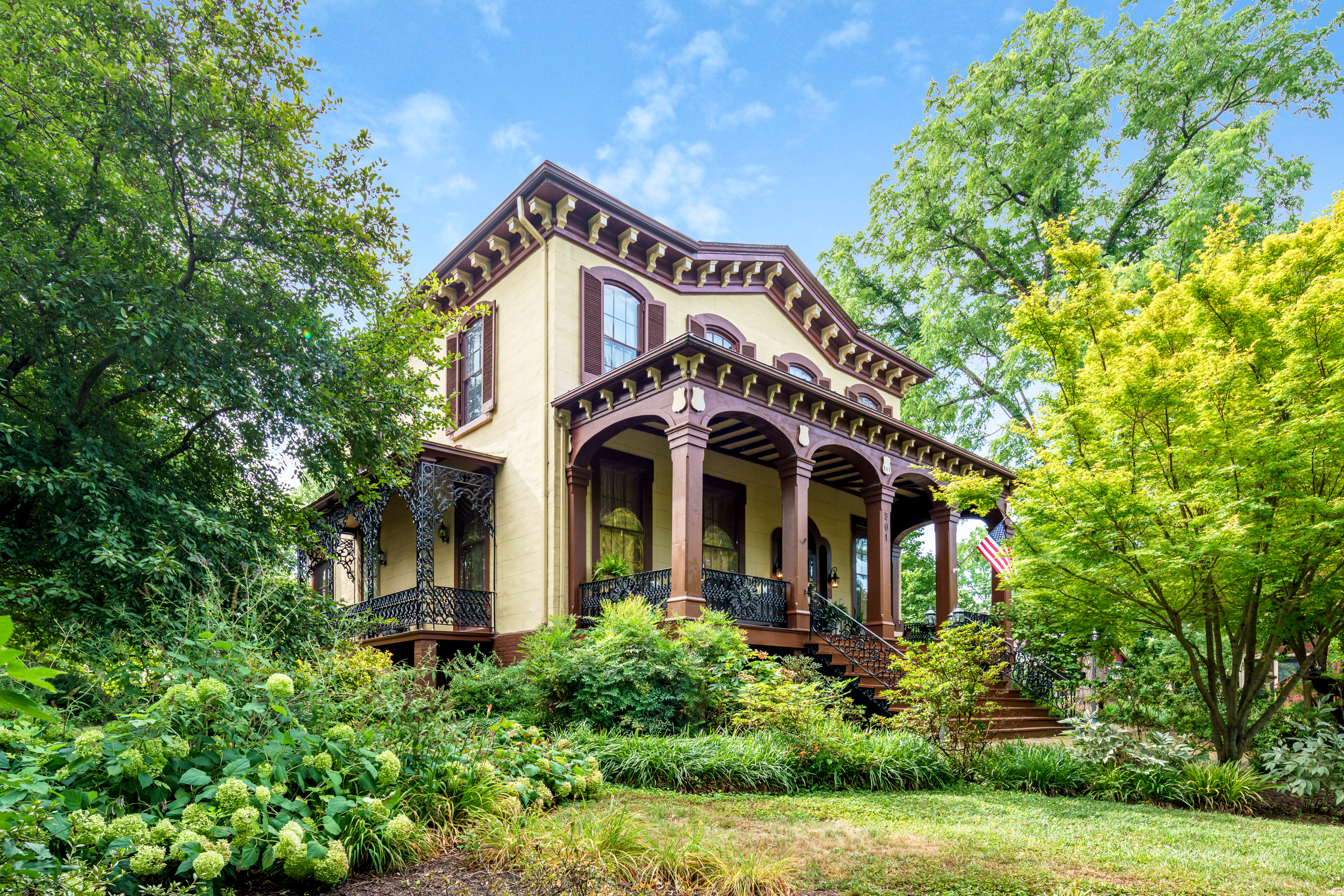
- Circa 1854 Hill Mansion Italiante style home located at 501 S East St in Culpeper Virginia

- Location within Virginia Location within the United States
- Location: 501 East St., Culpeper, Virginia
- Coordinates: 38°28′13″N 77°59′43″W
- Area: 2 acres (0.81 ha)
- Built: 1853-1857
- Architectural style: Italianate
- NRHP reference No.: 80004182
- VLR No.: 204-0002

Significant dates
- Added to NRHP: March 17, 1980
- Designated VLR: December 18, 1979

Hill Mansion is a historic home located at Culpeper, Culpeper County, Virginia. It was built in 1857–1858, and is a two-story, four-bay, brick dwelling in the Italianate style. It measures 39 feet by 38 feet, 7 inches, and rests on a high brick foundation. The front facade features a one-story porch consisting of an arcade, supported on Tuscan order piers, with a bracketed cornice. It was the home of Edward Baptist Hill, whose brother, General A. P. Hill, was a frequent visitor during the American Civil War. It also served as a Confederate hospital and later as headquarters for Union officers.

It was listed on the National Register of Historic Places in 1980. It is included in the South East Street Historic District.
