= Transatlantic Intelligencer =

Advocacy website

The Transatlantic Intelligencer was an advocacy website centering on European politics and its American reception. Up until August 2005, it was a blog but at that point it transitioned into a news magazine website format. It tried to surpass the perceived "language gap" between the continents and in Europe itself, aiming mainly at the American audience. Due to their political weight and influence, it focused on France and Germany.

The site featured the Trans-Int Review, provided "major translations and original articles" dealing with key topics of current "European politics and transatlantic relations". The Trans-Int News supplied translated extracts from leading European news purveyors and necessary information on backgrounds.

The site's editor was John Rosenthal, whose writings and translations of French- and German- language journalism have appeared in publications such as Monthly Review, Le Figaro, Newsday, Policy Review, Merkur, Claremont Review of Books, Tech Central Station, World Politics Review and Les Temps Modernes. He taught political philosophy and the history of European philosophy at Rutgers University, New York University, and the École Normale Supérieure de Lyon. He also served as Contributing Editor Europe for World Politics Review.

The website stopped publication in 2016 with no announced plans for revival.
