= A. P. Hill House =

Historic house in Clarkesville, Georgia, US

- U.S. National Register of Historic Places
- Location within Georgia
- Location: N. Washington St., Clarkesville, Georgia
- Coordinates: 34°36′48″N 83°31′30″W
- Area: 0.3 acres (0.12 ha)
- Built: 1930
- Architectural style: Bungalow/craftsman
- MPS: Clarkesville MRA
- NRHP reference No.: 82002433
- Added to NRHP: August 18, 1982

The A. P. Hill House, on N. Washington St. in Clarkesville, Georgia, was built in 1930. It was listed on the National Register of Historic Places in 1982.

It is a one-story brick Craftsman-style bungalow.

It is also known as the Peter Rosetty House.

The house may no longer exist, because it seems difficult to identify any candidate matching the 1980 photo using Google Streetview imagery of 2018, along Washington Street.
