= J. S. Hill House =

Historic house in North Carolina, United States

- U.S. National Register of Historic Places
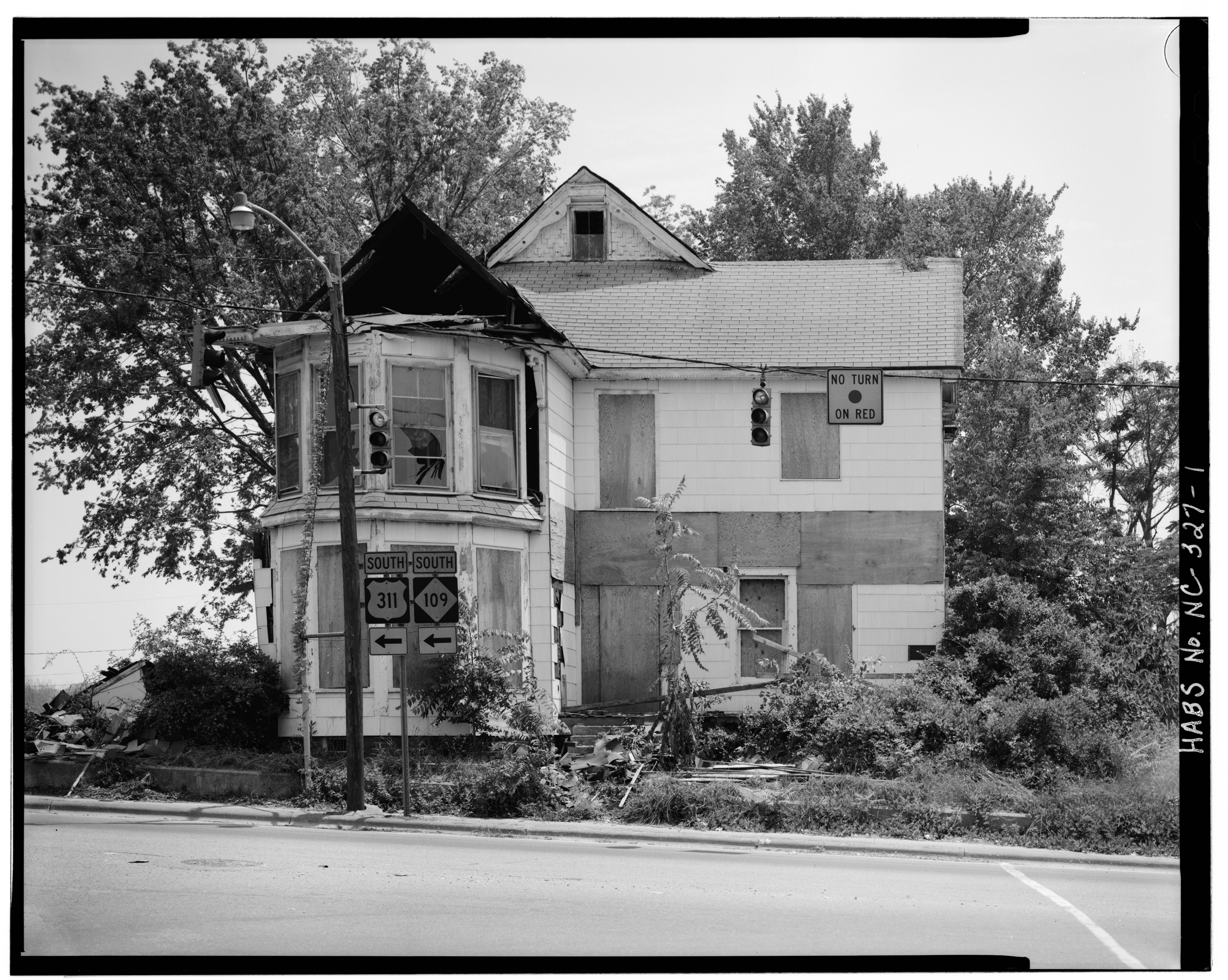
- J. S. Hill House, HABS Photo

- Location within North Carolina Location within the United States
- Location: 914 Stadium Dr., Winston-Salem, North Carolina
- Coordinates: 36°5′24″N 80°13′41″W
- Area: less than one acre
- Built: 1893
- MPS: Slater Industrial Academy Houses TR
- NRHP reference No.: 79001705
- Added to NRHP: July 22, 1979

J. S. Hill House was a historic home located at Winston-Salem, Forsyth County, North Carolina. The house was built about 1893, and was a large two-story, three-bay, frame dwelling. The front facade had a projecting two-story bay with prominent gable. It was built by J. S. Hill, the chief fund raiser for the Slater Industrial Academy for African-American students. The house has been demolished.

It was listed on the National Register of Historic Places in 1979.
