= Matt and Emma Hill Farmstead =

- Matt and Emma Hill Historic Farmstead
- U.S. National Register of Historic Places
- U.S. Historic district
- Location within Minnesota Location within the United States
- Location: 6206 Honkola Road, Pike Township, Minnesota
- Coordinates: 47°39′21″N 92°19′56″W
- Area: 160 acres (65 ha)
- Built: c. 1897–1903, c. 1920
- Architect: Matt Hill
- Architectural style: Log
- MPS: Rural Finnish Log Buildings of St. Louis County, Minnesota, 1890–1930s MPS
- NRHP reference No.: 90000768
- Added to NRHP: April 9, 1990

The Matt and Emma Hill Farmstead is a historic farmstead in Pike Township, Minnesota, United States. It was established in 1897 by one of many Finnish Americans who left employment in Iron Range mines to begin farming northern Minnesota's cutover forests. The farm was listed as a historic district on the National Register of Historic Places in 1990 for its state-level significance in the themes of agriculture, architecture, and European ethnic heritage. It was nominated for reflecting the pivot of St. Louis County's Finnish immigrants from industrial labor to agriculture, and their use of traditional log architecture.

== Description ==
The historic district consists of eight contributing properties. A house, hay barn, cattle barn, outbuilding, and the farm's original smoke sauna date from 1897 to 1903. An improved sauna was built around 1920. All were designed and constructed in log by Matt Hill. Rounding out the inventory of historic properties are the farm's well and agricultural fields.

== See also ==
- National Register of Historic Places listings in St. Louis County, Minnesota
