= Intellect (disambiguation) =

Intellect is a faculty of the human mind that enables reasoning, conceptualization, judgment, and the discernment of truth and falsehood in reality.

Intellect may also refer to:

- Active intellect, in medieval philosophy
- General intellect, in Marxist theory
- Passive intellect, in philosophy

== In music ==
- "Intellect", a song by Killing Joke, 1998

== See also ==
- Intellect Games, a 1970s board game manufacturing company
- Intellectual, a person who engages in critical thinking, research, and reflection about the reality of society
- Intelligence, the ability to perceive or infer information, and to retain it as knowledge
- Nous, a concept from classical philosophy
