= La Belle Lucie =

Card game

- A Patience game
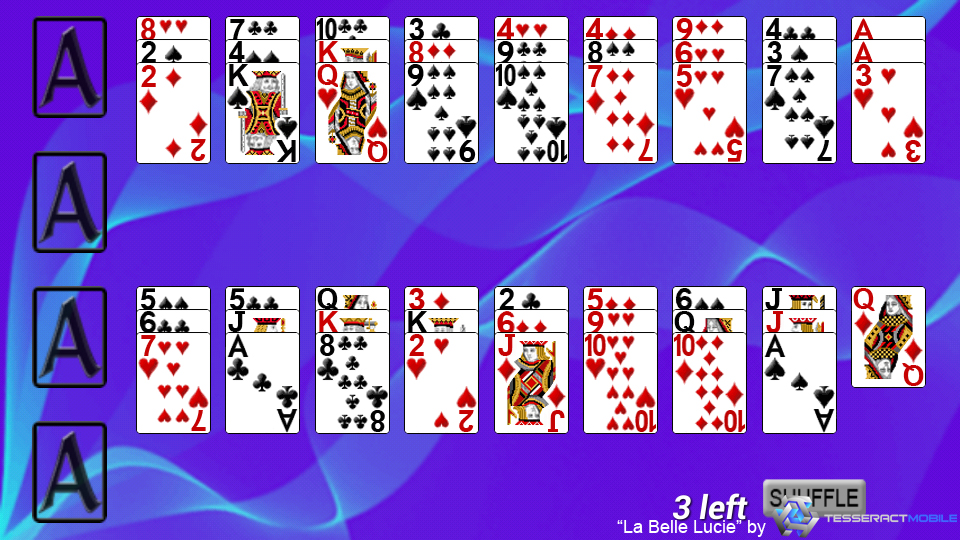
- Screenshot of La Belle Lucie
- Alternative names: Alexander the Great, Clover Leaves, Midnight Oil
- Named variants: The Fan, Trefoil, Three Shuffles and a Draw
- Family: Fan
- Deck: Single 52-card

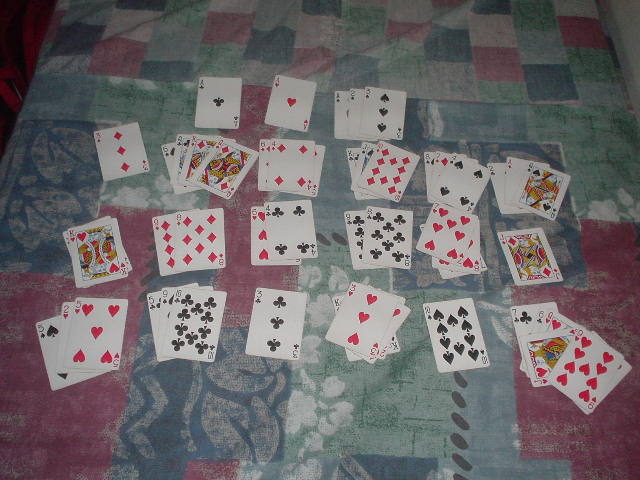
A game in progress

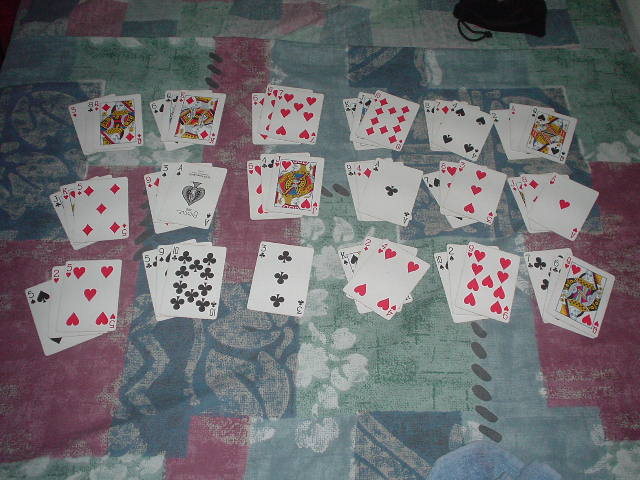
layout

La Belle Lucie is a patience or card solitaire where the object is to build the cards into the foundations. It is considered to be representative of the "fan" family of solitaire card games, and has a pleasing layout.

While the game originated in France as La Belle Lucie, it is also known under the name Lovely Lucy. Other common names and closely related variants include The Fan, Clover Leaves, Three Shuffles and a Draw, Alexander the Great, Trefoil, and Midnight Oil.

All cards are visible from the start, but this does not imply that this game is solvable with strategy, because the game is very hard to win under the default rules. For example, moving a single card onto another blocks that stack until both cards can be removed to the foundations. Any setup that has a lower card of a specific suit below a higher of the same suit, or all kings not on the bottom of each cascade cannot be solved without cheating. The shuffle and redeal is of little help. For each king left in the second redeal, there is a 66% chance that the cascade cannot be solved (if the king is not lowest). Moving aces out (Trefoil rule) has cosmetic character.

== History ==
La Belle Lucie is "a classic patience game" that was first published in the English language by Lady Adelaide Cadogan in 1870.

== Rules ==
- The tableau consists of seventeen fans of three cards each with a single card counting as an eighteenth fan.
- Only the top card of each fan could be played.
- Any aces are moved to the foundations and are built from there.
- Cards are moved to the foundations by suit in ascending order (e.g. 2♦ over A♦).
- Cards are moved to other fans by suit in descending order (e.g. 7♣ over 8♣).
- When a fan becomes empty, it cannot be filled again, even with a king.
- Once all possible moves have been exhausted, the entire tableau is reshuffled and redealt, again in fans of three with the remainder counting as a separate fan. There are only two reshuffles allowed in the game.
- The game is considered won when all cards are transferred into the foundations

== Variants ==
Variants are listed in the order they will occur in the game play:

- Trefoil:
  - The aces are immediately transferred to the foundations and the remaining 48 cards are shuffled and dealt in sixteen fans of three to begin the game.
  - The tableau consists of sixteen fans of three cards each.
- The Fan:
  - When a fan becomes empty, it can be filled with a king. This rule is recommended as it makes things easier and increases odds of solving the game. [The king rule.]
  - No redeals of cards. [The no redeal rule.]
- Three Shuffles and a Draw:
  - When all possible moves have been exhausted after the two reshuffles without finishing, the player can still make one last possible move called a merci (French for "thank you", but also for "mercy" or "grace"), wherein one can pick out (or draw) a buried card, i.e. any card that is not the top card of any fan, and use it to continue the game and finish it. This special move and three shuffles involved (including the original shuffling of the cards before the start of any new game) give the variation its name.
- La belle Benedikte:
  - Include two jokers to the deck, and all 54 cards are shuffled and dealt in eighteen fans of three to begin the game.
  - Kings can be moved to replace a top placed joker.
  - Jokers can only be moved to an emptied fan location.
  - No redeals of cards. [The no redeal rule.]

The "no redeal rule" and the "king rule" are often used together since redeals are needed to get to cards under a king unless it’s allowed to move kings to empty fans.

Shamrocks is a closely related variant that limits building in the tableau to three cards per fan.

== Strategies ==
Since all cards are visible after the deal, the basic strategy is to think before doing moves. A redeal is not always of much help, since it will give fewer fans than the initial deal.

Cards under a king are blocked until the redeal or until the king is moved to the foundations (if the "king rule" is not in effect).

=== For standard rules ===
- Since cards only can be moved once (because 7♣ only can be moved to 8♣), the cards under moved cards will be blocked until the redeal or until the cards above are moved to the foundations.
- It is always safe to build on a fan that contains only one card.
- It is likewise always safe to build on a king, since the cards under it is blocked anyway (as long as the "king rule" is not in effect).
- It is also safe to build on a sequence of two or more cards of a suit (like 7♣ on 8♣), since the cards under it is blocked anyway.
- It is always safe to move cards to the foundations.
- Before moving a card consider if the destination card can be moved first (e.g. before moving 7♣ over 8♣, consider if it is possible to move 8♣ over 9♣).

=== For the "alternating colours rule for moves between fans" ===
The "alternating colours rule for moves between fans" will simplify the difficulty a little bit and slightly increase the move but will significantly change the strategy used in the game:

- Even if cards can be moved multiple times, and thus cards under moved cards are not always blocked, it will often be the case, especially when the fan becomes larger.
- Even if it is not always safe; if a fan contains only one card it is safer to build on it than on other fans.
- It is likewise safer to build on a king than on other cards, since the cards under it is blocked anyway (as long as the "king rule" is not in effect).
- Build evenly on the foundations; i.e. try to move all four Aces up to the foundations first, then move all the 2's, etc. Not following this strategy will limit the moves possible between the fans, even after a redeal.
- Before moving a card consider if the destination card can be moved first (e.g. before moving 7♣ over 8♦, consider if it is possible to move 8♦ over 9♣).
- All cards can be moved over two other cards. Therefore before moving a card, say 7♦ over 8♣, consider the need to instead move 7♥ over the destination 8♣, or the possibility to instead move the source card 7♦ over 8♠.

=== For the "regardless of suit for moves between fans" (Super Flower Garden) ===
The "regardless of suit for moves between fans" will simplify the difficulty and increase the moves

- You can manoeuvre a single card on another to uncover cards to move them on the foundation
- For example, a 3♠ can be moved on any four to uncover the 4♥ to the foundation with the 3♥

== Bibliography ==
- Arnold, Peter (2011). Card Games for One. London: Chambers. ISBN 978-0550-10201-0.
- Cadogan, Lady Adelaide (1968) [1875]. Illustrated Games of Patience: A facsimile of the original published in London, 1875. Watford: Abacus.

== See also ==
- Three Shuffles and a Draw
- Bristol
- House in the Woods
- Shamrocks
- List of solitaires
- Glossary of solitaire
