= Hill House (Parkton, Maryland) =

Historic house in Maryland, United States

- U.S. National Register of Historic Places
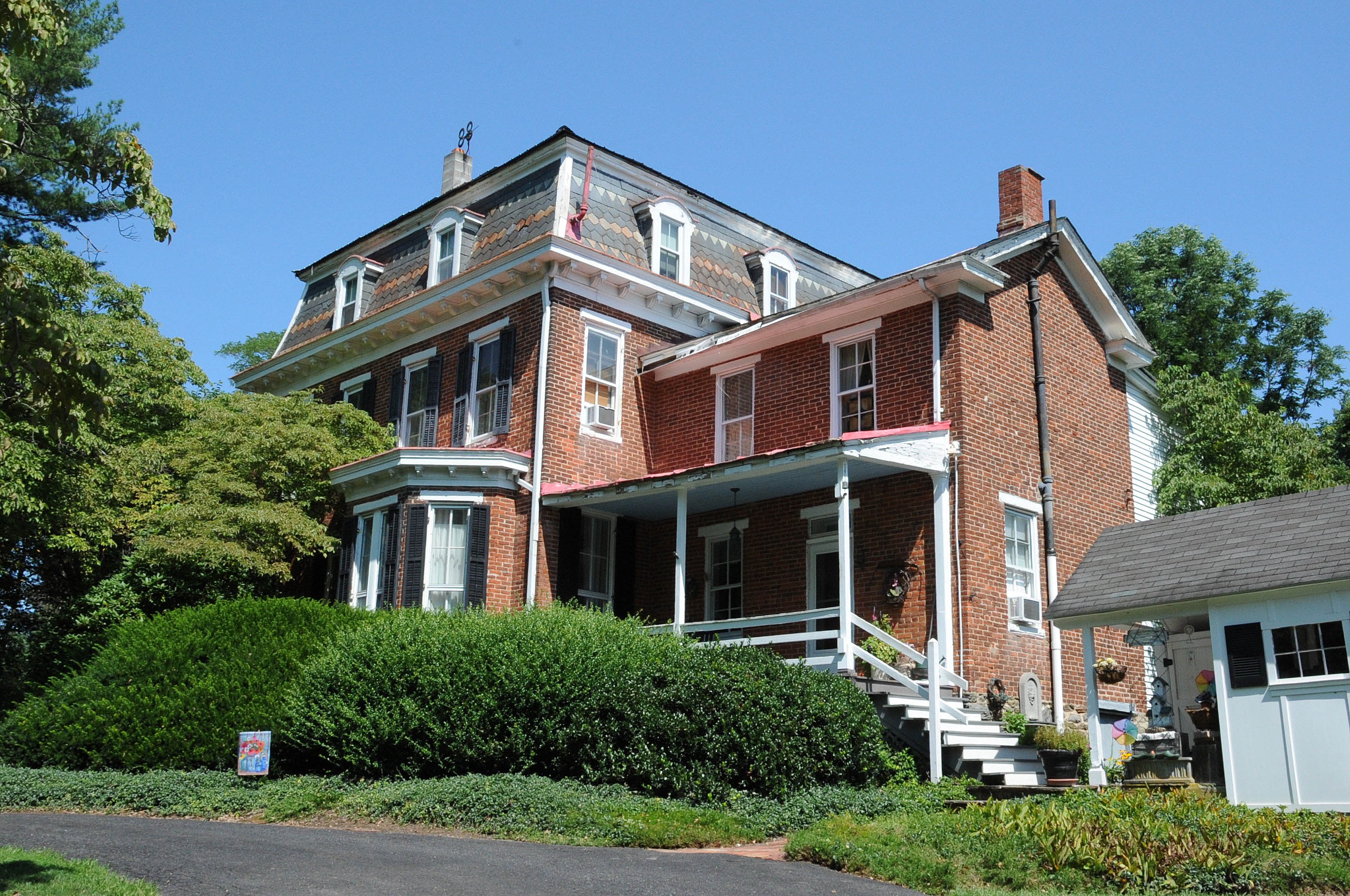
- in 2024

- Location within Maryland Location within the United States
- Location: 19301 York Rd., Parkton, Maryland
- Coordinates: 39°39′12″N 76°39′10″W
- Area: 6.2 acres (2.5 ha)
- Built: 1879
- Architectural style: Second Empire
- NRHP reference No.: 86000415
- Added to NRHP: March 6, 1986

Hill House, also known as Cool Spring, is a historic home located on York Road at Parkton, Baltimore County, Maryland, United States. It is a large, 2 1/2-story brick mansard-roofed dwelling constructed about 1879. It features a four-paneled central entrance door flanked by round-arched sidelights and surmounted by a rectangular transom. The house presents a rural interpretation of the Second Empire style.

Hill House was listed on the National Register of Historic Places in 1986.
