= The Hill School (Virginia) =

Private school in Middleburg, Virginia, US

Location
- PO Box 65; Middleburg, Loudoun County, Virginia 20118-0065; United States; 38.9654°N 77.7349°W

Information
- Type: Private primary day school
- Motto: Latin: Ad astra per aspera (To the stars through difficulties)
- Religious affiliation: Nonsectarian
- Established: 1926; 100 years ago
- NCES School ID: 01434296
- Head of school: Treavor D. Lord
- Faculty: 32.6 (on an FTE basis)
- Grades: PK-8
- Gender: Coeducational
- Enrollment: 239 (2021-2022)
  - Pre-kindergarten: 10
  - Kindergarten: 20
  - Grade 1: 23
  - Grade 2: 23
  - Grade 3: 24
  - Grade 4: 28
  - Grade 5: 31
  - Grade 6: 32
  - Grade 7: 29
  - Grade 8: 29
- Classes: 10-15
- Student to teacher ratio: 7.3:1
- Hours in school day: 7.5
- Campus size: 137 acres (55 ha)
- Campus type: Distant rural
- Colors: Green & White
- Nickname: Lions
- Affiliation: NAIS
- Website: www.thehillschool.org

The Hill School is a private, K-8 co-educational day school in Middleburg, Virginia, United States.

== History ==
Hill School opened in 1926 with five students in an upstairs room in the Middleburg Bank at 1 East Washington Street. In 1928, the school moved to a half acre of land at its current location.

Over the next sixty-three years (1928-1991), the school's enrollment and campus steadily grew. In 1991, the enrollment was 178, and the 4.5-acre campus consisted of five buildings, one playing field, and a faculty house.

In 1991 and 1992, Mr. Stephen C. Clark Jr. and his daughter, Hill alumna Jane Forbes Clark, gave the school 133 acres, three houses, and a barn.

== Curriculum ==
In addition to the PK-8 science curriculum emphasizing hands-on learning, Hill School incorporates place-based outdoor field studies – the Dornin Science Center units. This unique program allows children to use scientific field methodology to monitor, interact with, and connect to their environment, which fosters responsible stewardship. Field studies include forest surveys, water quality monitoring using chemical tests and invertebrate surveys, soil testing and soil amendment, growing food, bluebird box construction and observation, colonial gardening, and many other outdoor activities. Most of these programs take place on our beautiful 137-acre campus, which includes a variety of habitats and open spaces.

Hill School refers to Art, Music, Drama, and Athletics as co-curricular programs to emphasize that they are part of a parcel of every student's Hill School experience. Hill believes that every child should have meaningful participation and engagement with these co-curricular programs.

== Campus ==
The campus was expanded by 133 acres in 1991 and 1992 through the gifts of land from Stephen C. Clark Jr. and his daughter, Hill alumna Jane Forbes Clark. As a result, the Board of Trustees and school leadership developed a comprehensive master plan, completed between 1993 and 2003.

Most of the daily school routine occurs in the northeast quadrant of the campus. The academic and co-curricular facilities are separated by small courtyards and are connected by a central brick walkway. Traffic circles and parking areas are located on the perimeter, so there is no car parking on the central campus.

The athletic fields, the amphitheater, the walking and running trails, the arboretum, the science center, ponds, and wetlands are located to the south and west of the buildings and encompass most of the land. Five of the fifteen school-owned faculty houses are on or contiguous to the campus.
