= House in the Woods =

Card game

- A Patience game
- Named variants: House on the Hill
- Family: Fan
- Deck: Double 52-card

House in the Woods (also known as House in the Wood) is a patience game which uses two decks of 52 playing cards. The game is basically a two-deck version of La Belle Lucie, but it borrows two things from its cousin Shamrocks, namely the building of cards up or down and the fact that there are no redeals.

== Rules ==
The cards are dealt in sets of three, resulting in 34 piles, with two cards left over as a thirty-fifth. The top card of each pile is available for play.

The cards on the tableau are built either up or down by suit; the player can have the cards go both directions at the same pile. However, an ace cannot be placed on a king and vice versa; an ace should be transferred to the foundations. Furthermore, when a pile becomes empty, it cannot be filled. All eight foundations are built up in suit starting from aces.

The object of the game is to place all 104 cards on the eight foundations.

House in the Woods can be won nine times out of ten, provided that the player plays optimally and without mistakes.

== Variants ==
House on the Hill is closely related patience game that also uses two decks. It is played with the same rules as those of House in the Woods except that while the four aces must occupy four of the eight foundations, the four kings must occupy the other four. The aces are built up by suit up to kings, the kings are built down by suit to aces.

== See also ==
- La Belle Lucie
- Shamrocks
- List of solitaires
- Glossary of solitaire
