= Captain Timothy Hill House =

Historic house in Virginia, United States

- U.S. National Register of Historic Places
- Virginia Landmarks Register
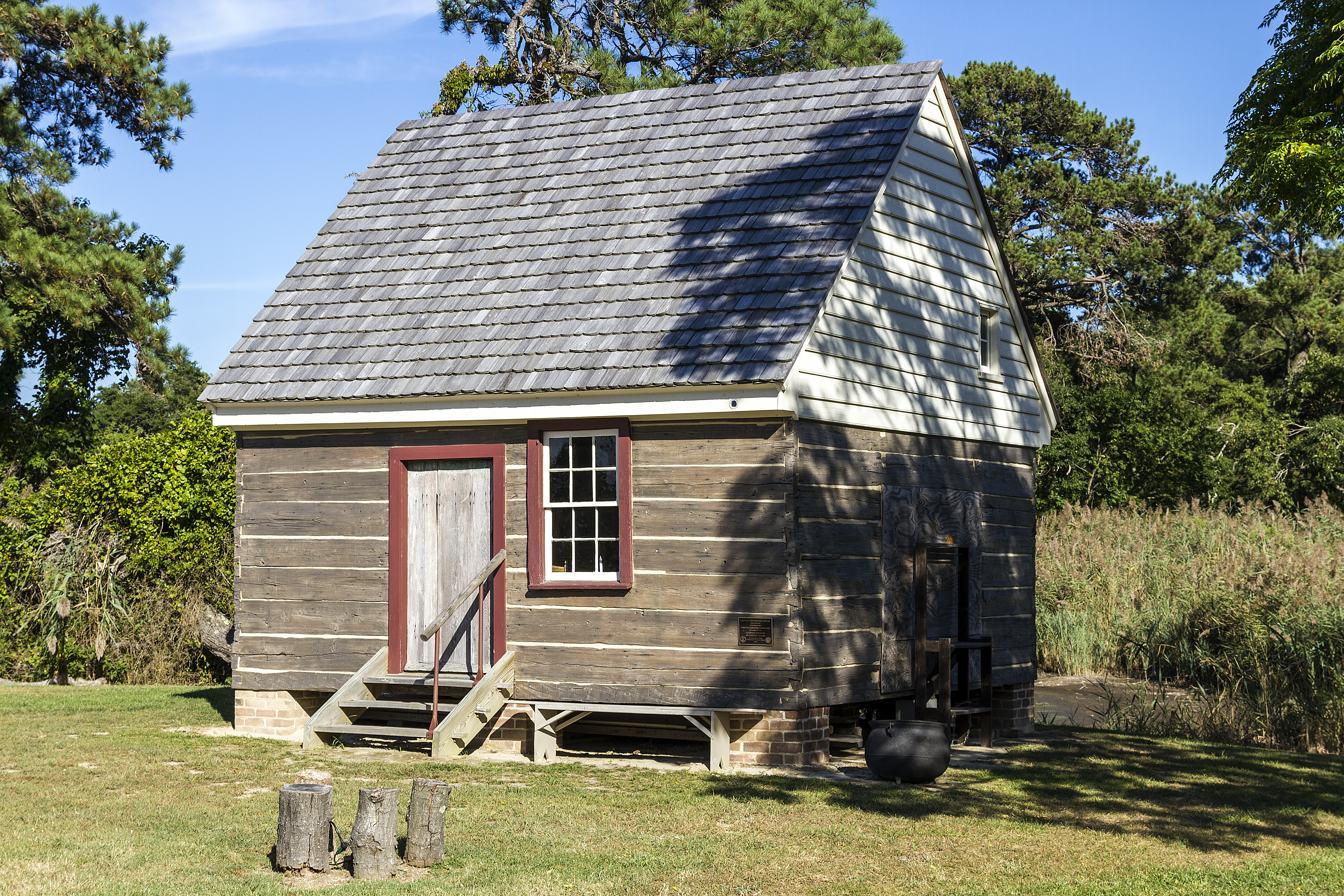

- Location within Virginia Location within the United States
- Location: 5122 Main St., Chincoteague Island, Virginia
- Coordinates: 37°56′53″N 75°21′24″W
- Area: 1.82 acres (0.74 ha)
- Built: c. 1800-1859
- NRHP reference No.: 11000547
- VLR No.: 001-0274

Significant dates
- Added to NRHP: August 22, 2011
- Designated VLR: June 16, 2011

Captain Timothy Hill House is a historic home located at Chincoteague Island, Accomack County, Virginia. It was built about 1800, and moved to its present location in 1980 when faced with demolition. It is a 1 1/2-story dwelling that was built using pit sawn and hewn pine planks and measures 17 feet, 4 inches, by 16 feet, 4 inches. It currently sits on a low brick pier foundation. It has a modern roof featuring a steep side gable with wood shingles and weatherboard. The house has a wooden chimney that represents the first period of this house and features carvings of sailing ships of the period on the exterior log walls. It is significant as a rare surviving example of log plank construction still existent in Virginia, possibly the oldest remaining house on Chincoteague Island, and one of the few houses remaining in Virginia which at one time had a wood chimney.

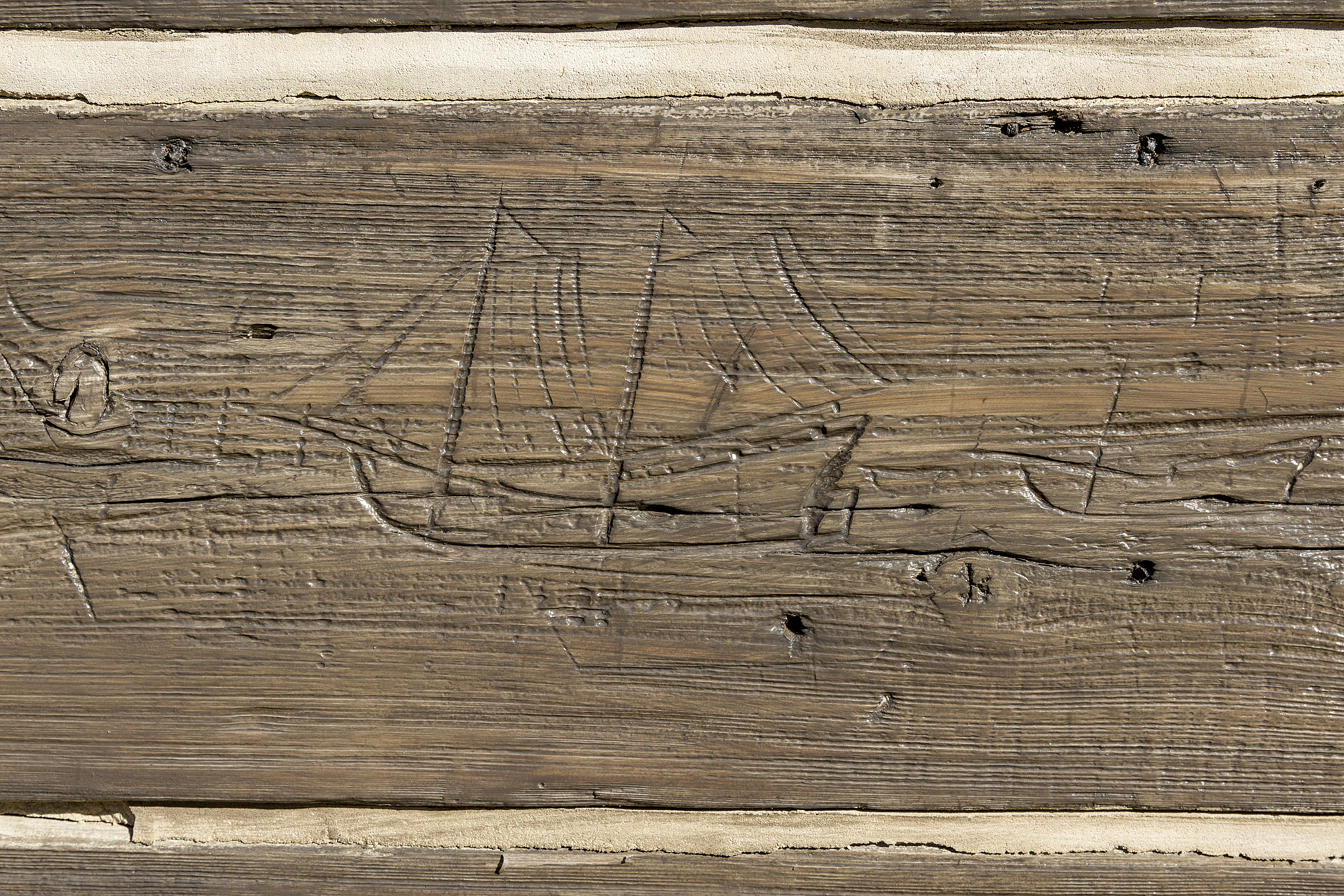
Carving of a sailing vessel next to the front door

It was added to the National Register of Historic Places in 2011.
