= The Intelligencer (Doylestown, Pennsylvania) =

American newspaper

- The July 12, 2012 front page of The Intelligencer
- Type: Daily newspaper
- Format: Broadsheet
- Owner: USA Today Co.
- Publisher: Mike Jameson
- Editor-in-chief: Shane Fitzgerald
- Founded: 1804 (as the Bucks County Intelligencer)
- Headquarters: One Oxford Valley, 2300 East Lincoln Highway, Suite 500D, Langhorne, Pennsylvania 19047; United States
- Circulation: 11,858 (as of 2018)
- Website: phillyburbs.com

The Intelligencer is a daily (except Saturday) morning broadsheet newspaper published in Langhorne, Pennsylvania. The newspaper serves central and northern Bucks County as well as adjacent areas of eastern Montgomery County. It is owned by USA Today Co.

== History ==
The newspaper started in 1804 as the Pennsylvania Correspondent and Farmers' Advertiser, a weekly newspaper in Doylestown. In 1876, the Bucks County Intelligencer moved to an ornate building at 10 E. Court St. in Doylestown, where it was located until 1973.

In 1886, the newspaper became a daily, which called itself The Doylestown Daily Intelligencer.

In 1973, The Daily Intelligencer moved its headquarters to 333 N. Broad St. in Doylestown, and dropped the "Daily" part of its name in the 1990s.

Up until the 1970s, it published as an afternoon newspaper Monday through Saturday. It dropped the Saturday edition for a short time in the late 1970s when it added a Sunday morning edition.

It also published a sister newspaper, the Montgomery County Record (later The Record) in the 1980s and 1990s. As the Montgomery County Record, it was an independent subsidiary competing with its parent newspaper, arriving on the same doorsteps as The Daily Intelligencer.

Later, as The Record, that sister paper was merely a Montgomery County edition of The Daily Intelligencer.

Previously owned by Calkins Media, Inc., The Intelligencer publishes a morning edition six days a week, publishing it seven days a week until February 7, 2009, when it dropped its Saturday edition. In 2017 The Intelligencer was purchased by GateHouse Media.

In addition to its daily newspaper publication, The Intelligencer also posts news online. The newspaper has its own website on theintell.com, which it launched on September 3, 2013. Before this time it shared a site with its sister Calkins Media newspapers Bucks County Courier Times and Burlington County Times.

The paper announced in May 2018 that it was leaving its office in Doylestown.

A timeline of the paper's mastheads:

- 1804 - 1822 Pennsylvania Correspondent and Farmers' Advertiser
- 1822 - 1824 Correspondent and Farmers' Advertiser
- 1824 - 1826 Bucks County Patriot and Farmers' Advertiser
- 1827 - 1842 The Bucks County Intelligencer and General Advertiser
- 1843 - 1886 Bucks County Intelligencer
- 1886 - 1955 Doylestown Daily Intelligencer
- 1955 - 1998 The Daily Intelligencer
- 1998–present The Intelligencer
