= Fairfax Times =

Newspaper in Reston, Virginia

- Type: Weekly newspaper
- Format: Broadsheet
- Owner: Whip It Media
- Editor: Heather Zwicker
- Founded: 1965
- Headquarters: Reston, Virginia
- Circulation: 129,844 weekly
- Website: fairfaxtimes.com

The Fairfax Times (also known as the Fairfax County Times) is a weekly newspaper published in Reston, Virginia which covers Fairfax County, Virginia.

The newspaper's origins can be traced back to the establishment of the Times Community Newspapers by Arthur W. "Nick" Arundel. In 1963, Arundel (the son of Pepsi-Cola bottling magnate Russell Arundel) purchased the 165-year-old Loudoun Times-Mirror (based in Loudoun County, Virginia). He rapidly expanded his newspaper business, purchasing papers in Annandale, Centreville, Chantilly, Fairfax, Herndon, McLean, Reston, Springfield, and Vienna, Virginia. In 2008, Times Community Newspapers merged its local newspapers in Centreville, Fairfax City, Fairfax Station, Herndon, McLean, Reston, and Vienna into a single publication covering all of Fairfax County. This new publication was the Fairfax County Times.

In 2009, The Washington Post reported that the Loudoun Times-Mirror might merge with the Fairfax County Times. The Times-Mirror furloughed many employees, and consolidated most of its newsroom with the Fairfax County Times. However, no merger occurred.

On May 26, 2009, Times Community Newspapers sold the Fairfax County Times to The Gazette, a newspaper group based in Gaithersburg, Maryland. The Gazette group is itself owned by Post-Newsweek Media, a subsidiary of The Washington Post Company. As of February 2012, the Fairfax Times was one of three units operating within the Post-Newsweek Media division.

In November 2012, local D.C. television station WRC-TV co-located its Northern Virginia bureau in the offices of the Fairfax Times.

In August 2013, Amazon.com founder Jeff Bezos purchased the newspaper business of The Washington Post Company for $250 million. The sale included the company's national newspaper, The Washington Post, as well as the Post Express daily free newspaper, El Tiempo Latino (a Spanish language newspaper), The Gazette weeklies, a printing plant located in Springfield, Virginia, and 23 acres (93,000 m^{2}) of land in Charles County, Maryland. Nash Holdings LLC, a company owned by Bezos, became the new owner of the Fairfax Times on September 30, 2013, when the sale closed.

In June 2015, Nash Holdings sold the Fairfax Times to Whip It Media, a locally owned company founded by Richard Whippen, a former general manager of the newspaper.

== Awards ==
In 2012, the Fairfax Times tied for first place for presentation in the Virginia Press Association awards. The newspaper competed in the category of non-dailies with a circulation greater than 10,000. The association gives points to each newspaper in a wide range of categories, including presentation, art/photos, and multimedia. The Gainesville Times and Fairfax Times tied for first place in the presentation category. The Loudoun Times-Mirror won the competition for combined categories for the second year in a row.
