= Culpeper County High School =

High school in Virginia, United States

Location
- 14240 Achievement Drive; Culpeper, Virginia 22701; United States
- Coordinates: 38°29′39.5″N 77°59′14.7″W

Information
- School type: Public, high school
- Motto: Blue Devil Pride
- Established: 1900
- School district: Culpeper County Public Schools
- Superintendent: Tony Brads
- Principal: Daniel Soderholm
- Grades: 9-12
- Enrollment: 1,196 (2016-17)
- Language: English
- Colors: Blue and Gold
- Athletics conference: Virginia High School League; AA Region I Evergreen District
- Mascot: Blue Devil
- Website: cchs.culpeperschools.org

Culpeper County High School (CCHS) is a high school in Culpeper County, Virginia. The current Culpeper County High School was built in 1969, expanded in 2001 and significantly renovated between 2013 and 2015.

The Original Culpeper High School was the Ann Wingfield Building on East Street in downtown Culpeper. In 1949, Culpeper High School was moved north of town into what is now known as Floyd T. Binns Middle School. That building served as Culpeper High School until the late 60's. In the fall of 1951 the school name was changed from Culpeper High School to Culpeper County High School. In 1969, Culpeper High School was moved to its current location.

== Facilities ==
The building is split into three levels.

The main floor has administrative offices, a library, studio, auditorium, cafeteria, and 65 classrooms. The second level houses administrative offices, the gymnasium and 16 classrooms. The third level houses a weight room, two shops, and three classrooms. The school hosts a Culinary Arts program, which is on campus in an adjacent building. As of August 2017, the school's principal is Daniel Soderholm

Its gymnasium is named after William Pearson, one of its most popular principals, who served from the 1970s to the 1990s.

Broman Field (the football stadium) was named after Dr. George Broman. Who served as team doctor for many decades.

== Academic opportunities ==
In addition to courses on the CCHS campus, students can apply to participate in specialized programs that meet at off-campus locations.

A cohort of CCHS students attend Mountain Vista Governor's School to take advanced math, science, humanities, and research courses once they enter their sophomore, junior, and senior years. Additionally, through a partnership with Germanna Community College, students are offered the opportunity to enroll in Germanna Scholars. The successful completion of the Germanna Scholars program allows students to earn an associate degree before high school graduation.

== See also ==
- Eastern View High School
- AA Evergreen District
