= Culpeper County Public Schools =

School district in Virginia, United States

Location
- Culpeper and surrounding areas Virginia United States

District information
- Type: Public
- Grades: Pre K-12
- Established: January 1, 1870; 156 years ago
- Superintendent: Dr. Anthony S. Brads
- Schools: 11
- Budget: $103 million
- NCES District ID: 5101050

Students and staff
- Students: 8,368
- Teachers: 548
- Staff: 982.5 (2023–24)

Other information
- Website: www.culpeperschools.org

Culpeper County Public Schools (CCPS) is a public school district serving all of Culpeper County, Virginia, United States. The system operates eleven schools educating about 8,400 students from pre-kindergarten through twelfth grade and employs roughly 550 full-time teachers. Governed by a seven-member elected school board and led by Superintendent Dr. Anthony S. Brads, its central offices are in Culpeper.

Established in 1870, the division evolved from small segregated one-room schools to a unified system after desegregation in 1968. It now offers a full academic program including Advanced Placement, dual-enrollment with Germanna Community College, and extensive career and technical education through the Culpeper Technical Education Center. CCPS maintains a budget of about $103 million and a 15 : 1 student–teacher ratio, emphasizing modernization, equity, and college-and-career readiness in its strategic plan.

== History ==
=== Early history ===
Public education in Culpeper County dates back to the late nineteenth century. In 1870, the county operated 22 schools for white students and 8 schools for Black students, reflecting the segregated nature of education during the Reconstruction era. Many of these were one-room schoolhouses, which gradually consolidated into larger graded schools as the county population grew.

=== Desegregation and consolidation ===
The unified county school system emerged in the late 1960s as federal desegregation mandates were implemented across Virginia. In 1968, Culpeper County integrated its public schools for the first time, closing the formerly segregated George Washington Carver High School. The newly integrated system brought all of the county’s students under a single district administration.

=== Expansion and modernization ===
The 1970s through the early 2000s saw significant construction and renovation within the district. Culpeper County High School opened in 1969 and was expanded in 2001 to accommodate population growth. A second high school, Eastern View High School, opened in 2008 to reduce overcrowding. Culpeper County High School underwent major renovations between 2013 and 2015, improving facilities, technology infrastructure, and accessibility.

=== Twenty-first century developments ===
In the 2010s and 2020s, the district implemented new academic programs, expanded career and technical education, and increased transparency in budgeting. Enrollment rose by approximately 13 percent between 2008–09 and 2021–22, outpacing several nearby districts. In 2021, the division opened the Culpeper Technical Education Center (CTEC), a modern facility for career and technical training programs.

== Governance and administration ==
The school division is governed by an elected seven-member school board representing the county’s magisterial districts. Members serve four-year terms and appoint a superintendent to manage day-to-day operations. Meetings are held monthly, usually on the second Monday, and are open to the public. The superintendent, Dr. Anthony S. Brads, has led the district since the 2010s.

The district publishes an annual budget and financial report detailing revenues, expenditures, and capital projects. Its FY2026 Budget Book outlines spending priorities for instruction, transportation, facilities, and technology.

== District profile ==
=== Enrollment and staffing ===
As of the 2023–24 school year, Culpeper County Public Schools enrolled 8,368 students and employed approximately 548 full-time equivalent teachers, maintaining a student–teacher ratio of roughly 15:1. The total number of staff members, including administrative and support personnel, was estimated at 982.5.

=== Student demographics ===
The district serves a racially and economically diverse population. In 2023–24, approximately 46 percent of students identified as white, 13 percent as Black or African American, and 29 percent as Hispanic or Latino. About 18 percent of students were English language learners, while 48 percent were classified as economically disadvantaged.

=== Financial profile ===
CCPS operates with an annual budget of approximately $103 million, funded primarily through state and local revenues. Per-pupil expenditure figures for fiscal years 2022–2024 are published on the division’s official website.

== Schools ==
The division operates eleven schools:

- Culpeper County High School
- Eastern View High School
- Culpeper Middle School
- Floyd T. Binns Middle School
- A.G. Richardson Elementary School
- Emerald Hill Elementary School
- Farmington Elementary School
- Pearl Sample Elementary School
- Sycamore Park Elementary School
- Yowell Elementary School
- Culpeper Technical Education Center

== Programs and curriculum ==
Culpeper County Public Schools offers a comprehensive curriculum that includes standard academic subjects, fine arts, and specialized programs. The division provides Advanced Placement (AP) and dual-enrollment opportunities in partnership with Germanna Community College to support college readiness. Career and Technical Education programs at the Culpeper Technical Education Center offer pathways in health sciences, information technology, construction, and automotive repair.

In addition to academic instruction, the district provides services for English learners, students with disabilities, and gifted students. In 2024, CCPS expanded its participation in the Community Eligibility Provision program, providing free breakfast and lunch to all students in every school.

== Infrastructure and facilities ==
The district has invested heavily in school modernization and infrastructure over the past two decades. Culpeper County High School underwent a complete renovation between 2013 and 2015, while Eastern View High School, completed in 2008, was designed to relieve overcrowding at the older campus. Facility improvement projects have included technology upgrades, HVAC replacement, bus fleet modernization, and enhanced security systems. The FY2026 budget outlines future capital projects, including renovations at Culpeper Middle School and expanded career-technical spaces.

== Areas served ==
Culpeper County Public Schools encompasses the entire geographic area of Culpeper County. The district serves students residing in the incorporated Culpeper as well as surrounding unincorporated rural communities such as Jeffersonton, Reva, Rixeyville, and Mitchells. The administrative headquarters are located at 471 James Madison Highway, Suite 201, in Culpeper.

== Controversies and litigation ==
=== COVID-19 policies ===
In 2022, following Executive Order 2 issued by Governor Glenn Youngkin that rescinded mandatory mask requirements in Virginia schools, Culpeper County Public Schools transitioned to a mask-optional policy. The decision came as several Virginia districts joined litigation opposing the order; CCPS ultimately complied with state direction while maintaining optional safety precautions.

=== Personnel incidents ===
In July 2022, a Culpeper County High School teacher was arrested and charged with multiple offenses related to inappropriate electronic communication with a student. The district issued a statement confirming the employee’s suspension and cooperation with law enforcement.

== Community and partnerships ==
CCPS maintains a strong relationship with the local community through parental advisory councils, volunteer programs, and collaborations with local businesses and higher education institutions. Public engagement is encouraged through school board meetings, community surveys, and public hearings on budgets and policies. The district also supports extracurricular activities and interscholastic athletics through the Virginia High School League (VHSL).

== Notable people ==
- Robert Y. Button (1899–1977) – Virginia Attorney General (1962–70), native of Culpeper County.

== Strategic outlook ==
Culpeper County Public Schools continues to emphasize equity, college and career readiness, and modernization of its educational infrastructure. Division priorities outlined in its strategic plan include improving literacy outcomes, expanding digital learning, maintaining small class sizes, and supporting teacher retention amid statewide staffing shortages. The district anticipates modest enrollment growth through 2030 as the Culpeper region continues to develop along the U.S. Route 29 corridor.
