= Frank Reaves Jr. =

Mayor of Culpeper, Virginia

Mayor of Culpeper, Virginia
- Incumbent
- Assumed office January 2022
- Preceded by: Michael T. Olinger

Member of the Culpeper Town Council
- In office 2010–2022

Personal details
- Born: July 12, 1951 (age 75) Culpeper, Virginia, U.S.
- Party: Independent
- Education: Germanna Community College

Frank Reaves Jr. (born July 12, 1951) is an American politician who has served as the mayor of the Town of Culpeper, Virginia since January 2022. He is the first African-American to be elected mayor in the town’s history and previously served on the Culpeper Town Council.

== Early life and education ==
Reaves was born and raised in Culpeper. He graduated from Culpeper County High School and attended Germanna Community College. He is also a graduate of the Rappahannock Regional Criminal Justice Academy. Prior to his political career, he worked as a certified private investigator.

== Local political career ==
Reaves was first elected to the Culpeper Town Council in 2010 and served multiple terms before being elected mayor. During his time on the council he supported initiatives involving parks, public safety, and community facilities. He also appeared in regional voter guides that profiled his political career and priorities.

== Mayor of Culpeper ==
Reaves was sworn in as mayor in January 2022, becoming the first Black mayor in the town’s 262-year history. As mayor, he has spoken publicly about community unity and priorities such as parks and public safety. He has also worked with federal and state officials to secure funding for local projects. In February 2022 he was photographed and quoted during President Joe Biden’s visit to Culpeper.

=== Notable actions ===
- Participated in town decisions such as renaming Lake Pelham to Lake Culpeper.
- Involved in discussions and planning for local parks and recreation facilities documented in Culpeper’s municipal reports.

== Personal life ==
Reaves is married and has been a longtime resident of Culpeper. He has been active in multiple community organizations.
