= Culpeper Historic District =

Historic district in Virginia, United States

- U.S. National Register of Historic Places
- U.S. Historic district
- Virginia Landmarks Register
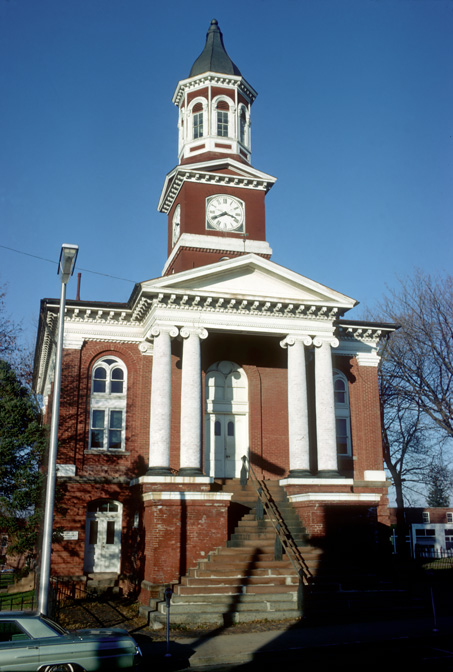
- Culpeper County Courthouse, February 2006

- Location within Virginia Location within the United States
- Location: Roughly bounded by Edmonson St., Southern RR, Stevens, & West Sts., Culpeper, Virginia
- Coordinates: 38°28′22″N 77°59′44″W
- Area: 37 acres (15 ha)
- Architect: Multiple
- Architectural style: Late 19th And 20th Century Revivals, Mid 19th Century Revival, Late Victorian
- NRHP reference No.: 87001809
- VLR No.: 204-0020

Significant dates
- Added to NRHP: October 22, 1987
- Designated VLR: April 21, 1987

Culpeper Historic District is a national historic district located at Culpeper, Culpeper County, Virginia, United States.

== History ==
It encompasses 129 contributing buildings and 1 contributing object in Downtown Culpeper. Notable buildings include the Culpeper County Courthouse (1874), Municipal Building (1928), jail and sheriff's office (1908), the Ann Wingfield School (1929), St. Stephen's Episcopal Church (1821), Culpeper Presbyterian Church (1868), Culpeper Baptist Church (1894), Antioch Baptist Church (1886), Southern Railway Station (1904), Farmers & Merchants Bank Block (c. 1900), Masonic Building (1902), Booton Building (1898), and Second National Bank (c. 1912). The contributing object is the Confederate Memorial dedicated in 1911. Also located in the district is the separately listed A. P. Hill Boyhood Home.

It was listed on the National Register of Historic Places in 1987.
