= Eastern View High School =

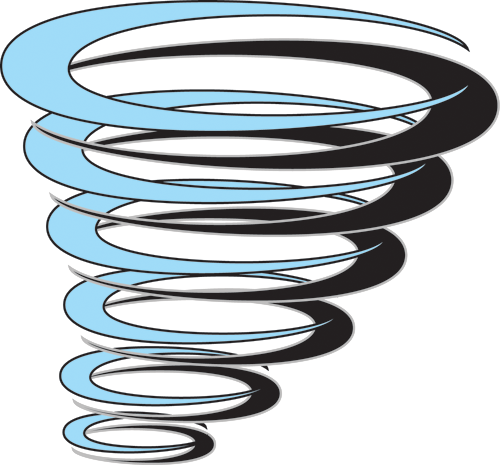

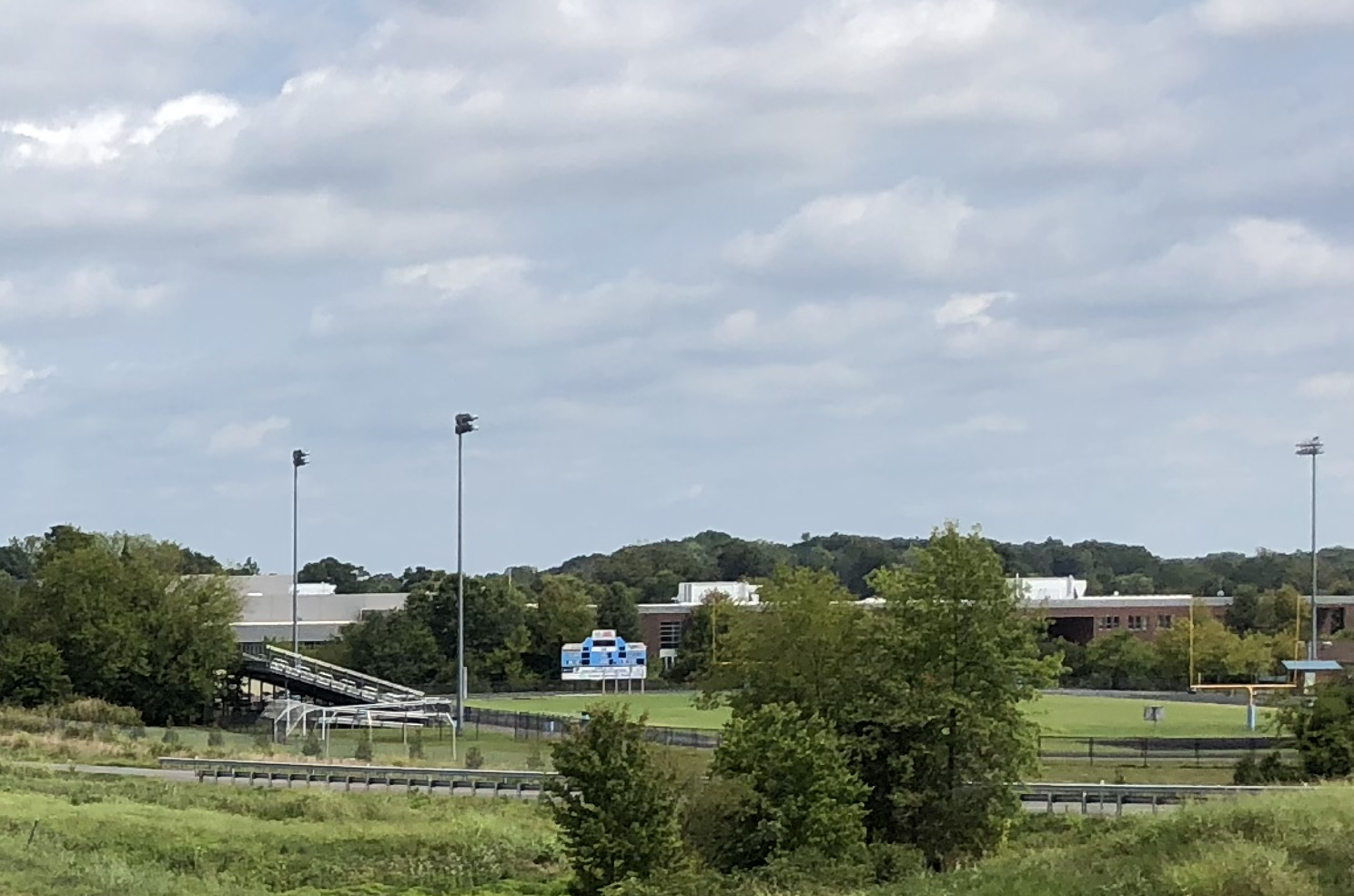

Location
- 16332 Cyclone Way; Culpeper, Virginia; United States; 38°28′29.5″N 77°56′50.5″W

Information
- Type: Public high school
- Motto: Truth and Honor
- Established: 2008
- School district: Culpeper County Public Schools
- Principal: Khaled El-Nemr
- Grades: 9 to 12
- Enrollment: 1,529 (2024-25)
- Colors: Columbia blue, black, and silver
- Athletics conference: VHSL Battlefield District
- Mascot: Captain Cyclone
- Nickname: Cyclones
- Rival: Culpeper County High School
- Website: evhs.culpeperschools.org

Eastern View High School (EVHS) is a four-year public high school located in eastern Culpeper County, Virginia, United States, serving grades 9 through 12 as part of Culpeper County Public Schools. Opened in 2008, it is one of two comprehensive high schools in the school division, alongside Culpeper County High School. As of the 2024–25 school year, the school enrolled approximately 1,529 students.

Eastern View offers Advanced Placement, dual-enrollment, career and technical education, and governor's school programs. Its athletic teams, known as the Cyclones, compete in the Virginia High School League as members of the Battlefield District.

== History ==
The construction for Eastern View High School began in 2006 and was completed in 2008. It is designed to be a green school. A plant recycles non-consumable water. The facility also utilizes natural light by providing a network of windows in both outside and inside walls. The school recycles paper, plastic, aluminum, and cardboard. On the school grounds are a rain garden and a small area of wetlands.

== Administration ==
Since July 2026, the principal of Eastern View High School has been Dr. Khaled El-Nemr. Prior to his appointment, he served as an assistant principal at Eastern View High School for four years and previously worked as a teacher and administrator within Culpeper County Public Schools.

== Academics ==
Eastern View High School offers Advanced Placement (AP), honors, dual-enrollment, and career and technical education courses. Students may also participate in programs through Mountain Vista Governor's School, which serves academically advanced students from several surrounding school divisions.

Through a partnership with Germanna Community College, eligible students may enroll in the Germanna Scholars program and complete coursework toward an associate degree while in high school.

Students may also attend the Culpeper Technical Education Center, which provides regional career and technical education programs for Culpeper County high school students.

== Athletics ==
Eastern View High School competes in the Virginia High School League (VHSL) as a member of Region 4B and the Battlefield District. The school's athletic teams are known as the Cyclones.

The school offers interscholastic competition in football, basketball, baseball, softball, volleyball, soccer, cross country, indoor and outdoor track and field, wrestling, golf, tennis, swimming, field hockey, boys' and girls' lacrosse, scholastic bowl, debate, esports, and Marine Corps JROTC Raider competitions.

=== Cannonball Classic ===
Eastern View High School has an annual football rivalry with Culpeper County High School known as the Cannonball Classic. The rivalry began in 2008, the same year Eastern View opened. Eastern View won each of the first 17 editions of the game.

On September 11, 2025, Culpeper County defeated Eastern View 15–14 in overtime, marking Culpeper County's first victory in the series. Eastern View tied the game at 7–7 in the fourth quarter and later had a potential 45-yard game-winning field goal blocked with 40 seconds remaining. In overtime, Eastern View scored first to take a 14–7 lead. Culpeper County responded with a touchdown and successfully attempted a two-point conversion to win the game 15–14.
