= Slaughter–Hill House =

Historic house in Virginia, United States

- U.S. National Register of Historic Places
- Virginia Landmarks Register
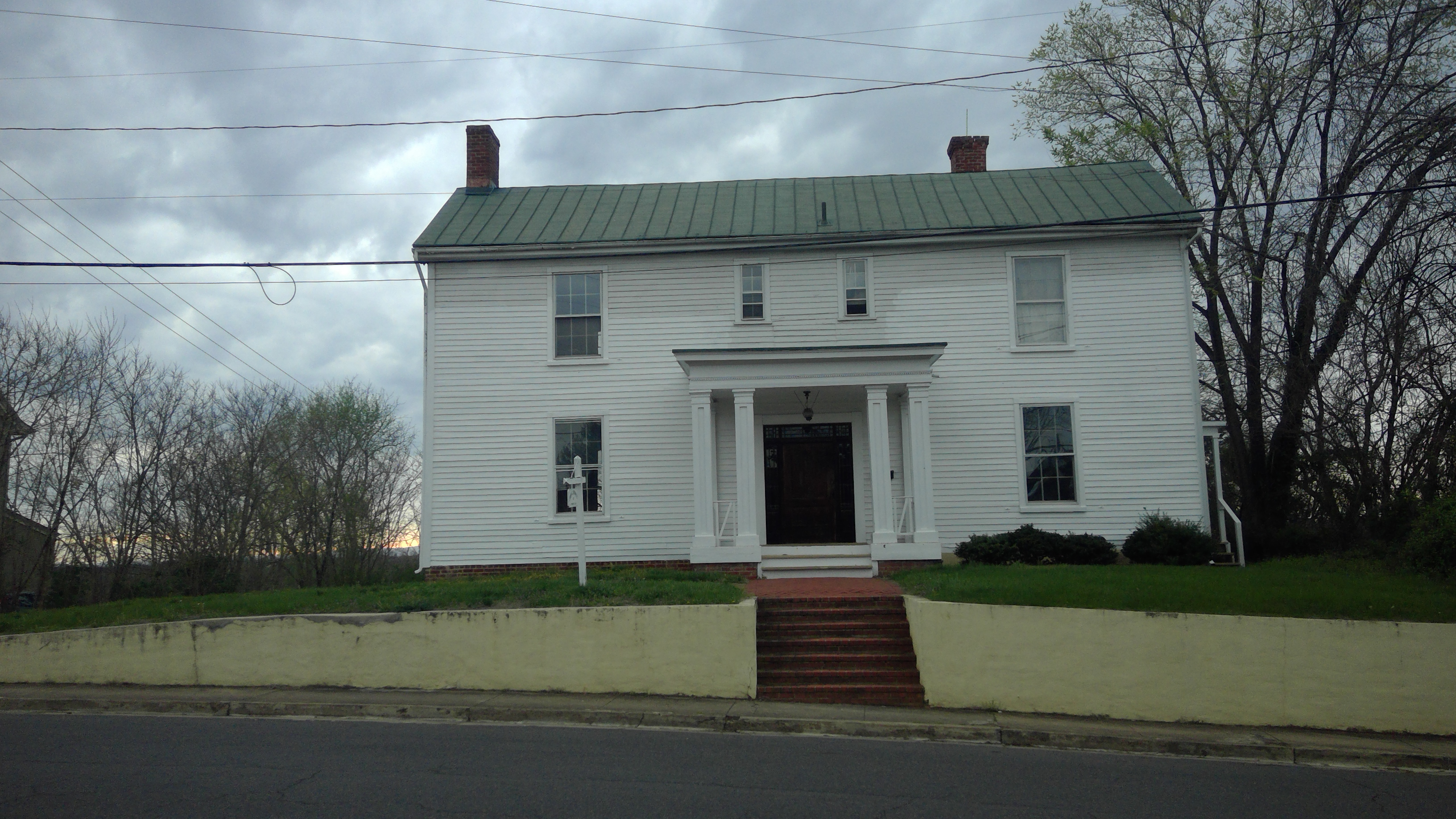
- The Slaughter–Hill House in April 2017

- Location within Virginia Location within the United States
- Location: 306 N. West St., Downtown Culpeper, Virginia
- Coordinates: 38°28′29″N 77°59′52″W
- Area: 0.5 acres (0.20 ha)
- Built: 1775
- Architectural style: Greek Revival, Federal
- NRHP reference No.: 89000203
- VLR No.: 204-0021

Significant dates
- Added to NRHP: March 16, 1989
- Designated VLR: September 20, 1988

This is about the house in Virginia. For the similarly named house and ranch in New Mexico, see Slaughter–Hill Ranch

The Slaughter–Hill House also known as the Corrie Hill House or the Roger Dixon House, is a historic home located at Downtown Culpeper, Culpeper County, Virginia. The original section was built about 1775, and enlarged with a frame addition in the early 19th century, and further enlarged about 1835–1840. It is a two-story, "L"-plan, log and frame dwelling with a central-passage plan. During the 1820s. it was the residence of Congressman and diplomat John Pendleton.

It was listed on the National Register of Historic Places in 1989.
