= Slaughter–Hill Ranch =

- U.S. National Register of Historic Places
- NM State Register of Cultural Properties
- Location within New Mexico Location within the United States
- Location: 1601 E. Second St., Roswell, New Mexico
- Coordinates: 33°23′52″N 104°29′47″W
- Area: less than one acre
- Architectural style: Log Cabin
- MPS: Roswell New Mexico MRA
- NRHP reference No.: 85003640
- NMSRCP No.: 1012

Significant dates
- Added to NRHP: August 29, 1988
- Designated NMSRCP: June 8, 1984

This is about the house and ranch in New Mexico. For the similarly named house in Virginia, please see Slaughter–Hill House

The Slaughter–Hill Ranch, in Roswell, New Mexico, also known as Cunningham Homestead, Estancia Pavo Real, or the Canning Farm, was listed on the National Register of Historic Places in 1988.

It was the first homestead of Sam Cunningham, from Missouri, who built the hand-hewn log house. The building is the only surviving example of a hand-hewn log first homestead in the Roswell area.

The ranch is significant also for association with C.C. Slaughter, a Texas cattleman who established a registered Hereford cattle herd here of national reputation.

After C.C. Slaughter died in 1919, ownership of the property eventually went to George Slaughter's daughter Eloise and her husband Curtis Hill, a lawyer.

== See also ==
- National Register of Historic Places listings in Chaves County, New Mexico
