= A. P. Hill Boyhood Home =

Historic house in Virginia, United States

- U.S. National Register of Historic Places
- U.S. Historic district – Contributing property
- Virginia Landmarks Register
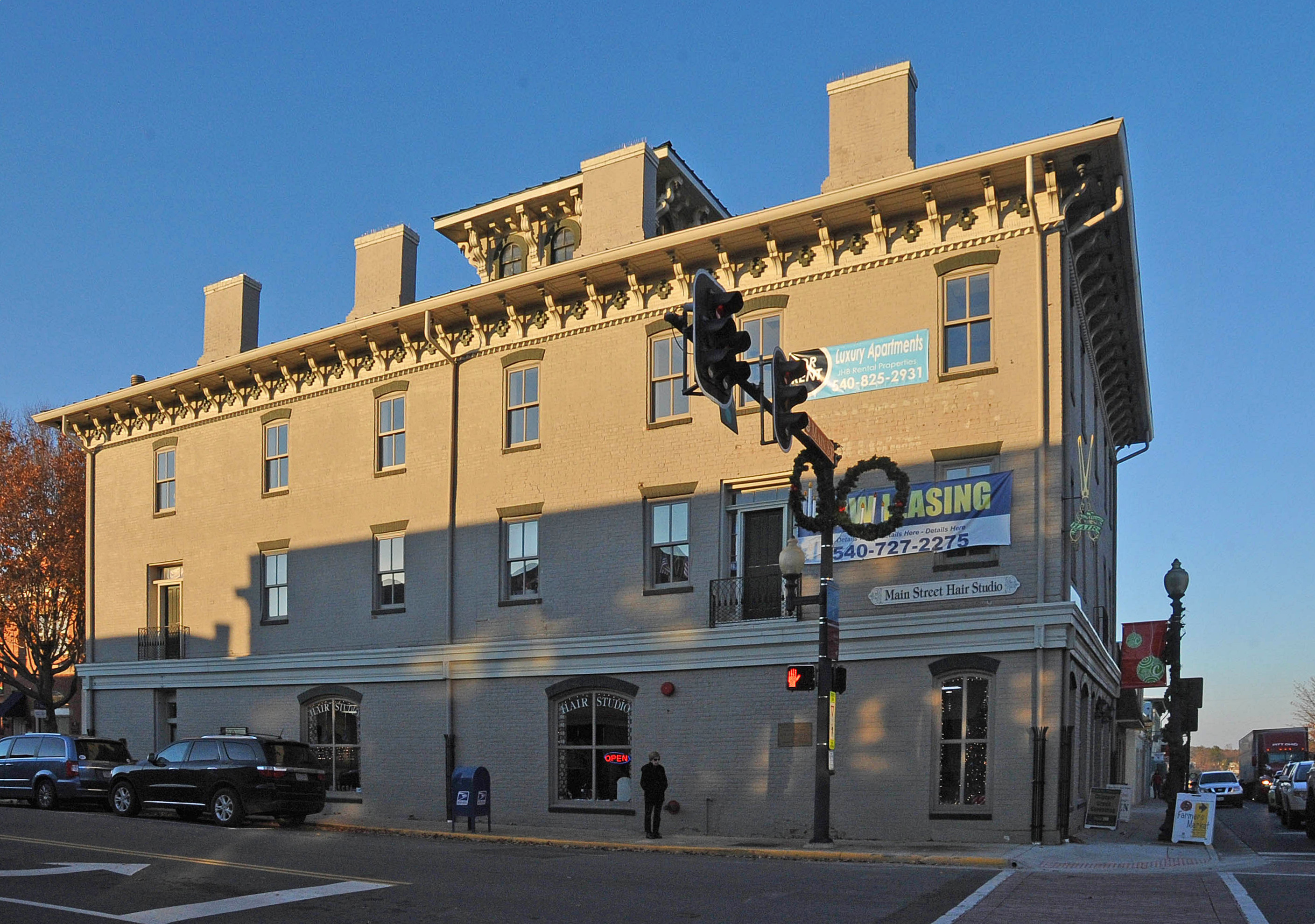
- A. P. Hill Boyhood Home, May 2008

- Location within Virginia Location within the United States
- Location: 102 N. Main St., Culpeper, Virginia
- Coordinates: 38°28′24″N 77°59′47″W
- Area: 1 acre (0.40 ha)
- Built: c. 1820, c. 1860
- Architectural style: Italian Villa, Federal, Tuscan villa
- NRHP reference No.: 73002006
- VLR No.: 204-0006

Significant dates
- Added to NRHP: October 2, 1973
- Designated VLR: June 19, 1973

A. P. Hill Boyhood Home is a historic home located at Culpeper, Culpeper County, Virginia, United States.

== History ==
The original section was built about 1820, and enlarged to its present size about 1860. It is a three-story, five bay by seven bay, brick building in the Tuscan villa style townhouse. It was originally three bays deep, but enlarged to seven bays just before the American Civil War. It was built by Revolutionary War General Edward Stevens, then purchased by the father of General A. P. Hill in 1832. It housed a dwelling and store. The Hill family sold the property in 1862.

It was listed on the National Register of Historic Places in 1973. It is located in the Culpeper Historic District.

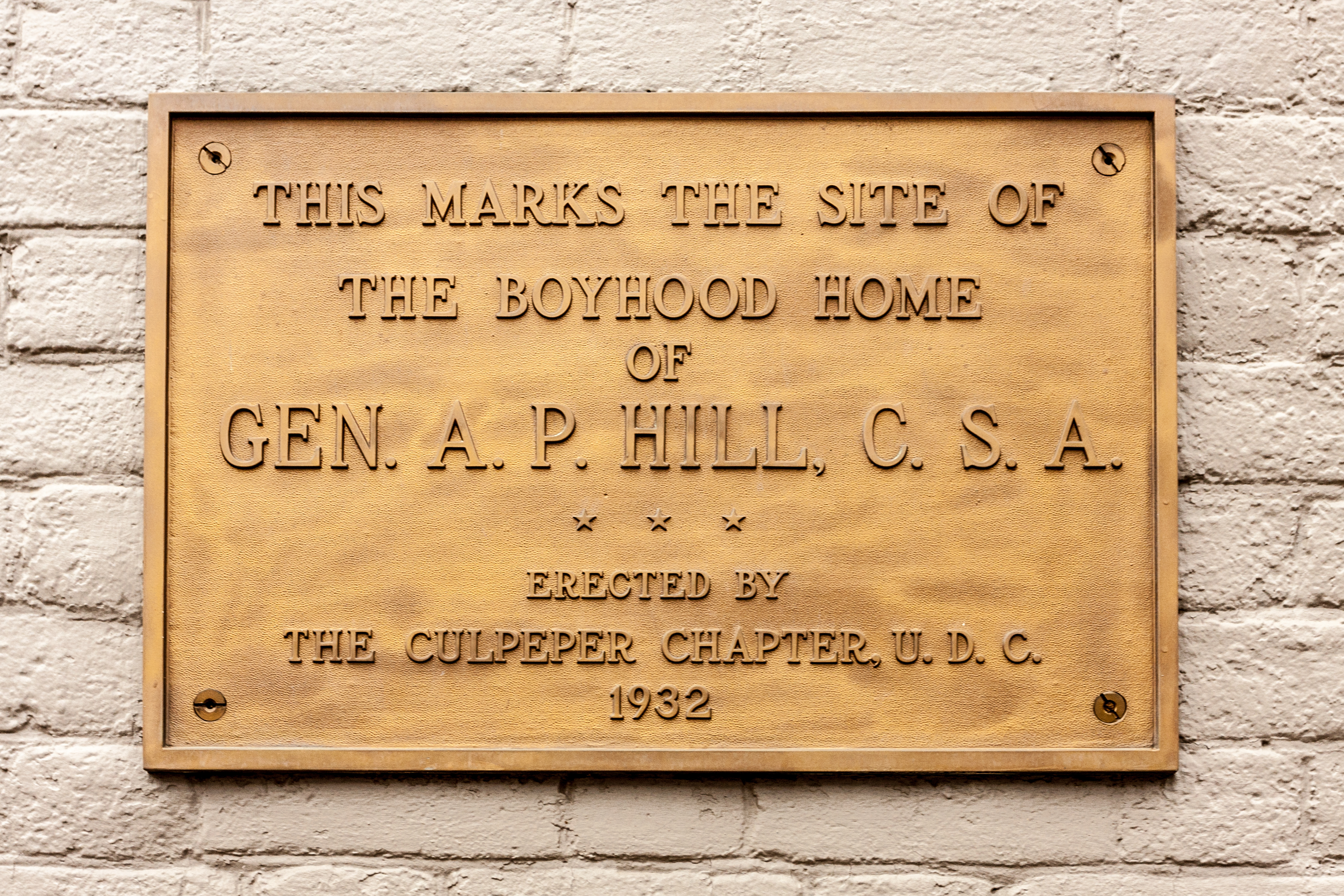
