= Times Community Media =

- Type: Weekly newspaper
- Format: Broadsheet
- Publisher: Arthur W. Arundel
- Language: English
- Headquarters: Herndon, Virginia, Virginia
- Website: www.timescommunity.com

Times Community Media (TCM) is a group of contiguous weeklies in Northern Virginia, United States, and the Piedmont, United States.

Based in Herndon, Virginia, the newspaper group provides local news in the Virginia suburbs outside Washington, D.C. With more than 200 years of local newspaper history, the company grew by focusing on local news. As of 2008, the Times Community Newspapers 240,000 households in Northern Virginia. TCM is a co-owner of the Washington Suburban Press Network, which is also a group of regional community newspapers.

In 1962, the company was founded by Arthur W. Arundel. Arundel purchased the 165-year-old Loudoun Times-Mirror in Leesburg in 1963. The company has grown ever since, and now owns the following newspapers:

- Culpeper Times
- Fauquier Times (formerly called Fauquier Times-Democrat)
- The Gainesville Times
- Loudoun Times-Mirror
