= Culpeper, Virginia =

Culpeper
- Town
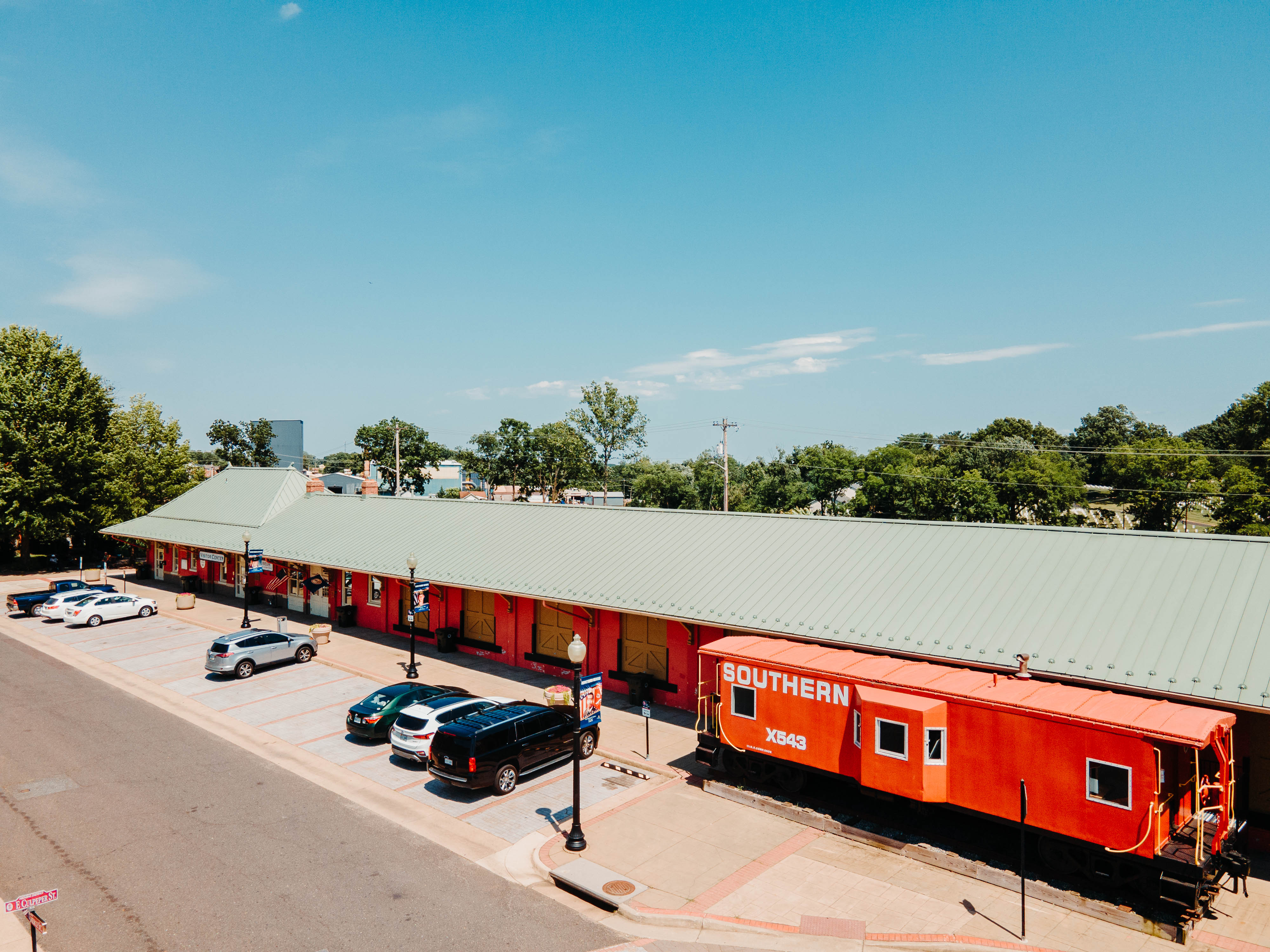
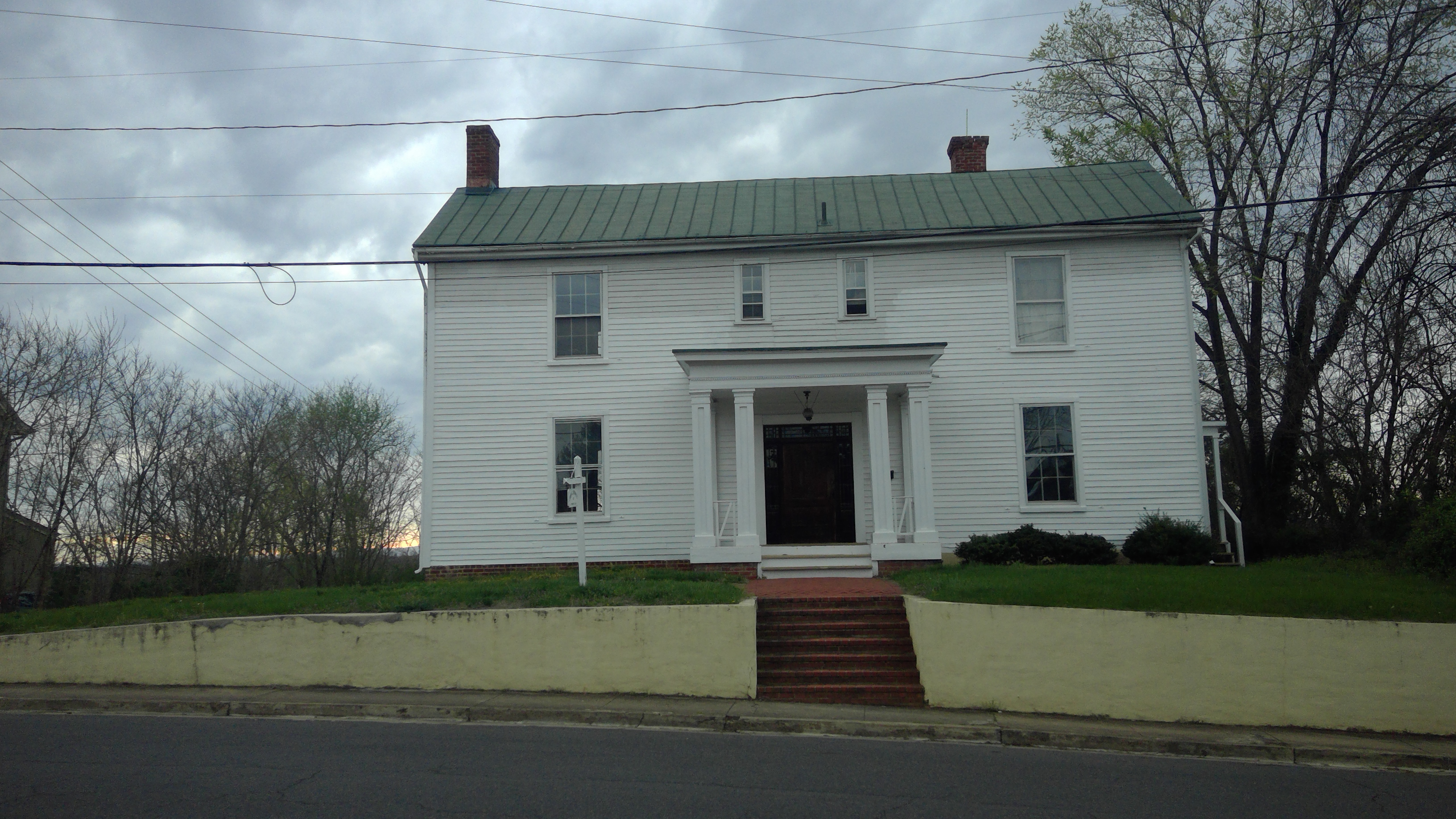
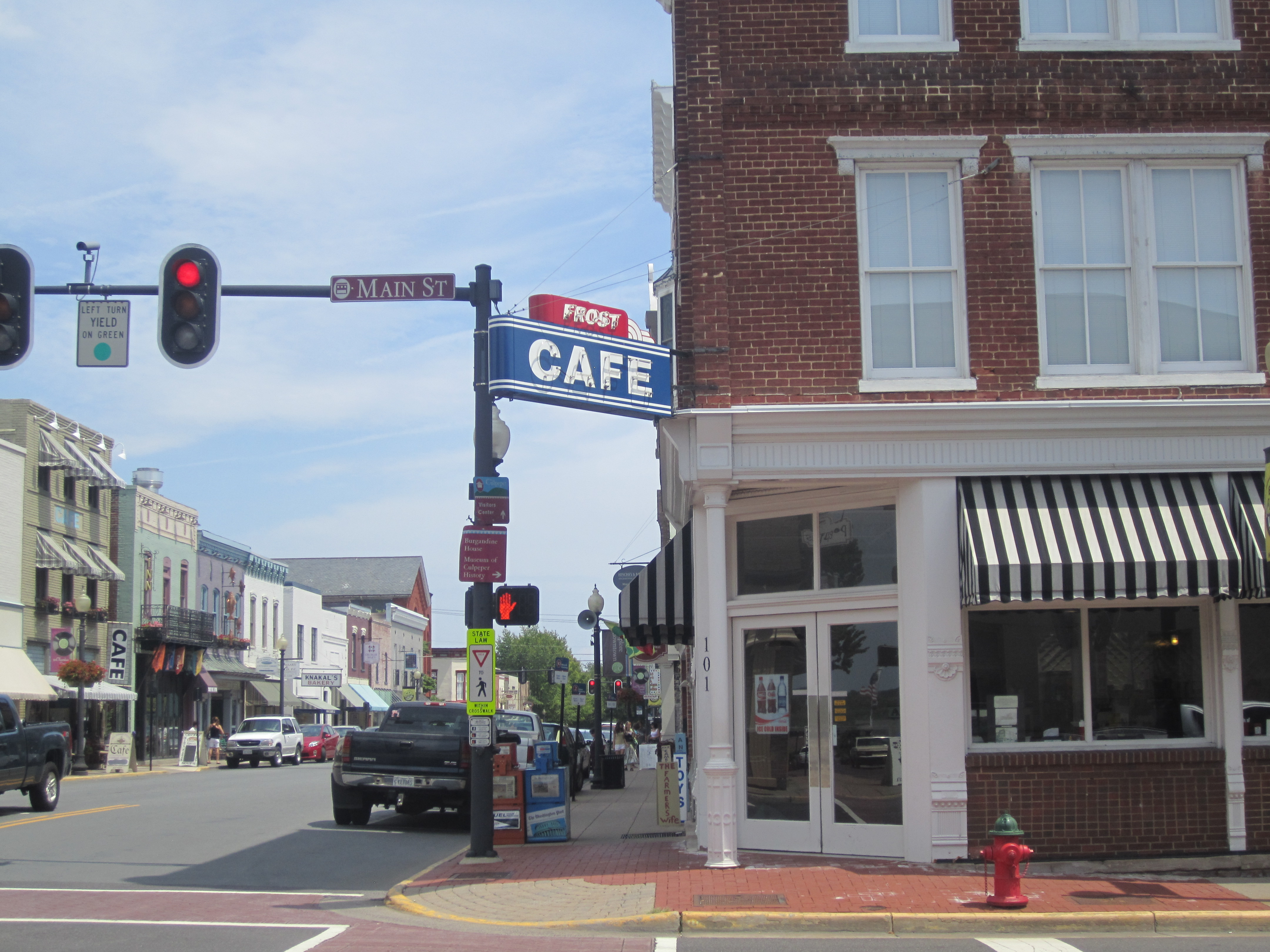
- Culpeper station Slaughter–Hill House Main Street in Downtown Culpeper

- Seal
- Motto: "Preserving the Past, Embracing the Future"
- Interactive map of Culpeper
- Location in Virginia Culpeper (the United States)
- Coordinates: 38°28′23″N 77°59′48″W
- Country: United States
- State: Virginia
- County: Culpeper
- Founded: 1759

Government
  - Type: Council-manager
  - Mayor: Frank Reaves Jr. (Ind.)
  - Council members: Council members: Jamie Dyke; Michael T. Olinger; Pranas A. Rimeikis; Jon D. Russell; JanieSchmidt; Joe Short (vice mayor); Max Sternberg; William M. Yowell
  - Town manager: Chris Hively

Area
  - Town: 7.32 sq mi (18.96 km^{2})
  - Land: 7.28 sq mi (18.85 km^{2})
  - Water: 0.042 sq mi (0.11 km^{2})
  - Urban: 9.4 sq mi (24 km^{2})
- Elevation: 420 ft (130 m)

Population (2020)
  - Town: 20,062
  - Estimate (2025): 22,074
  - Density: 2,757/sq mi (1,064/km^{2})
  - Urban: 23,233
  - Urban density: 2,479/sq mi (957/km^{2})
- Time zone: UTC−5 (Eastern (EST))
  - Summer (DST): UTC−4 (EDT)
- ZIP Codes: 22701, 22735
- Area code: 540
- FIPS code: 51-20752
- GNIS feature ID: 1498471
- Website: www.culpeperva.gov

Culpeper (formerly Culpeper Courthouse, earlier Fairfax) is an incorporated town in Culpeper County, Virginia, United States. It is the county seat and part of the Washington–Baltimore combined statistical area. At the 2020 United States Census, the population was 20,062, an increase from 16,379 in 2010. Culpeper is located along U.S. Route 15, U.S. Route 29, and U.S. Route 522, and is served by intercity passenger rail at Culpeper station and by local and regional bus services operated by Virginia Regional Transit and the Virginia Breeze network.

The town was laid out in 1749 by a young George Washington while working as a surveyor for Lord Fairfax, and formally established in 1759 by the Virginia House of Burgesses under the name Fairfax. During the American Revolutionary War, the Culpeper Minutemen militia organized here in 1775. In the American Civil War, Culpeper was occupied by both Union and Confederate forces due to its strategic position along the Orange and Alexandria Railroad, and the surrounding county saw engagements including the Battle of Brandy Station, the largest cavalry battle of the war and the largest that had ever occurred in North America, as well as the Battle of Cedar Mountain.

In the late 19th and 20th centuries, Culpeper grew as a regional rail and market center. A major cultural landmark is the Packard Campus for Audio-Visual Conservation, opened by the Library of Congress in 1997 on the site of a former Federal Reserve facility. Culpeper has also been affected by modern events such as the 2011 Virginia earthquake, which damaged downtown structures, and recent technology-related investment, including data centers within the Culpeper Technology Zone.

== History ==
=== Presence of indigenous groups ===
At the time of European encounter, the inhabitants of future Culpeper County were a Siouan-speaking sub-group of the Manahoac tribe called the Tegninateo, allies to the Monacans and other central Virginian tribes further west. Captain John Smith mapped the area between the Rappahannock and Rapidan rivers in 1608, locating 4 Sioux villages therein.

=== Early European settlement ===
In 1649, the 629,000-acre Northern Neck Proprietary was established by King Charles II as a one-seventh partition of the Crown's holdings in North America. The original recipient of this territory was John Colepeper, 1st Baron Colepeper of Thoresway. Upon his passing, control of the territory was transferred to his son, Thomas Colepeper, the 2nd Baron; in 1688 he received a new patent from King James verifying his claim to the territory, but died the following year. 5/6th of his share of the colony was inherited by his daughter, Catherine Culpeper, and her husband Thomas Fairfax, 5th Lord Fairfax of Cameron. Upon his death in 1710, control of the territory passed on to his son Thomas, the 6th Lord. The death of his grandmother in May of that year left him the remaining sixth share. Given that he was only 16 at the time, administrative authority fell to his mother, who would maintain it until her death in 1719, when the whole of the proprietary was passed on to Thomas.

By the early 18th century, settlers from the Tidewater and Northern Neck regions began pushing westward into the Piedmont. German, English, and Scots-Irish colonists established farms along the Rapidan and Crooked Run valleys between 1714 and 1720 as part of the Germanna Colony settlement founded by Governor Alexander Spotswood. At the time of its founding, it was colonial Virginia's westernmost settlement. These settlers built homesteads, mills, and trading routes that later became part of Culpeper County. The region’s fertile soil supported wheat, corn, and tobacco cultivation, while trade developed along wagon roads connecting Fredericksburg to the Shenandoah Valley.

=== Founding and colonial period ===
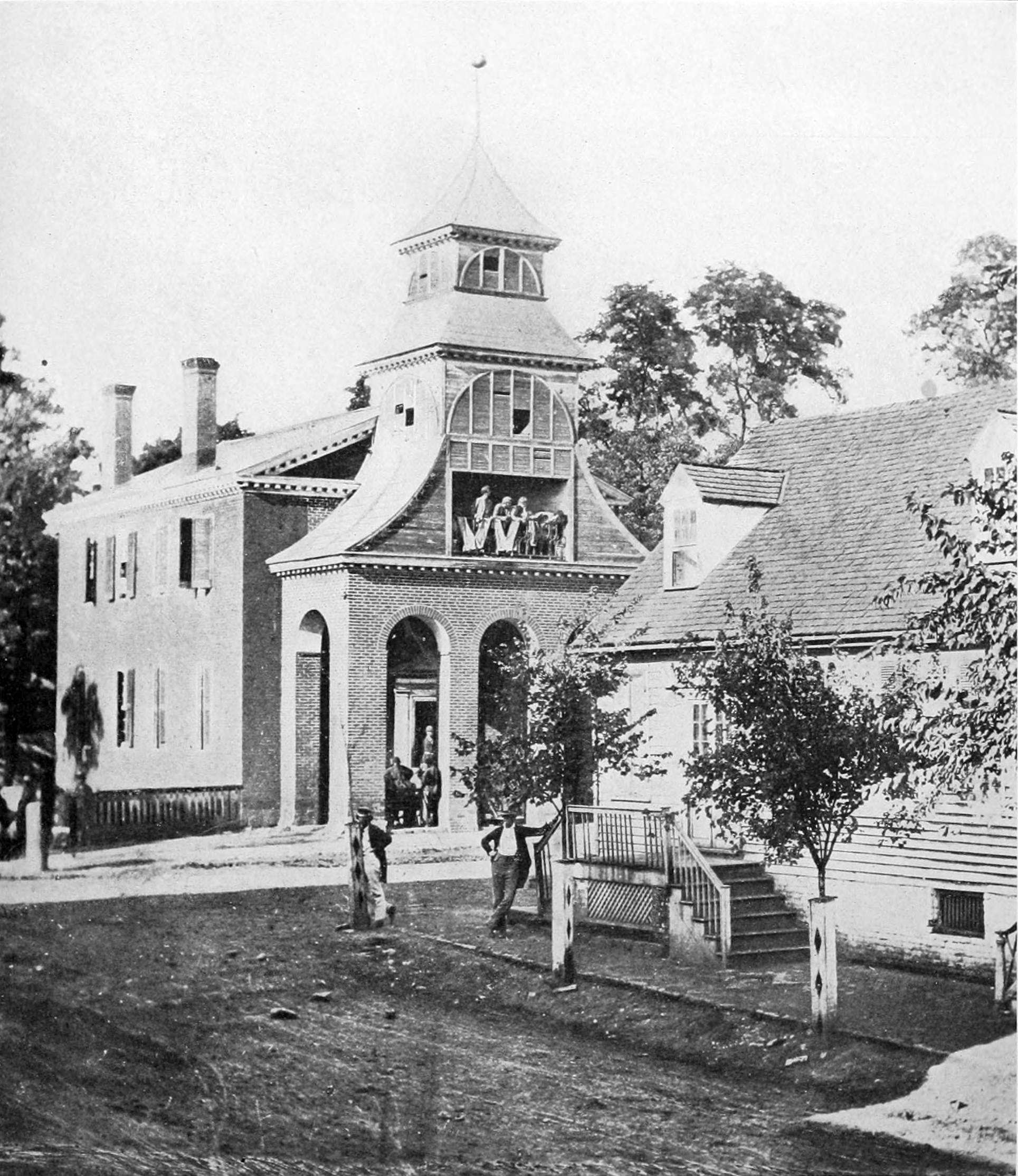
Culpeper Courthouse during the Confederacy, August 1862

In 1748, the Virginia House of Burgesses formally created Culpeper County from Orange County, effective May 17, 1749. It originally included what are now Madison and Rappahannock counties (split off in 1792 and 1831 respectively). Former Governor Thomas Colepeper is often cited as the namesake for the county, but the county may also have been named to honor Catherine Culpeper and the landowning Culpeper family.

After Culpeper County was established, the Virginia House of Burgesses voted on February 22, 1759, to create the Town of Fairfax. The name honored Thomas Fairfax, the 6th Lord.

The original plan for the town included ten square blocks forming the present downtown grid. The layout was surveyed in 1749 by a young George Washington, who was then employed by Lord Fairfax to map the Northern Neck proprietary lands.

During the colonial period, Culpeper became a small market town centered around tobacco warehouses, taverns, and blacksmith shops. Roads linking Fredericksburg to the Shenandoah Valley increased its commercial importance. Slave patrols were active as early as 1763, "scouring" the county to scrutinize the freedman status or travelling rights of itinerant blacks.

In 1765, 16 of the 20 justices of Culpeper Courthouse resigned their commissions in protest of Britain's imposition of the Stamp Act. During the Revolutionary War, local residents organized the Culpeper Minutemen militia in 1775 at Clayton’s Old Field, now Yowell Meadow Park, under an oak tree. Their green hunting shirts, emblazoned with “Liberty or Death” and a coiled rattlesnake, was used as a symbol of Virginia’s independence movement. The unit fought at the Battle of Great Bridge and later joined the 3rd Virginia Regiment.

=== American independence and the Antebellum Period ===
The first postmaster in Culpeper (then Fairfax) was installed in 1795. Mail was regularly erroneously sent to Fairfax County on account of their shared name. The first state-chartered educational institution was established in the county in 1802, its first newspaper, The Culpeper Gazette, was founded in 1827. Culpeper’s central location in the Piedmont made it a crossroad for commerce and transportation in the early 1800s. Taverns, blacksmith shops, and wagon yards surrounded the courthouse square, and by the 1850s the arrival of the Orange and Alexandria Railroad connected the town with Alexandria and Gordonsville.

In the leadup to the secession of the Confederacy, Culpeper County would endorse John Bell of the Constitutional Union Party over John C. Breckinridge of the Southern Democrats by a single vote, but would ultimately endorse secession at the Virginia Convention in 1861. Culpeper residents would organize in 1860 under the same flag and banner and at the same location that they had at the outset of the Revolutionary War. More than half the county's population was African-American at that time.

During the American Civil War, Culpeper and the surrounding county became strategically important for both Union and Confederate forces. The narrowing of the Rappahannock River along Culpeper County's northern border made the county one of the most ideal locations for an invasion of Virginia by Union forces. During the initial period of Confederate control, Culpeper Courthouse was host to an army hospital, training camp, and supply base (beginning in 1862). The town changed hands more than sixty times between 1861 and 1865, serving alternately as headquarters for Confederate General Robert E. Lee and Union General George G. Meade.

The nearby Battle of Brandy Station on June 9, 1863, remains the largest cavalry engagement of the war, while the Battle of Cedar Mountain (August 1862) and the Battle of Kelly's Ford (March 1863) further established Culpeper’s wartime importance. After Brandy Station, Culpeper served as the launching point for Lee's forces into the Gettysburg Campaign. Later that year, the Confederates were pushed out of the county by the Army of the Potomac in two successive stages. The first occurred in September, when Union forces under Brig. Generals Kilpatrick and Custer captured Culpeper's train depot and pushed the forces of Maj. Gen. J.E.B. Stuart south of the Rapidan River in the Battle of Culpeper Courthouse. Thereafter, Lee's forces engaged in a flanking maneuver against Gen. Meade along the mountainous western edge of the county, leading to a Union retreat towards Centreville; Union forces would rout the offensive, leading Lee to slowly withdraw south towards the Rappahannock. On the night of November 7, Union forces carried out a shock offensive against Lee's fortified positions on the north bank of the river, overwhelming Confederate forces, forcing them to once again retreat south of the Rapidan, and leading to the recapture of Culpeper Count by the Union. Their winter occupation of Culpeper, immediately followed by the Overland Campaign, is considered to have been the largest occupation by either side over the course of the entire war.

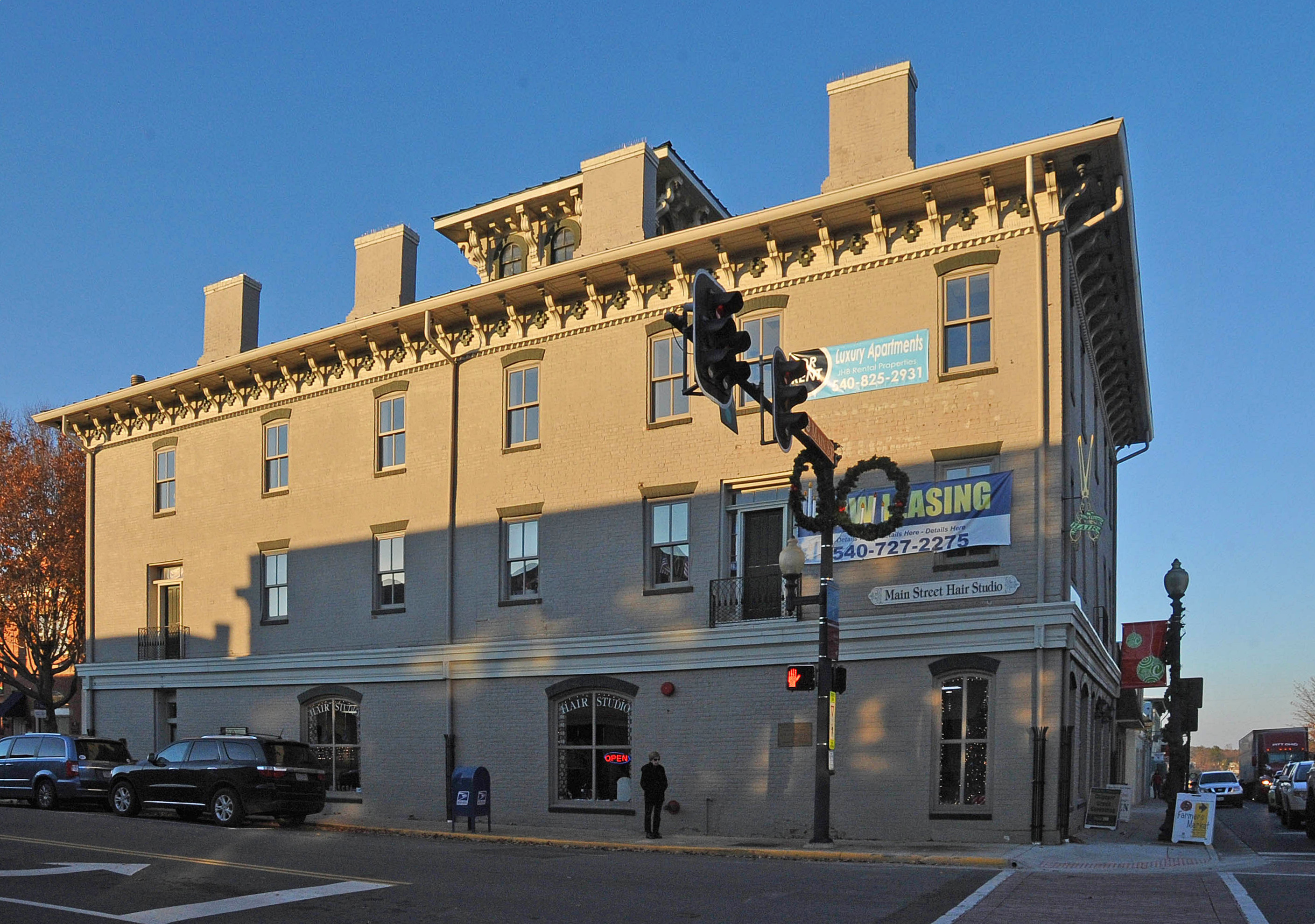
Childhood home of Confederate General A. P. Hill, born and raised in Culpeper. His body was authorized by his indirect descendants to be moved, alongside a statue it sat underneath at a Richmond intersection, to Fairview Cemetery in Culpeper after a court battle brought by Richmond city officials.

President Abraham Lincoln visited Culpeper twice during the war, inspecting Union camps in 1862 and again in 1864. Confederate scout networks operated in the area, including the Brandy Station Signal Corps, which gathered intelligence for Lee’s army.

The courthouse and much of the town suffered extensive damage during repeated occupations. Following the Confederate surrender, Culpeper was rechartered in 1869. The Reconstruction era saw the rise of new civic and religious institutions established by formerly enslaved residents, including churches, the Culpeper Colored School (1903), and St. Stephen’s Industrial School for vocational training.

=== Post-Civil War and twentieth century modernization ===
In 1870, a fire destroyed the courthouse and several surrounding structures, prompting a wave of rebuilding that shaped the modern downtown’s brick architecture. By the early 1900s, Culpeper featured hotels, banks, a trolley line, and telegraph offices. The agricultural economy remained dominant through the Great Depression, but the town also supported canneries, lumber operations, and small textile mills.

During the 1930s, New Deal programs such as the WPA constructed sidewalks, bridges, and schools still in use today. World War II brought further change, with the nearby Culpeper National Cemetery expanded and military training grounds created in surrounding counties. After the war, population growth and automobile travel shifted commerce toward the U.S. Route 29 and U.S. Route 15 corridors.

During the mid-20th century, Culpeper modernized municipal services, built new schools, and participated in regional planning initiatives. In the 1950s, local residents took part in early desegregation efforts at Culpeper High School, covered by the *Charlottesville-Albemarle Tribune* and *Free Lance Star* newspapers. The 1970s saw downtown revitalization and historic preservation programs led by the Choral Society and American Legion, preserving many 19th-century structures.

=== Cold War and recent history ===
During the Cold War, the U.S. Federal Reserve built an underground bunker southeast of town in 1969 as a continuity-of-government site. In 1997, the Library of Congress converted the facility into the National Audiovisual Conservation Center, known as the Packard Campus.

On August 23, 2011, Culpeper was impacted by the 2011 Virginia earthquake, which damaged several historic buildings along Main and East Davis streets. The Museum of Culpeper History relocated in 2014 to the town’s historic depot building, expanding exhibits on local archaeology and wartime heritage.

The early 21st century brought a combination of growth and preservation. The American Planning Association recognized East Davis Street in 2011 as one of "America’s Great Places" for its preserved architecture and active local economy.

In 2024, the state opened Culpeper Battlefields State Park, protecting portions of the Brandy Station and Cedar Mountain battlefields for public use.

Economic diversification has continued with technology and tourism sectors growing in importance. The county’s Department of Economic Development received six Excellence in Economic Development Awards from the International Economic Development Council in 2025. Preservation groups have also continued advocating for balance between new development, including proposed data centers and solar installations, and the protection of historic landscapes.

=== Notable events ===
- Culpeper was the location of the main encampment for the Army of the Potomac during the winter of 1863-64 during the Civil War. It was from Culpeper that General Ulysses S. Grant began the Overland Campaign against General Robert E. Lee's Army of Northern Virginia.
- During the presidential election campaign of 1960, vice presidential nominee Lyndon B. Johnson began his whistle-stop campaign of the South by giving a speech at Culpeper. As the train was pulling away from the station, Johnson yelled out a phrase that would become a battle cry of the campaign: "What did Dick Nixon ever do for Culpeper?!"
- In 1967, it was the site of a one-day standoff between members of the American Nazi Party and police and military personnel over the group's attempt to bury their leader George Lincoln Rockwell in the local National Cemetery.
- In 1995, former Superman star Christopher Reeve lost his balance during a horse competition and fell, resulting in severe spinal injury and permanent quadriplegic paralysis.
- On June 14, 2025, during a No Kings protest in Culpeper, a motorist drove into a crowd of demonstrators. According to police reports, at least one person was struck by the vehicle; however, no serious injuries were confirmed at the time, and the individual was not immediately located. The incident led to the arrest of the driver and drew local attention to tensions surrounding the protest movement.

== Geography ==
Culpeper is in the Piedmont region of Virginia, approximately 70 miles (113 km) southwest of Washington, D.C. and 50 miles (80 km) north of Richmond. The town lies at the intersection of U.S. Route 29 and U.S. Route 15, two major highways that provide important access to central and northern Virginia. According to the United States Census Bureau, the town of Culpeper has a total area of 7.32 square miles (18.96 km²), of which 7.28 square miles (18.85 km²) is land and 0.04 square miles (0.11 km²), or 0.55%, is water.

=== Topography ===
Culpeper’s terrain is characterized by rolling hills within the Piedmont Plateau, in the foothills of the Blue Ridge Mountains. Elevation ranges from about 300 feet in the east to nearly 600 feet in the west. The county is bounded by the Rappahannock River to the north and the Rapidan River to the south.

=== Neighborhoods ===
Residential and cultural life centers around a number of historic and modern neighborhoods. The area known as “Fishtown,” located along Commerce Street, Waters Place, and Locust Street, developed as a business and residential district with a strong African American community presence. Nearby enclaves included Tin Cup Alley, Whipple Alley, Slabtown, Jeffrey Town, and Sugar Bottom.

=== Townscape ===
The central business district is largely encompassed by the Culpeper Historic District, a 50-acre area established in 1982 to preserve the town’s architectural and historic character. Buildings within the district are subject to review by the town’s Architectural Review Board for exterior changes visible from public streets. Within downtown, “The Wharf,” at the lower end of East Davis Street, historically served as a center for freight, services, and commercial activity, complementing the residential and business mix of Fishtown.

=== Climate ===
Culpeper has a humid subtropical climate (Köppen Cfa), with very warm, humid summers and cool winters. Precipitation is abundant and well spread (although the summer months are usually wetter), with an annual average of 45.19 in (1,148 mm).

Climate data for Culpeper, Virginia
Month	Jan	Feb	Mar	Apr	May	Jun	Jul	Aug	Sep	Oct	Nov	Dec	Year
Record high °F (°C)	80 (27)	84 (29)	91 (33)	95 (35)	100 (38)	103 (39)	107 (42)	102 (39)	102 (39)	99 (37)	86 (30)	79 (26)	107 (42)
Mean daily maximum °F (°C)	45 (7)	49 (9)	60 (16)	70 (21)	79 (26)	86 (30)	90 (32)	87 (31)	81 (27)	70 (21)	59 (15)	48 (9)	69 (20)
Mean daily minimum °F (°C)	25 (−4)	28 (−2)	34 (1)	43 (6)	52 (11)	61 (16)	66 (19)	64 (18)	58 (14)	45 (7)	37 (3)	29 (−2)	45 (7)
Record low °F (°C)	−14 (−26)	−9 (−23)	5 (−15)	18 (−8)	28 (−2)	37 (3)	48 (9)	44 (7)	31 (−1)	18 (−8)	6 (−14)	−6 (−21)	−14 (−26)
Average precipitation inches (mm)	3.26 (83)	2.96 (75)	3.55 (90)	3.32 (84)	4.34 (110)	4.39 (112)	4.23 (107)	4.13 (105)	4.36 (111)	3.81 (97)	3.71 (94)	3.13 (80)	45.19 (1,148)

== Demographics ==
Historical population
Census	Pop.	Note	%±
1860	1,056		—
1870	1,800		70.5%
1880	1,613		−10.4%
1890	1,620		0.4%
1900	1,618		−0.1%
1910	1,796		11.0%
1920	1,819		1.3%
1930	2,379		30.8%
1940	2,316		−2.6%
1950	2,527		9.1%
1960	2,412		−4.6%
1970	6,056		151.1%
1980	6,621		9.3%
1990	8,581		29.6%
2000	9,664		12.6%
2010	16,379		69.5%
2020	20,062		22.5%
U.S. Decennial Census

=== 2020 census ===
As of the 2020 census, Culpeper had a population of 20,062. The median age was 34.2 years. 28.8% of residents were under the age of 18 and 12.4% of residents were 65 years of age or older. For every 100 females there were 93.1 males, and for every 100 females age 18 and over there were 89.7 males age 18 and over.

Residents aged 18 to 24 accounted for 8.8% of the population, those aged 25 to 44 accounted for 28.4%, and those aged 45 to 64 accounted for 21.6%. The non-Hispanic White population was 49.3%.

100.0% of residents lived in urban areas, while 0.0% lived in rural areas.

There were 6,753 households in Culpeper, of which 41.9% had children under the age of 18 living in them. Of all households, 44.8% were married-couple households, 16.8% were households with a male householder and no spouse or partner present, and 30.6% were households with a female householder and no spouse or partner present. About 24.3% of all households were made up of individuals and 10.3% had someone living alone who was 65 years of age or older.

There were 7,084 housing units, of which 4.7% were vacant. The homeowner vacancy rate was 0.9% and the rental vacancy rate was 3.8%.

Racial composition as of the 2020 census
Race	Number	Percent
White	10,528	52.5%
Black or African American	3,523	17.6%
American Indian and Alaska Native	249	1.2%
Asian	485	2.4%
Native Hawaiian and Other Pacific Islander	8	0.0%
Some other race	3,027	15.1%
Two or more races	2,242	11.2%
Hispanic or Latino (of any race)	4,994	24.9%

=== Income and poverty ===
According to the 2019–2023 American Community Survey, the median household income in Culpeper was $88,702, and the per capita income was $36,327. Approximately 12.4% of residents were living below the poverty line.

== Economy ==
Culpeper's economy is supported by retail, healthcare, government services, and growing technology interests. The Library of Congress's Packard Campus for Audio-Visual Conservation is located near Culpeper.

In 2022, Amazon Web Services, through its subsidiary Marvell Developments, submitted a proposal for a data center development in Culpeper County that required rezoning of agricultural land for industrial use. The proposal generated public opposition, which was discussed during public hearings held by the Culpeper County Board of Supervisors. In January 2023, the Culpeper County Board of Supervisors approved the rezoning request for the project following public hearings and debate.

== Arts and culture ==
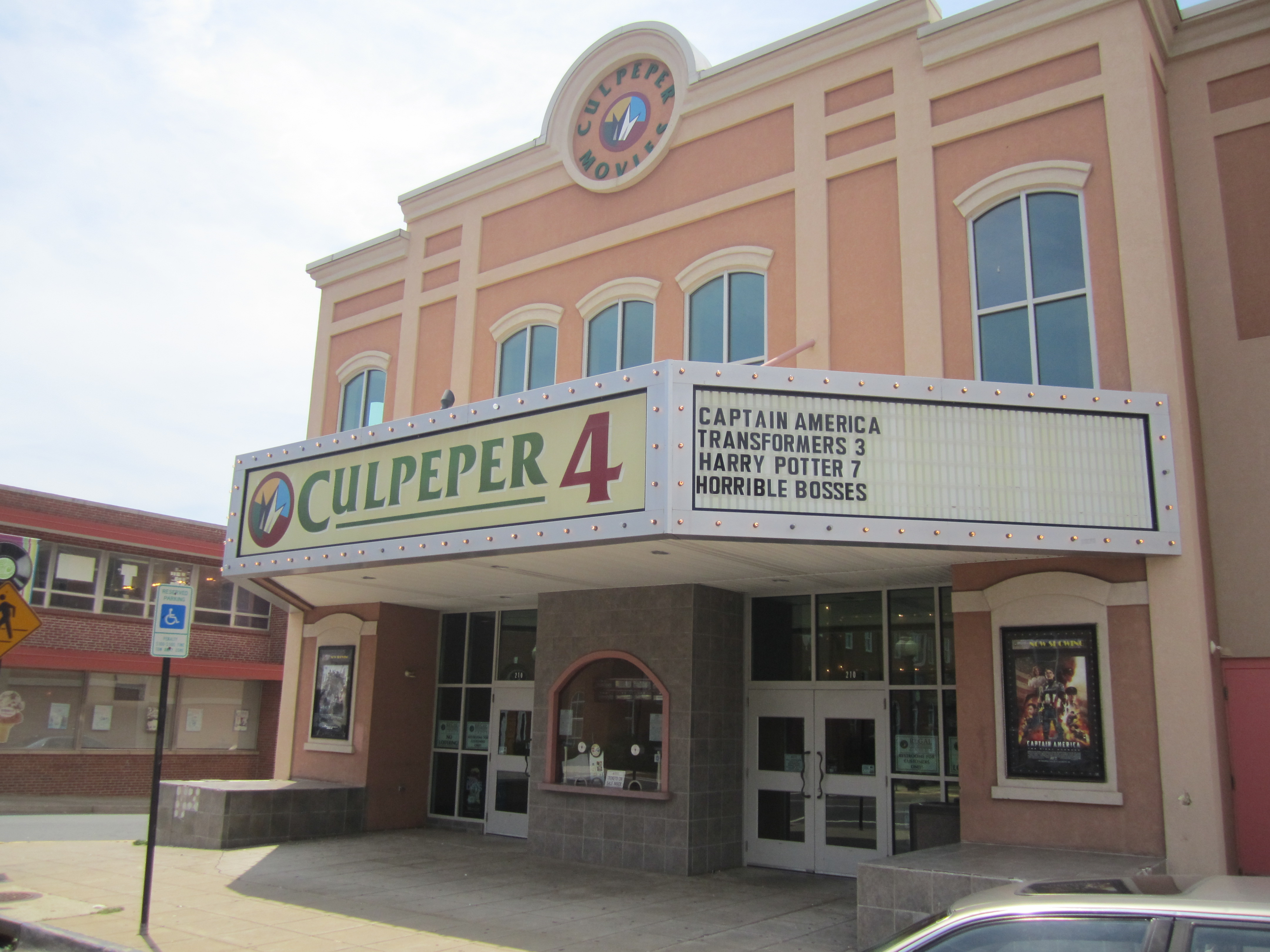
Culpeper Theater

Culpeper hosts several arts and cultural programs, particularly centered in its downtown area. Culpeper Renaissance, Inc., a nonprofit organization, has coordinated public art initiatives such as the Culpeper Downtown Walls Mural Program. Murals include “The Surveyor,” depicting George Washington, and “The Trailblazers,” featuring African American community leaders. In 2024, the initiative expanded to include painted utility boxes throughout the historic district.

The Pitts Theatre, an Art Deco structure built in the late 1930s, was reopened in 2013 as a performing arts venue but closed again in 2016. Its facade remains preserved.

The Library of Congress Packard Campus for Audio‑Visual Conservation, located outside town, offers free film screenings to the public.

Annual events in the area include Culpeperpalooza, a music and vendor festival held in April at Mountain Run Winery.

The Museum of Culpeper History, located in the town's historic train depot, provides exhibits and tours on local history, including the colonial period and the Civil War. Additional historical sites include the Burgandine House.

The Culpeper Library was founded in 1926. In 1996, the library became an agency of the county, and was renamed Culpeper Town and County Library. The library has one branch, located in Culpeper.

== Sports ==
In summer collegiate baseball, the Culpeper Cavaliers joined the Valley Baseball League in 2023. The league, sanctioned by the NCAA and supported by Major League Baseball, features college-level athletes competing across the Shenandoah Valley region.

== Parks and recreation ==
The Culpeper Sports Complex, opened in 2006, receives over 350,000 visitors annually and features multiple athletic fields, including soccer, football, little league baseball, softball and lacrosse.

== Government ==
Culpeper is governed by a nine-member Town Council, consisting of a Mayor and eight Council Members, all elected at-large to four-year terms. The Council appoints a Town Manager, who serves as the chief administrative officer and oversees the daily operations of the town. The Council also appoints the Town Attorney and Town Clerk.

=== Town council ===
As of 2025, the mayor is Frank Reaves Jr.

=== Political leanings ===
Culpeper County, including the Town of Culpeper, has historically leaned Republican in state and federal elections. The last time a Democratic presidential candidate carried the county was in 1964. In the 2020 presidential election, approximately 62% of county voters supported Donald Trump, while about 36% supported Joe Biden.

Culpeper is part of Virginia's 7th congressional district, represented by Democrat Eugene Vindman as of 2025. In the Virginia General Assembly, the town is represented by Republicans in both the House of Delegates and State Senate.

== Education ==
Culpeper is served by the Culpeper County Public Schools district, which covers all public K–12 education in Culpeper County. Within the town limits are several public elementary and middle schools such as Floyd T. Binns Middle, Farmington, Sycamore Park, and Yowell Elementary, while county residents outside town attend schools including A.G. Richardson, Emerald Hill, and Pearl Sample elementary schools, along with Culpeper Middle School.

High school students attend one of two public high schools: Culpeper County High School or Eastern View High School, depending on zoning. The Culpeper Technical Education Center (CTEC) opened in 2021 adjacent to Germanna Community College’s Daniel Technology Center provides vocational and technical programs to students from both high schools, offering hands‑on training and industry credentials in fields like automotive, carpentry, cybersecurity, culinary arts, healthcare, HVAC/R, EMT, and emergency services.

In addition to public schooling, Culpeper County has several private and faith-based institutions such as Culpeper Christian School and Epiphany Catholic School serving pre‑K through high school students with religious-based curricula and smaller class sizes.

== Media ==
=== Print publications ===
The Culpeper Star-Exponent, founded in 1881 as the Culpeper Exponent and merged with the Virginia Star in 1953, is published in broadsheet format, with a print circulation of approximately 2,986 daily and 2,917 Sunday.

The Culpeper Times, a weekly tabloid founded in 1889, has a print circulation around 5,000 copies.

=== Broadcast media ===
Local radio is anchored by several stations. WJMA (103.1 FM) is a country music station licensed to Culpeper, operated by Piedmont Communications since its debut on December 4, 1971. WCVA (1490 AM / 95.3 FM) broadcasts classic hits and was first launched in 1949, also under Piedmont Communications ownership. Additionally, WVCV (1340 AM), though licensed to Orange, Virginia, simulcasts WJMA’s country format and serves Culpeper listeners.

== Infrastructure ==
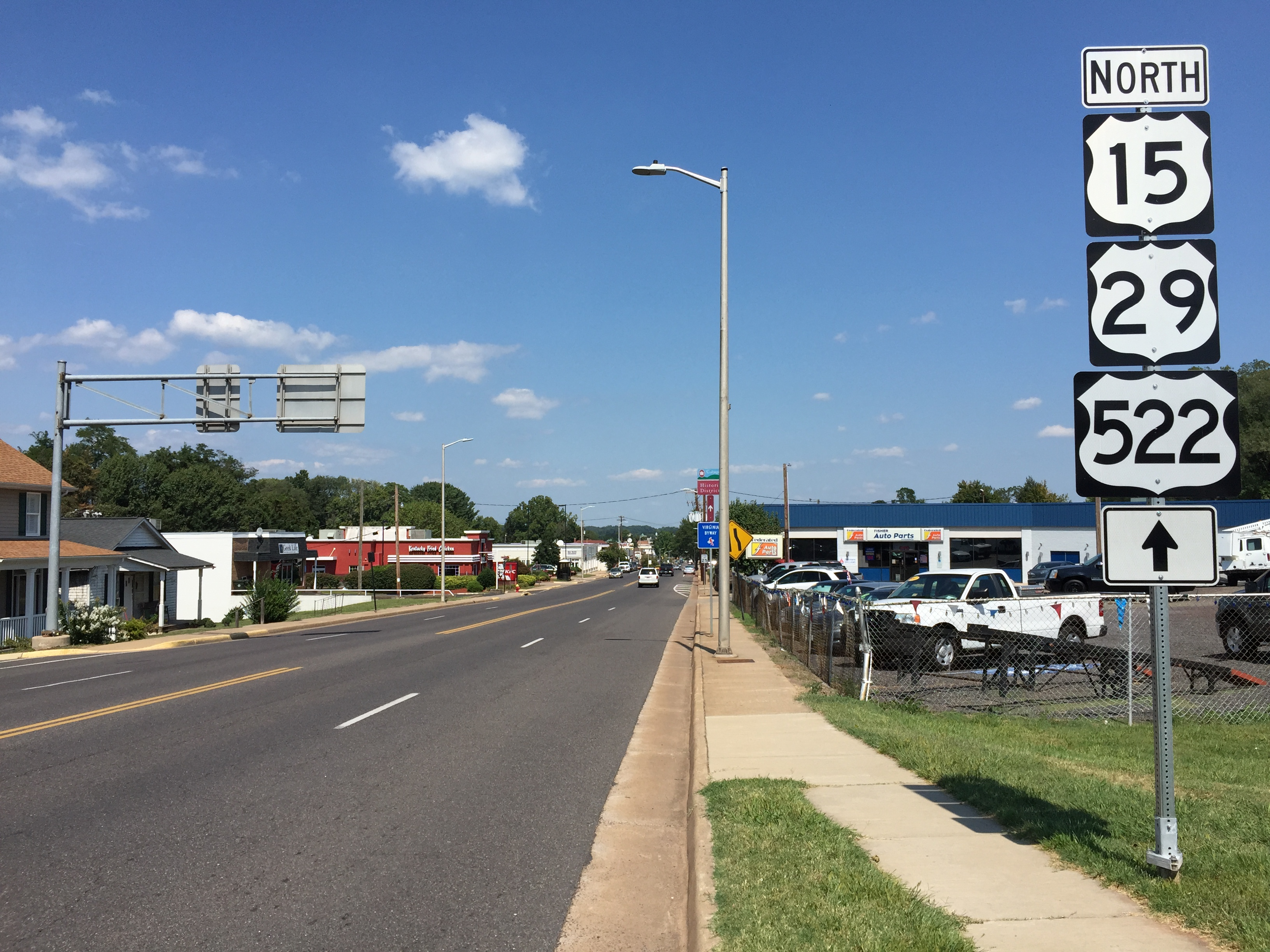
View north along US 15 Bus, US 29 Bus and US 522 in Culpeper

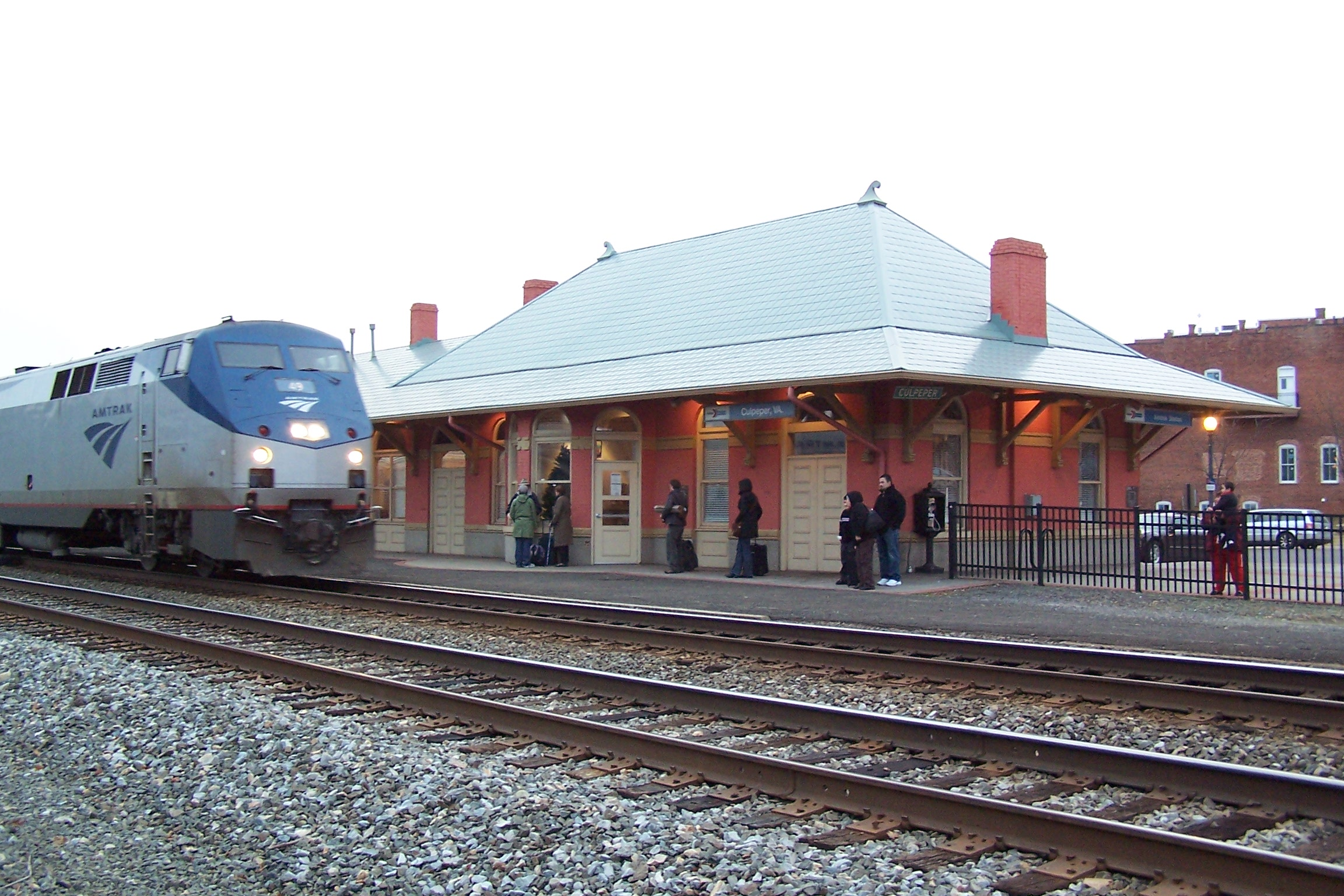
Culpeper Amtrak station, visitor center, and Museum of Culpeper History

=== Transportation ===
==== Roads and highways ====
Highways include:

- U.S. Route 15 Business
- U.S. Route 29 Business
- U.S. Route 522
- Virginia State Route 3
- Virginia State Route 229

Culpeper maintains a locally managed street network under the Virginia Department of Transportation, which oversees maintenance and safety improvements on primary and secondary routes throughout the county.

==== Rail ====
Amtrak operates the Culpeper Station (station code CLP) with daily service by the Cardinal, Northeast Regional and Crescent trains, providing connections to New Orleans, Chicago, Cincinnati, New York and Boston. Approximately 17,386 passengers boarded or alighted at the station in fiscal year 2023.

Freight rail operations also pass through the region as part of the state’s transportation network, providing industrial and logistical connections for local businesses.

==== Public transportation ====
Culpeper is served by Virginia Regional Transit, which operates fixed-route and demand-response bus services within the town and county. The “Culpeper Connector” provides scheduled service around major destinations in town, while the “Culpeper Express” offers countywide curb-to-curb rides with advance reservations.

Additional regional bus service is provided through the Virginia Breeze intercity network, which includes a stop in Culpeper on the Piedmont Express line connecting to Dulles International Airport and Washington, D.C. Limited commuter connections are also available via Academy Bus.

==== Airport ====
Culpeper Regional Airport features a 5,000 ft (1,500 m) runway that supports general aviation traffic, flight training and business aviation. The airport is owned and operated by Culpeper County and offers hangar facilities, fueling services and maintenance support for private and corporate aircraft.

=== Police ===
The Culpeper Police Department was founded in 1956. The department employs 48 sworn officers and nine administrative employees.

== Notable people ==
- William T. Amiger (1870–1929), educator, college president, Baptist minister; born in Culpeper
- Nell Arthur (1837–1880), wife of Chester A. Arthur, who became the 21st president of the United States after her death
- Big Kenny, of the country music group Big & Rich
- John S. Barbour Jr., U.S. congressman (1881–1887) and U.S. senator (1889-1892)
- Andrew J. Boyle, U.S. Army lieutenant general, resided in Culpeper during his retirement
- Robert Young Button, Attorney General of Virginia (1962-1970) and Virginia State Senator (1945-1961)
- Cary Travers Grayson, highly decorated U.S. Navy surgeon, onetime chairman of the American Red Cross, and personal aide to U.S. President Woodrow Wilson
- A. P. Hill (1825–1865), Confederate general during the American Civil War, commander of "Hill's Light Division," under Stonewall Jackson
- John Preston "Pete" Hill, Negro league baseball player and member of the Baseball Hall of Fame, born in nearby Buena, Virginia
- John Jameson (1751–1810), Colonel in the American Revolutionary War
- Ann Jarvis, for whom Mother's Day was established by her daughter Anna Jarvis
- Keith Jennings, former NBA point guard, Golden State Warriors
- George M. Lightfoot (1868–1947) educator, classics scholar
- William Morgan, whose 1826 disappearance in New York state sparked a powerful anti-Freemasonry movement
- Waller T. Patton, Confederate colonel during the American Civil War, great-uncle of World War II General George S. Patton
- John Pendleton, American diplomat
- Eppa Rixey, major league pitcher and member of the Baseball Hall of Fame
- D. French Slaughter Jr., former U.S. Congressman
- Jeannette Walls, author of The Glass Castle
- Maliq Brown - professional basketball player
- Nick Freitas, Green Beret Sergeant, Iraq War; Delegate of Virginia General Assembly
- Gabriel Colvin Wharton, Brigadier General in CSA

== See also ==
- Lord Culpeper Hotel
