= Loudoun Times-Mirror =

- Type: Weekly newspaper
- Format: Tabloid
- Owner: Ogden Newspapers
- Publisher: Geordie Wilson
- Headquarters: Leesburg, Virginia, United States
- Website: loudountimes.com

Loudoun Times-Mirror is a weekly newspaper and news website based in Leesburg, Virginia, owned and operated by Ogden Newspapers. Founded as the Times-Mirror in 1924, the newspaper and its direct predecessors have covered local news, sports, business and community in Loudoun County and Leesburg for more than two centuries.

== History ==
In November 2015, Loudoun Times-Mirror, then owned by Times Community Media, acquired the assets of the weekly newspapers, Leesburg Today, Ashburn Today, and the website leesburgtoday.com.

In July 2018, Ogden acquired the Times-Mirror from Times Community Media, which was owned by the Arundel family. Peter Arundel remained the publisher until March 2020.

As of 2023, the newspaper is delivered via the U.S. Postal Service.
