= Downtown Culpeper =

Historic central business district of Culpeper, Virginia

- Neighborhood and Historic District
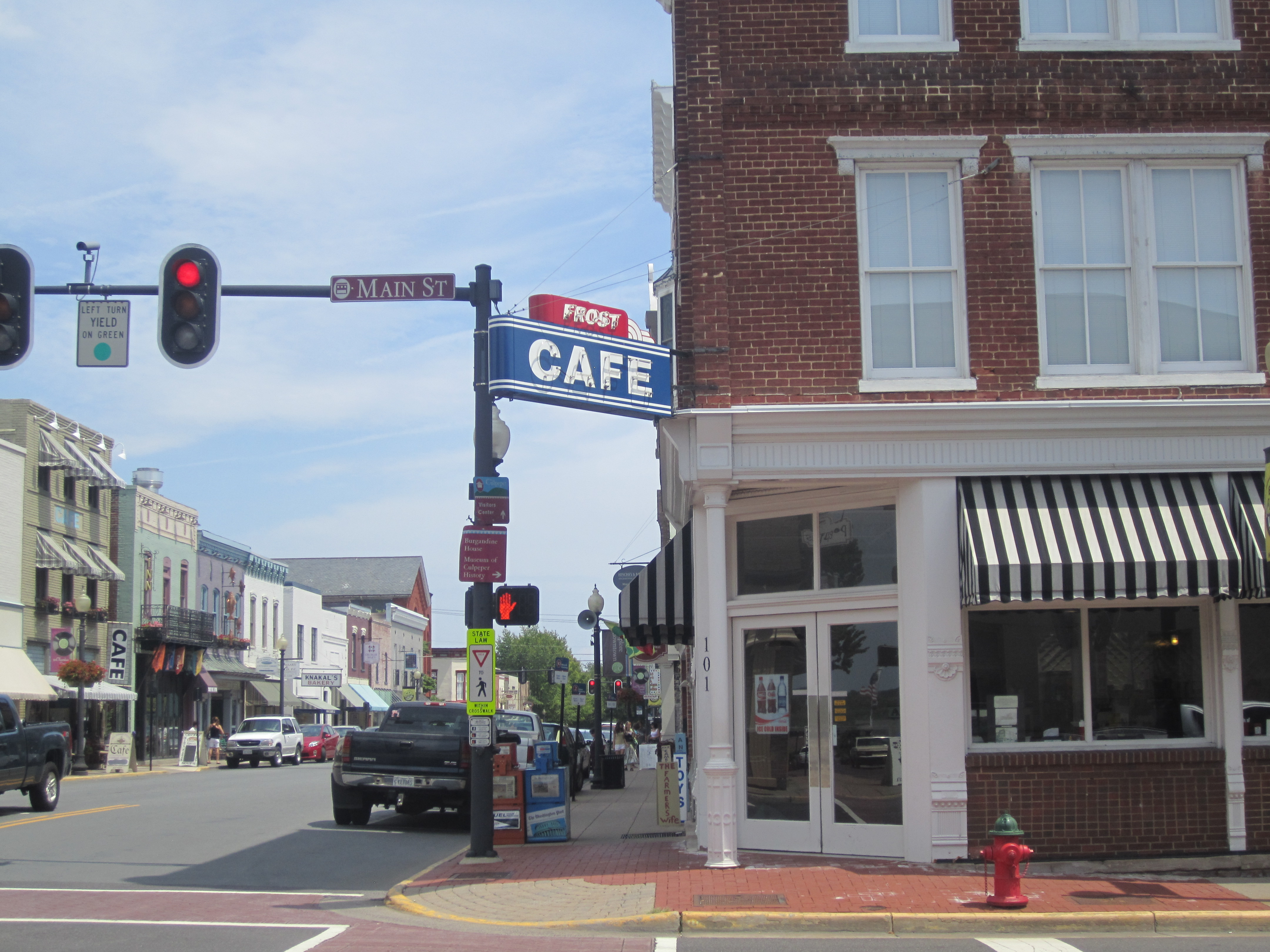
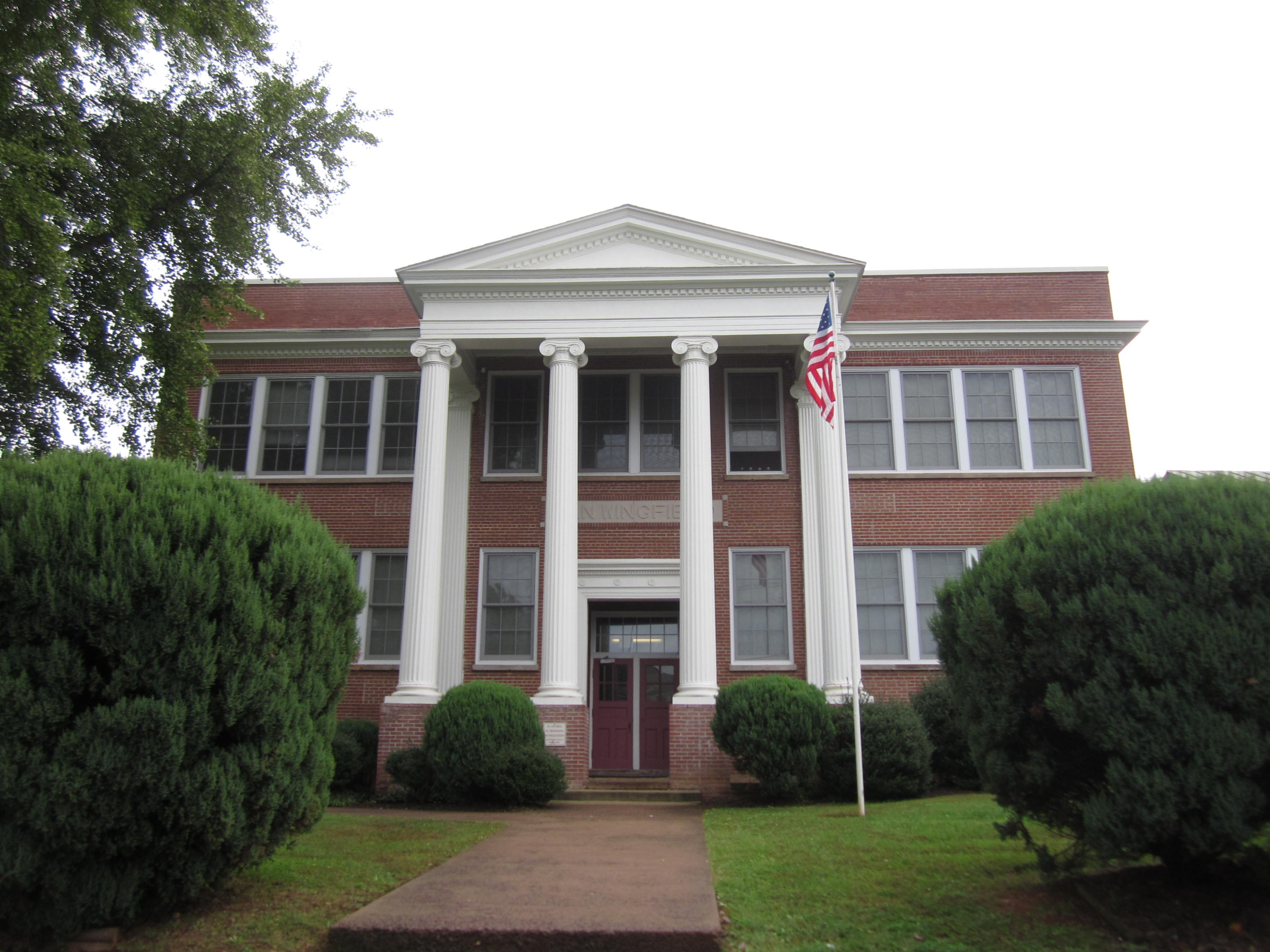
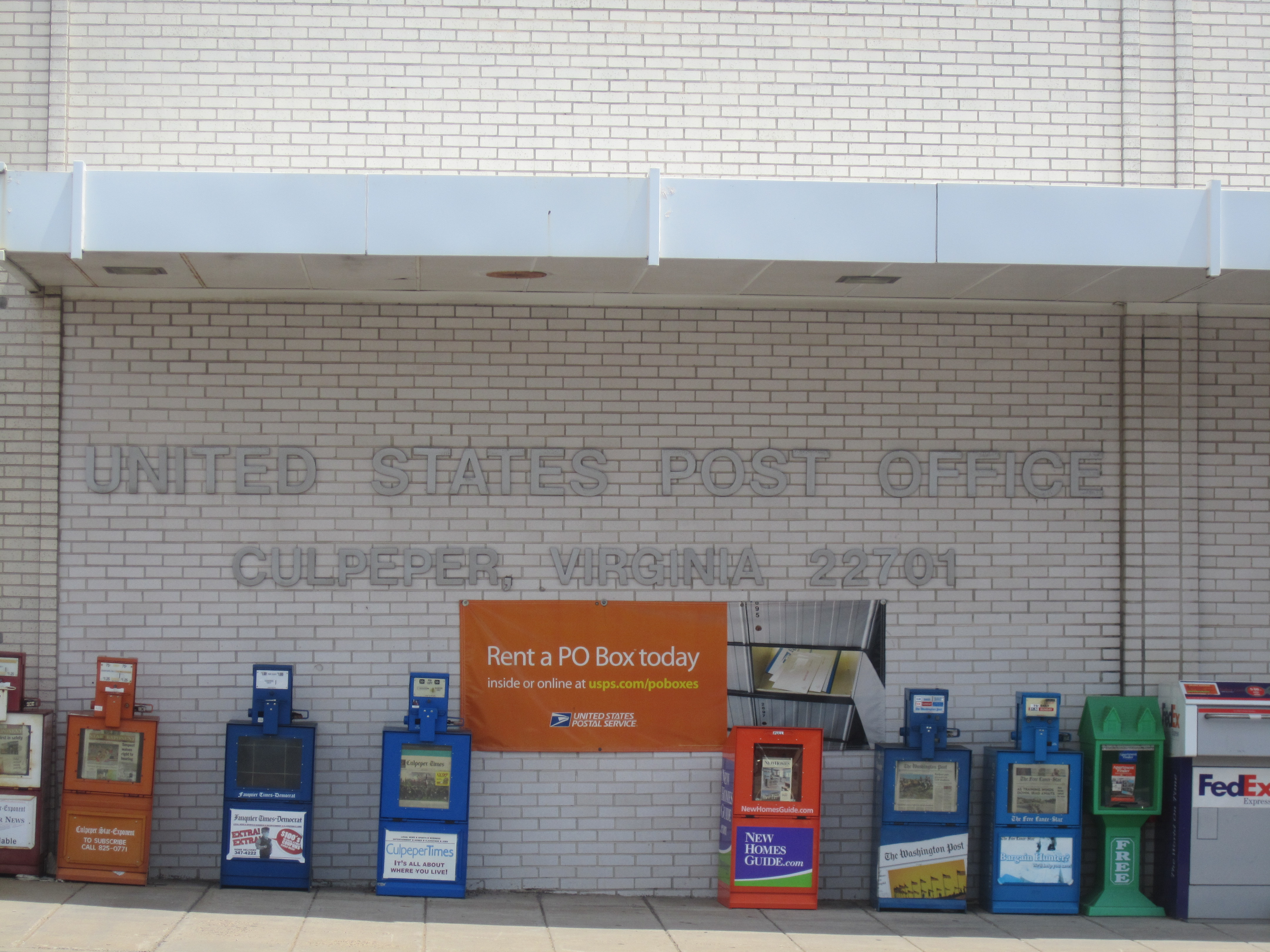
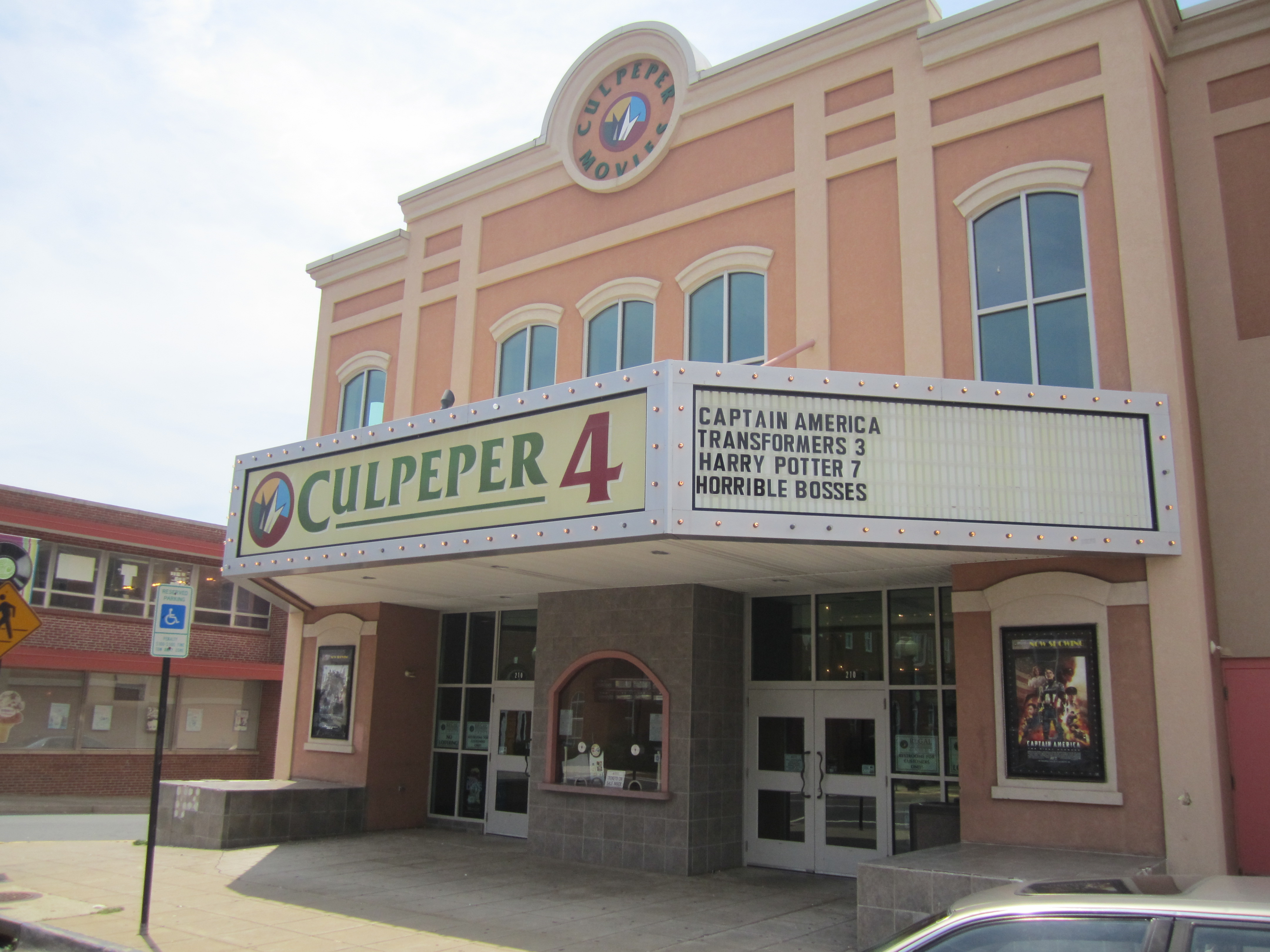
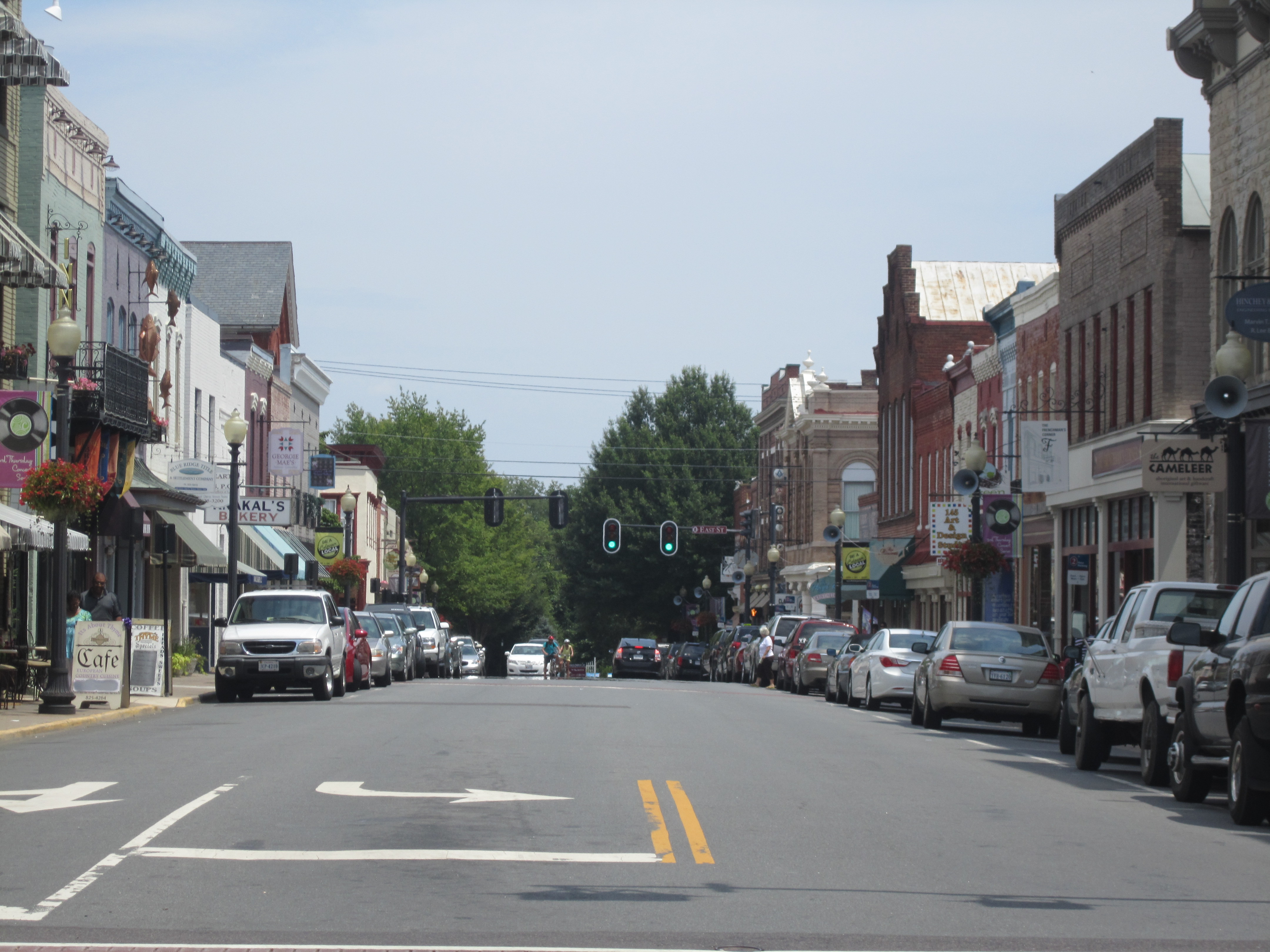
- Nickname: Downtown
- Interactive map of Downtown Culpeper
- Coordinates: 38°28′17″N 77°59′46″W
- Country: United States
- State: Virginia
- County: Culpeper County
- Time zone: UTC−5 (Eastern (EST))
  - Summer (DST): UTC−4 (EDT)
- ZIP code: 22701
- Area code: 540
- NRHP reference number: 89000183
- Website: culpeperdowntown.com

Downtown Culpeper is the historic central business district of Culpeper, Virginia, centered on East Davis and Main Streets. Known for its preserved 19th‑ and early 20th‑century architecture, most of it lies within the Culpeper Historic District, which was added to the National Register of Historic Places in 1987.

The district hosts shops, restaurants, galleries, and events such as the Third Thursday concert series and the Culpeper Farmers Market. In 2011, East Davis Street was recognized by the American Planning Association as one of "America's Great Places. In 2024, the travel outlet Family Destinations Guide described the area as “a visual feast of architectural styles spanning multiple eras.

== History ==
The downtown grid was originally surveyed in 1759 by a young George Washington. The arrival of the Orange and Alexandria Railroad in 1853 and the construction of a depot in 1904 helped solidify Culpeper as a regional transport hub.

By the 1980s, aging infrastructure and economic decline led to the creation of Culpeper Renaissance, Inc., a nonprofit focused on downtown revitalization.

On August 23, 2011, the 2011 Virginia earthquake caused damage to buildings downtown, including the historic train depot. Restoration work was led by CRI and town officials.

In 2023, local media such as the Culpeper Star-Exponent reported on efforts to install plaques and markers highlighting African-American history in the downtown area.

== Notable events ==
In June 2025, a political protest in Downtown Culpeper gained national attention when a vehicle drove through a dispersing crowd. Coverage from NBC4 Washington and Newsweek described the incident as taking place near East Davis Street.

=== 2026 Zandra's Taqueria fire ===
On May 30, 2026, a major fire destroyed the building housing Zandra's Taqueria at 302 East Davis Street in downtown Culpeper. Firefighters were dispatched shortly after 6:20 a.m. after reports of heavy smoke and a partial roof collapse. Crews from multiple Culpeper County and neighboring jurisdictions responded, and suppression efforts continued for approximately ten hours before the fire was brought under control.

The building was declared a total loss, resulting in the permanent closure of Zandra's Taqueria at the location. No people were injured in the fire, though the restaurant's pet dog died. Approximately 20 employees were displaced, and a community fundraising campaign was established to support staff following the loss of the business. The cause of the fire remained under investigation following the incident.

== Civic improvements ==
In 2014, the town installed energy-efficient LED street lighting across the downtown core.

== Architecture and landmarks ==
The area features Victorian, Italianate, and Federal architecture. Notable buildings include:

- The 1904 Culpeper train station
- Culpeper County Courthouse (1874)
- Restored churches and civic halls

Culpeper Renaissance, Inc. also oversees mural projects downtown, including a 2017 portrait of George Washington titled “The Surveyor.
