= Culpeper Times =

Newspaper in Virginia, U.S.

- Type: Weekly newspaper
- Format: Tabloid
- Owner(s): Rappahannock Media LLC
- Publisher: Tom Spargur
- Editor: Maria Basileo
- Founded: 1889
- Language: American English
- Headquarters: Culpeper, Virginia, United States
- City: Culpeper
- Country: United States
- Circulation: 5,000
- OCLC number: 68941573
- Website: www.insidenova.com/culpeper

Culpeper Times is a newspaper in Culpeper, Virginia, covering local news, sports, business and community. It was founded in 1889. The newspaper is a weekly, with a circulation of 5,000 copies It is owned by Rappahannock Media LLC, which purchased it in July 2014 from Virginia Media Group. Rappahannock Media LLC also owns InsideNoVa.com, a news web site serving all of Northern Virginia, as well as two other weekly newspapers: Rappahannock News and InsideNoVa/Prince William.
