= Germanna Community College =

Community college in Virginia, U.S.

- Established: 1970
- President: Janet Gullickson
- Students: 10,000 -plus credit students, 3,000 non-credit
- Location: Fredericksburg/ Culpeper/ Stafford/ Spotsylvania/ Orange/ Caroline/ Madison, Virginia, United States; 38°13′54.6″N 77°29′34.8″W
- Campus: multiple campuses
- Website: www.germanna.edu
- Location within Northern Virginia Location within Virginia Location within the United States

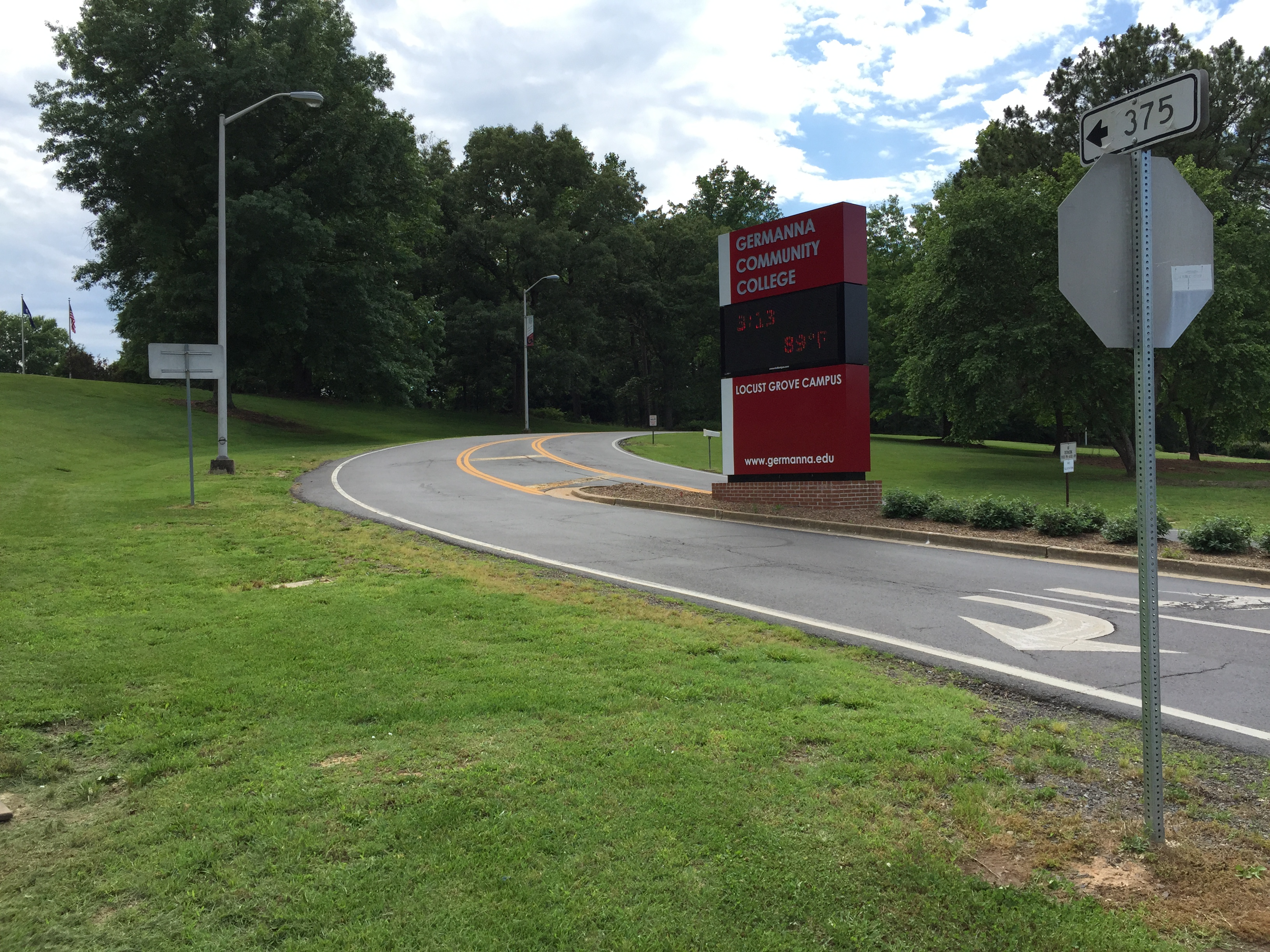
Locust Grove campus entrance

Germanna Community College (GCC) is a community college in Virginia with campuses in Locust Grove, Fredericksburg, Stafford and Culpeper. Founded in 1970, it takes its name from Germanna, a settlement founded by Governor Alexander Spotswood for a group of German miners by the Rapidan River at what is now Germanna Ford.

Germanna Community College is one of the twenty-three community colleges in Virginia that comprise the Virginia Community College System. The college serves the residents of Caroline, Culpeper, King George, Madison, Orange, Spotsylvania, and Stafford counties and the City of Fredericksburg.

== Accreditation ==
Germanna Community College is accredited by the Southern Association of Colleges and Schools, Commission on Colleges to award Associate's degrees. The college's Associate in Applied Science nursing program is accredited by the National League for Nursing Accrediting Commission and both the Associate in Applied Science nursing and practical nursing certificate programs are approved by the Virginia Board of Nursing.

== Location and facilities ==
=== Fredericksburg Area Campus in Spotsylvania ===

The Fredericksburg Area Campus in Spotsylvania is located on seventy acres in Spotsylvania County near the intersection of Interstate 95 at Routes 1 and 17 South donated by the John T. Hazel family. Phase I of the Fredericksburg Area Campus opened January, 1997. The V. Earl Dickinson Building, a 76,000 square-foot facility, includes classrooms, laboratories, library, student lounge, bookstore, and offices for faculty and administrative staff to provide a full range of services to students.

Phase II, The Workforce Development and Technology Center, a 40,000 square-foot building devoted to the use of technology for the delivery of instruction and advanced technology training programs, opened in October 2004.

Phase III, opened in 2012, is a 50,000 square-feet providing laboratories, instructional resources, student services and more. Parking decks opened at the same time. Tennis courts, playing fields, nature trails, jogging paths, and picnic areas are planned for future development of the 70-acre campus.

=== Locust Grove Campus ===
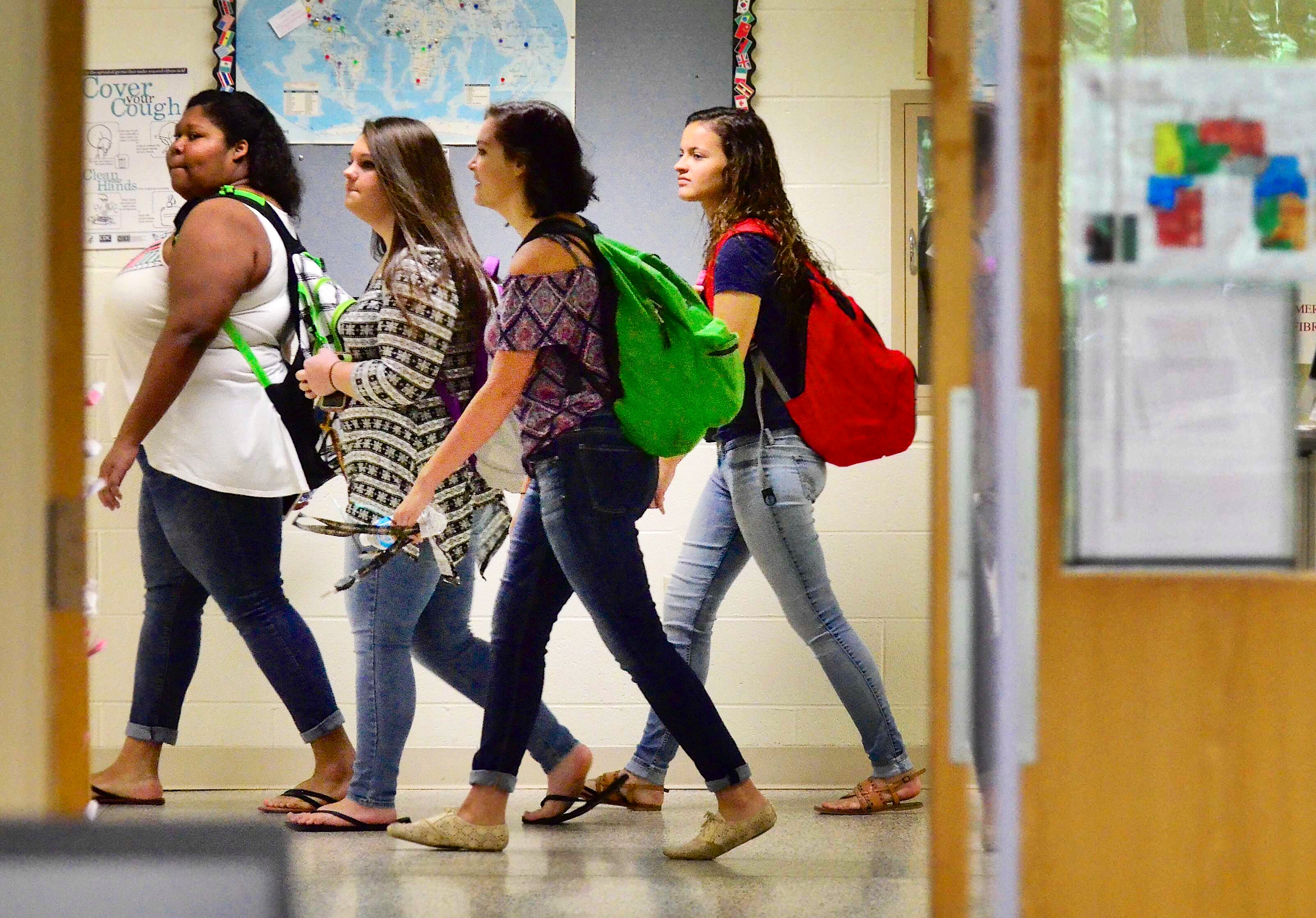
First day of class at the Locust Grove Campus in the Fall of 2016

The Locust Grove Campus is located on Route 3 midway between Culpeper and Fredericksburg. The campus consists of 100 wooded acres donated by the Germanna Foundation in 1969, adjacent to the Rapidan River in Orange County.

The campus building of approximately 60,000 square feet includes classrooms, laboratories (including a state-of-the-art technologies laboratory), a wellness center, bookstore, administrative and faculty offices, a library, information services, business office, and student lounge. Outdoor facilities include tennis courts and a playing field, as well as nature trails, jogging paths, and a picnic area. Germanna President David Sam announced the facility is working toward obtaining $2.5 million to replace the new building, and will demolish the old building. Sam anticipates the project will take six years to finish, and has announced he has yet to approach architects.

=== Daniel Technology Center (Culpeper) ===
Located at the junction of U.S. Route 29 and State Route 3 adjacent to the town of Culpeper, Germanna's Joseph R. Daniel Technology Center occupies 34 acres. The 39,000 square foot facility is designed primarily for workforce development instruction and technology training. A wide variety of credit classes are also offered. The Daniel Center includes a conference center with 700 theatre-style seats, a banquet with 300 seats, a manufacturing technology lab, an executive conference room, a training suite, and a catering kitchen. Its design also includes an interactive video theatre and a computer tech lab.

=== Barbara J. Fried Center (Stafford County) ===
Germanna's Barbara J. Fried Center in Stafford County is located at 124 Old Potomac Church Road. Germanna opened the facility in June 2018 with the support of Adam and Rhonda Fried and the Stafford County Economic Development Authority. The center provides a full range of credit courses for transfer to universities in addition to Workforce and Community Education. Stafford is also home to Germanna's Automotive Technology Center at 42 BlackJack Road.

=== Caroline Center (Ruther Glen) ===
Located at 11073 Colonel Armistead Drive in Ruther Glen, the Caroline Center provides Workforce Development training in that county.

=== FredCAT (Fredericksburg Center for Advanced Technology) ===
Located at 1325 Central Park Blvd. in Fredericksburg, FredCAT provides Workforce Development training in a variety of fields and is a base for apprenticeship training. It opened in June 2017 with support from the Fredericksburg Economic Development Authority.

== August 23, 2011 earthquake ==
On August 23, 2011, an earthquake damaged the Fredericksburg Area Campus' Dickinson Building. This was the only building with significant damage, while the damage to the other building was cosmetic.
