= USS Waccamaw =

Oiler of the United States Navy

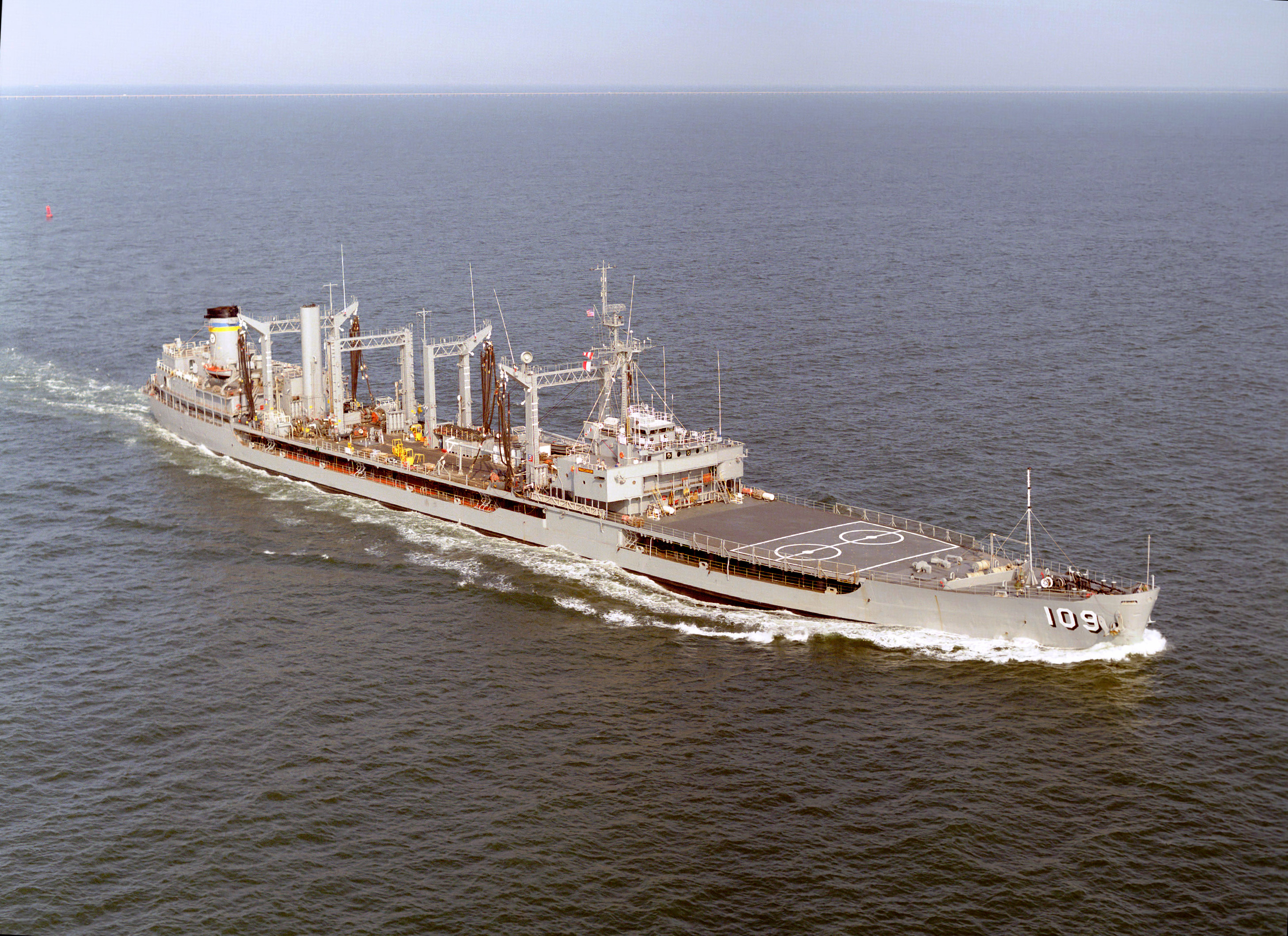
- USNS Waccamaw (T-AO-109) in 1984

History

United States
- Name: USS Waccamaw
- Namesake: The Waccamaw River in South Carolina
- Builder: Sun Shipbuilding & Drydock Co.
- Laid down: 28 April 1945
- Launched: 30 March 1946
- Commissioned: 25 June 1946
- Decommissioned: 24 February 1975
- In service: 1975
- Out of service: 1989
- Reclassified: T-AO-109 (1975)
- Stricken: 1991
- Identification: IMO number: 7737169
- Honors and awards: 1 battle star and Meritorious Unit Commendation (Vietnam); Meritorious Unit Commendation (Jordan)
- Fate: Transferred to the Military Sealift Command, 1975. Retired and assigned to the Maritime Administration Reserve Fleet, 1989. Sold for scrap and towed to Brownsville, TX, 11 October 2005.

General characteristics
- Class & type: Cimarron-class fleet replenishment oiler
- Type: T3-S2-A3 tanker hull
- Displacement: 23,235 long tons (23,608 t) full load
- Length: 553 ft (169 m)
- Beam: 75 ft (23 m)
- Draft: 32 ft 4 in (9.86 m)
- Speed: 18.3 knots (33.9 km/h; 21.1 mph)
- Capacity: 146,000 barrels (23,200 m^{3})
- Complement: 304
- Armament: 1 × single 5"/38 caliber guns; 4 × single 3"/50 caliber guns; 8 × 40 mm AA guns

USS Waccamaw (AO-109) was a Cimarron-class replenishment oiler in the United States Navy. She was named after Waccamaw River. The original capacity was 146,000 barrels (23,200 m^{3}).

Waccamaw was laid down on 28 April 1945 by the Sun Shipbuilding and Drydock Co., Chester, Pennsylvania; launched on 30 March 1946; sponsored by Miss Irene F. Long; and commissioned on 25 June 1946.

== Atlantic Fleet operations ==
After completing shakedown and training at Norfolk, Virginia, and Guantanamo Bay, Waccamaw spent her first two years engaged in transporting oil from the Persian Gulf to the United States. In September 1948, she was assigned to duty with the 6th Fleet in the Mediterranean and, in the spring of 1949, was transferred to the 2nd Fleet for exercises in the Caribbean. A second tour of the Mediterranean followed in the early part of 1950 and a third in 1951, the latter extending to nine months.

After a shipyard overhaul at Boston, Massachusetts, in 1952, Waccamaw participated in the development of the Thompson-Arwood method of fueling destroyers at sea in heavy weather. In 1953, the ship made her first midshipman cruise, which included a visit to Edinburgh, Scotland. During the summer of 1954, Waccamaw was again in the Mediterranean for her fourth tour with the 6th Fleet. This was followed by logistic services in the western Atlantic and Caribbean. On a second midshipman cruise in 1955, she visited Copenhagen, Denmark and Edinburgh, Scotland. In the fall of 1955, the ship entered the Philadelphia Naval Shipyard for overhaul and proceeded to the Caribbean for training the following spring. A third midshipman cruise was made in June and July 1956, the visit this time being to Halifax, Nova Scotia. At the end of July, the ship departed for a fifth assignment to the 6th Fleet. This tour was extended until January 1957 because of the Suez Crisis. During this period, Waccamaw provided logistic support to the ships engaged in the evacuation of Haifa, Israel; and Alexandria, Egypt.

After returning from the Mediterranean, Waccamaw operated in the Caribbean for two months, participated in the International Naval Review at Norfolk, Virginia, on 12 and 13 June 1957, and then departed on her fourth midshipman cruise which took her to Rio de Janeiro, Brazil; and Aruba, Dutch West Indies.

During September and October 1957, Waccamaw, as a member of the underway replenishment group, supported the international fleet participating in the NATO fall exercises. These exercises were designed to test the ability of the navies of the Atlantic community to cooperate in mutual defense. In the course of these operations, Waccamaw played a novel role in the rapidly developing character of the Fleet; she was the last oiler to fuel USS Wisconsin, the last of the battleships, and the first to fuel the new super carriers, USS Forrestal and USS Saratoga.

== Supporting U.S. landing in Lebanon ==
In the winter of 1957 and 1958, Waccamaw underwent an overhaul at Boston, followed by training at Guantanamo Bay. During the spring of 1958, she provided logistic support to antisubmarine groups in the western Atlantic. Refitted and retrained, Waccamaw joined the 6th Fleet for a Mediterranean deployment, during which she participated in the operations connected with Operation Blue Bat during the 1958 Lebanon crisis. Waccamaw returned to Newport, Rhode Island, her home port, in November 1958.

After a brief rest in December 1958, Captain Thomas H. Henry brought Waccamaw back to her assigned mission by fueling Destroyer Flotilla 2 in January 1959 and then proceeded south to the Virgin Islands where she remained until the end of March.

On 20 April 1959, Waccamaw departed for another Mediterranean tour. This seventh tour, however, was shorter than those previous, and she returned to Newport in June. Upon her return, the ship continued her familiar role of logistic support to the antisubmarine forces in the western Atlantic. This continued until November when she began a period of overhaul at the Bethlehem Steel Shipyard, New York. Due to a labor-management dispute in January 1960, Waccamaw was moved by tugs to the New York Shipyard at Brooklyn, New York, to complete her overhaul in April.

After completing refresher training at Guantanamo Bay, the ship returned to Newport, Rhode Island, and embarked 18 midshipmen from several eastern colleges for a cruise in Atlantic waters. After an eight-day tender availability at Newport, Waccamaw departed for an eighth tour with the 6th Fleet in the Mediterranean. During this deployment, Waccamaw was the first naval ship to visit the newly independent country of Cyprus. On 25 February 1961, she returned to Newport for a leave and upkeep period.

The spring months of 1961 were spent supporting the 2nd Fleet and conducting a sixth midshipman cruise. During August, Waccamaw underwent a much-needed tender availability, and a one-day dependents' cruise was fitted into her busy September schedule. In October, Waccamaw supported the newly created antisubmarine warfare group operating in the eastern Atlantic. She arrived back in the United States just in time for Christmas after an 11,800-mile (19,000 km) cruise. Waccamaw then commenced preparations for overhaul at the Bethlehem Steel Shipyard in Hoboken, New Jersey. Completing overhaul in April 1962, the ship sailed for refresher training at Guantanamo Bay.}

In June 1962, Waccamaw again resumed support of the 2nd Fleet; and, in August, she set sail for the Mediterranean on her ninth tour with the 6th Fleet. On the way, Waccamaw participated in Operation "Riptide", working in support of such ships as the nuclear carrier USS Enterprise. The ship spent the holiday season at Golfe Juan, France, and gave a Christmas party for some 50 orphans. She returned to her home port, Newport, on 2 March 1963.

== Search for USS Thresher ==
During the period from March through June, Waccamaw held a dependents' cruise; supported the fruitless USS Thresher search; and conducted two deployments which totaled five weeks with Canadian anti-submarine warfare forces. Late in July, Waccamaw departed Newport for six weeks in the Caribbean supporting Commander, ASW Forces, Atlantic Fleet, embarked in USS Randolph. Waccamaw fueled the carrier and her five escorting destroyers ten times. Upon her return, she stopped at Norfolk, Virginia, for a successful operational readiness inspection.

Waccamaw spent most of the fall in Newport, with scattered brief commitments and type training periods underway. Much time was devoted to the administrative inspection for fiscal 1964 which was held in November. At the year's end, preparations were hard underway on board Waccamaw for the most extensive yard period in the ship's 17-year history. She was scheduled to enter the Puget Sound Bridge and Dry-dock Co. in Seattle, Washington on 29 February 1964.

== West Coast operations ==
On 27 January 1964, Waccamaw got underway for Seattle, Washington, and arrived on 21 February. During a seven-month yard period, she received the oiler equivalent of "framming", "jumbo conversion." During this conversion the midsection of the ship (all the cargo tanks) was removed and a new midbody (100 feet longer than the original was inserted. All the steam winches were removed and replaced with "state-of-the-art" replenishment equipment including new cargo pumps.

On 26 February 1965, the ship returned to the Puget Sound Naval Shipyard, Bremerton, Washington. At that time, her status was changed from "in commission, in reserve" to "in commission, active." Following a fitting out and ready-for-sea period, Waccamaw departed the Puget Sound area and proceeded to San Diego, arriving there on 23 April. After stopping at Acapulco, Mexico, and Guantanamo Bay Naval Base, Cuba, the ship returned to Newport, Rhode Island, on 12 May 1965.

== Reassigned to homeport of Norfolk ==
During the period between 14 May and 17 June, Waccamaw engaged in shakedown training at Guantanamo Bay; then proceeded to Norfolk, Virginia, her new home port, for a period of upkeep and acceptance trials. On 13 July, she sailed for the Boston Naval Shipyard for post-shakedown availability which lasted from 19 July through 9 November. On 14 November, Waccamaw returned to Norfolk and underwent type training and services before serving as a replenishment ship for the primary recovery group assigned to the Gemini VI and VII space missions. She returned to Norfolk on 19 December and spent the remainder of 1965 in type training and services.

Waccamaw got underway on 10 January 1966 for the Caribbean and Operation "Springboard." During this exercise, she refueled 42 ships and conducted gunnery exercises and other at-sea trials before returning to Craney Island on 4 February. Upon her return, she operated in the Virginia Capes area and began making preparations for overseas deployment.

On 4 May 1966, Waccamaw departed Norfolk destined for the Mediterranean. She was the first "jumbo oiler" to operate with the 6th Fleet. During her Mediterranean cruise, she steamed in excess of 20,000 miles (32,000 km), refueled 256 ships, and pumped more than 32 million US gallons (120,000 m^{3}) of fuel oil. On 20 October, she returned to the Naval Station Norfolk, then proceeded to the Norfolk Naval Shipyard to repair the damage sustained in a minor collision with USS Noa.

The ship took part in Exercise "Lantflex 66" in the Caribbean on 28 November. Waccamaw returned to the Norfolk Navy Station on 15 December and remained until the end of the year for tender availability and holiday leave.

After refueling ships of the 2nd Fleet and lifting fuel at Craney Island, Waccamaw departed on 27 February 1967 to escort six destroyers to the Azores. She returned on 21 March, then got underway again on 10 April for Operation "Clovehitch III" which lasted through the end of the month. On 1 May, the ship returned to Norfolk for upkeep and tender availability.

On 12 June 1967, Waccamaw departed for a midshipman training cruise to the Caribbean and returned to Norfolk for upkeep. On 24 July, she took part in NATO Exercise "Lashout;" and, upon her return to Norfolk, she prepared for annual administrative and operational readiness inspections which were completed on 28 August and 12 September, respectively. From 6 to 27 October, the ship had tender availability at the Norfolk Navy Base.

== Searching for the lost submarine USS Scorpion ==
Waccamaw departed on 13 November for her 11th Mediterranean cruise. At the close of 1967, Waccamaw was at Naples, Italy, for a holiday liberty and upkeep period. This cruise ended on 23 April 1968 when the ship arrived at Norfolk, Virginia. On 28 May, she participated in the search for the nuclear submarine USS Scorpion. This was followed by exercises in the Jacksonville, Florida, and Virginia Capes operating areas and participation in NATO exercise "Silvertower" with the British and Canadian Navies. During "Silvertower", Waccamaw refueled 69 ships before returning to Norfolk on 15 October. The ship then operated off the Virginia and Florida coasts until 21 November when she underwent tender availability at Craney Island, Virginia, and returned to Norfolk on 18 December 1968 to finish the year in liberty and upkeep.

Waccamaw began the year 1969 in her home port of Norfolk, Virginia, and, on 2 January, arrived at the Maryland Shipbuilding and Drydock Co., Baltimore, for routine hull maintenance followed by regular overhaul at Home Bros. Shipyard, Newport News, Virginia. After conducting exercises in the Virginia Capes operating area, she completed refresher training in Guantanamo Bay on 20 June. The next month was spent in operations off the Virginia and Florida coasts. On 21 August, the ship moved to the Norfolk Naval Shipyard, Portsmouth, Virginia, to make final preparations for deployment.

== North Atlantic operations ==
On 2 September 1969, Waccamaw got underway for deployment to the North Atlantic. From 17 to 23 September, she participated in NATO Exercise "Operation Peacekeeper". Wacamaw returned to the Naval Station, Norfolk, on 11 December and remained there until the end of 1969 for leave and upkeep.

During January and February 1970, Waccamaw continued a period of tender availability. After a fuel lift at Craney Island, she departed on 5 March for a Mediterranean deployment. However, problems with her feed pumps forced Waccamaw to return to Norfolk. Repairs completed, she again set sail for the Mediterranean on 17 March and arrived at Rota, Spain, 12 days later. On 7 April, Waccamaw was visited by the Vice Chief of Naval Operations and the Commander, 6th Fleet. On 22 May, Admiral Zumwalt, Chief of Naval Operations, visited Waccamaw, high-lining on board from USS Julius A. Furer.

== Supporting Jordan Crisis operations ==
On 18 June 1970, USS Eugene A. Greene lost steering and collided with Waccamaw while refueling in the eastern Mediterranean. Neither ship was seriously damaged and continued their deployments.

The ship arrived at Rota, Spain, on 17 September. However, just four hours before outchop, she was notified that her deployment was to be extended due to the crisis in Jordan. Underway on the 18th, she returned to the Mediterranean. After visiting Athens, Greece, and Souda Bay, Crete, Waccamaw again departed for Rota, Spain, and home. Waccamaw arrived at Norfolk, Virginia, on 31 October and spent the remainder of 1970 in leave and upkeep.

== Collision with USS Detroit ==
In 1971 Waccamaw was in restricted availability status in Norfolk, Virginia. After sea trials on 10 February and a fuel lift at Craney Island on 16 February, Waccamaw got underway for operations on 20 February. Three days later, she collided with USS Detroit during an underway replenishment but sustained very little damage. However, she returned to Norfolk for repairs which lasted from 24 February to 9 March.

During the next month, Waccamaw operated in the Jacksonville, Florida, operations area. Upon her return to Norfolk, the ship remained in port for repairs until 28 June.

On 28 June 1971, Waccamaw deployed to the North Atlantic to support the anti-submarine warfare group. Steering difficulties forced her to return home early on 29 August. Waccamaw spent the remainder of the year in port undergoing steering repairs and upkeep, except for sea trials on 20 September and services in the Virginia capes area from 2 to 24 November 1971.

Waccamaw departed on 3 January 1972 for refresher training at Guantanamo Bay. She returned to Norfolk on 12 February, after having visited Port-au-Prince, Haiti, and Port Everglades, Florida. The ship spent the next month in port providing services for a naval reserve surface division. From 17 March through 30 May, Waccamaw conducted operations in the Virginia Capes area and off the east coast of Florida and South Carolina.

== Circumnavigating the world by sea ==
On 30 May 1972, Waccamaw set sail from Moscow, Virginia, for a nine-month deployment to Subic Bay, Philippines. On 21 June, the ship rounded the Cape of Good Hope and entered the Indian Ocean. Arriving on 11 July, she anchored in Subic Bay after a 41-dav transit. Five days later, she got underway for her first "line swing" off the coast of Vietnam. This duty consumed the rest of the year, with the exception of periodic rests and repairs at Hong Kong and Singapore.

Waccamaw found herself working again early in the new year. On 4 January 1973, a milestone was reached: Waccamaw refueled USS Lang, her last of 246 commitments off the coast of Vietnam. The ship returned to Subic Bay, thence to Pearl Harbor, the Panama Canal, and, finally, Norfolk, Virginia. She arrived at her home port on 17 February 1973, after circumnavigating the world.

== Return to East Coast assignments ==
On 9 April, Waccamaw got underway to provide services NATO forces operating off the coast of Greenland. Upon her return to Norfolk, the ship underwent restricted availability from 4 May until 16 July. After extensive repairs, Waccamaw got underway on 8 December 1973 to operate off the coast of Virginia. She returned to Norfolk one week later and spent the last weeks of 1973 in her home port area.

On 8 January 1974, Waccamaw got underway for Mayport, Florida, and operated in the Jacksonville area. On 27 January, she arrived at Roosevelt Roads, Puerto Rico, and took part in Operation "Springboard-74", followed by a stop at Guantanamo Bay, arriving on 18 February. Waccamaw departed on 1 March for Norfolk, Virginia, where she remained through April. On 3 May, the ship got underway for a Mediterranean cruise. This seven-month deployment took the ship to ports in Spain, Italy, France, Greece, Crete and Turkey.

== Decommissioning, civilian service and disposal ==
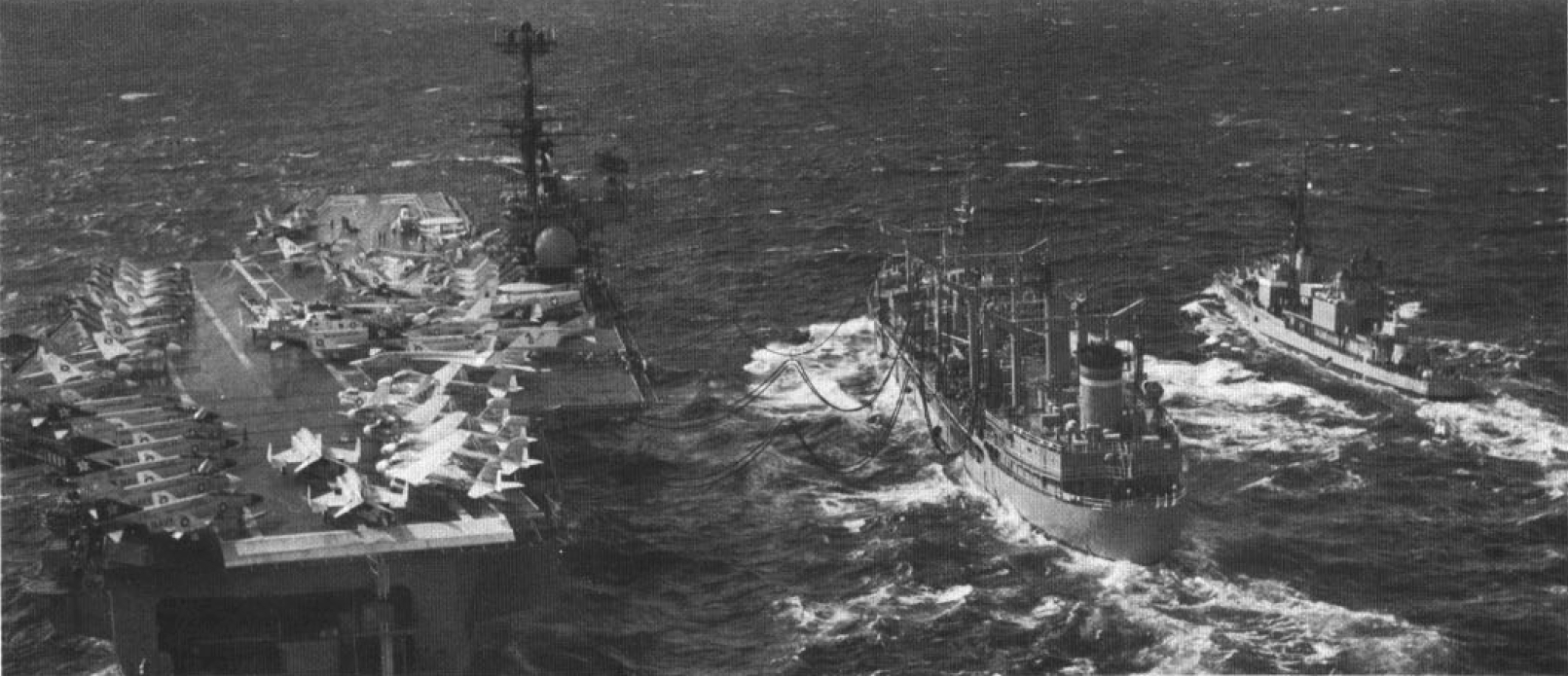
Waccamaw refueling USS Independence and USS Richard E. Kraus, 1976

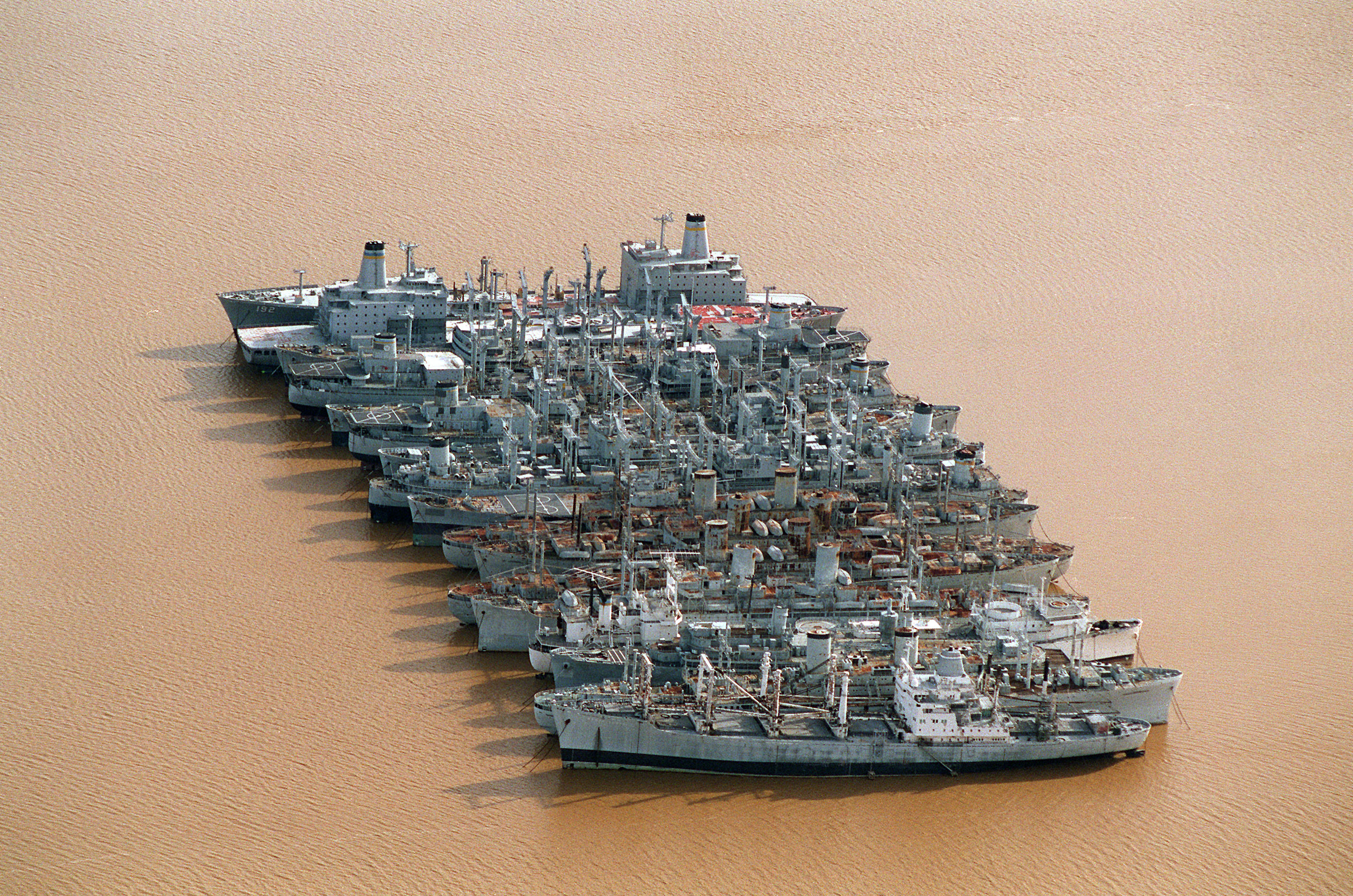
Waccamaw (ninth ship from the top) laid up with a "nest" of other oilers in Unit 7 of the Reserve Fleet moored near Fort Eustis, 28 January 1996.

On 6 December 1974, Waccamaw returned to Norfolk, Virginia, where she prepared for decommissioning. The ship was decommissioned by the Navy on 24 February 1975. Waccamaw transferred to the Military Sealift Command, where she continued in non-commissioned U.S. Navy service with a civilian crew as United States Naval Ship USNS Waccamaw (T-AO-108).

On 3 April 1978, USS Fort Snelling and Waccamaw received structural damage in a collision north of Corsica when Waccamaw lost steering control during refueling. Both proceeded under their own power to Naples, Italy, for repairs.

On 21 November 1978, Waccamaw collided with USS Saratoga which was operating with the 6th Fleet, during a refueling operation 50 miles (80 km) south of Crete, suffering minor damage and no injuries.

On 24 September 1981 USS Guadalcanal and Waccamaw collided during underway replenishment south of Sardinia, Italy, causing minor damage but no injuries.

Waccamaw was retired from service and returned to the Navy in 1989. She was then transferred to the custody of MARAD and assigned to the National Defense Reserve Fleet at Fort Eustis, James River, Reserve Fleet, where she remained berthed until sold for scrapping at Brownsville, Texas in 2005.

== Awards ==
Waccamaw received one award of the Meritorious Unit Commendation for participation in the Jordanian crisis of 1970, and a Meritorious Unit Commendation and one battle star for service in Vietnam.
