= Spanish ship Almirante Valdés =

Various Spanish Navy ships

Two ships of the Spanish Navy have borne the name Almirante Valdés, after Captain General of the Navy Gutierre de Hevia y Valdés (1704–1772):

- Almirante Valdés, a Churruca-class destroyer in commission from 1933 to 1957.
- Almirante Valdés (D-32), a Lepanto-class destroyer in commission from 1959 to 1986 that previously served in the United States Navy as USS Converse (DD-509).
