= USS Noa (DD-343) =

US Navy Clemson-class destroyer in service 1921–1944

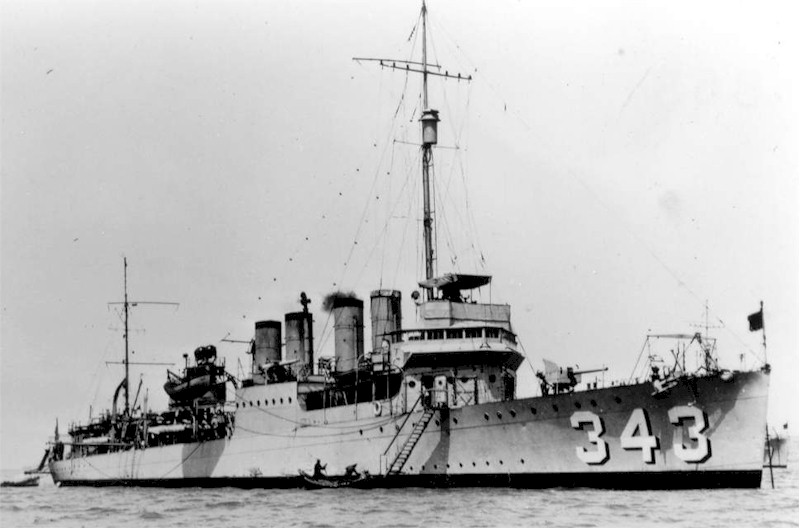
- USS Noa (DD-343)

History

United States
- Namesake: Loveman Noa
- Ordered: 6 October 1917
- Builder: Norfolk Naval Shipyard, Portsmouth, Virginia
- Laid down: 18 November 1918
- Launched: 28 June 1919
- Commissioned: 15 February 1921
- Decommissioned: 11 November 1934
- Recommissioned: 1 April 1940
- Fate: Sank following collision 12 September 1944

General characteristics
- Class & type: Clemson-class destroyer
- Displacement: 1,190 tons
- Length: 314 feet 6 inches (95.86 m)
- Beam: 30 feet 8 inches (9.35 m)
- Draft: 9 feet 3 inches (2.82 m)
- Propulsion: 26,500 shp (20 MW); geared turbines, 2 screws
- Speed: 35 knots (65 km/h)
- Range: 4,900 nmi (9,100 km); @ 15 kt
- Complement: 150 officers and enlisted
- Armament: 4 × 4 in (100 mm) guns, 1 × 3 in (76 mm) gun, 4 × 3 21 inch (533 mm) torpedo tubes

The first USS Noa (DD-343/APD-24) was a Clemson-class destroyer in the United States Navy following World War I. She was named for Midshipman Loveman Noa. At the beginning of World War II she was converted to a High-speed transport and redesignated APD-24.

== History ==
Noa was built by the Norfolk Navy Yard, Portsmouth, Virginia. Authorized 6 October 1917, she was laid down 18 November 1918. She was launched on 28 June 1919, sponsored by Mrs. Albert Morehead, sister of Midshipman Loveman Noa; and commissioned 15 February 1921.

Following shakedown out of Virginia, Noa operated out of Charleston, South Carolina. Through May 1922, she participated in Atlantic Coast training maneuvers. In late May, she sailed for duty on the Asiatic Station, steaming via the Mediterranean and Aden and Ceylon. She reached Singapore 14 August and on 30 September, she arrived at her new home yard at Cavite, Philippine Islands. Through the summer of 1922, Noa remained active on the Asiatic station. She patrolled Chinese and Philippine waters and attempted to protect American interests during the Chinese Civil War, which was renewed in November 1922.

On 27 February 1927, the Noa arrived at Nanjing, China, relieving USS Simpson as the ship stationed there "to protect American lives and property." On 24 March 1927, with her sister ship, USS William B. Preston, and Royal Navy light cruiser HMS Emerald, she helped to rescue foreigners from Nanjing. The three ships used their main batteries to lay down a barrage of shrapnel and high explosive on Socony Hill, driving back hostile Chinese forces and also halting sniping along the Nanjing Bund and a sortie by Kuomintang gunboats. This allowed refugees to retreat down the hill to the safety of U.S. and British warships. Noa also participated in the periodic fleet exercises which were intended to keep crew and equipment at peak efficiency.

Upon return to the United States on 14 August 1929, Noa went into the Mare Island Navy Yard for overhaul before assignment to West Coast operations. Through the next five years, she operated out of San Diego as a unit of the Battle Fleet. During the fall and winter of 1929, Noa was called upon to assist in plane guard duties with carriers Langley (CV-1) and Saratoga (CV-3), off the California coast. She thus participated in the early development of U.S. carrier-group tactics. She also took part in the fleet exercises from 1930 to 1934. Noa served as cruise ship for Naval Reserve Officer Training Corps students from the University of California, Berkeley from 17 June to 8 July 1934. She then steamed for Philadelphia on 14 August 1934, decommissioned there on 11 November 1934, and was placed in reserve.

== World War II ==
Noa recommissioned at Philadelphia on 1 April 1940 and was fitted with a seaplane which nested just forward of the after deckhouse, replacing the after torpedo tubes. At the same time, a boom for lifting the aircraft was stepped in place of the mainmast. She steamed for the Delaware Capes in May and conducted tests with an XSOC-1 seaplane piloted by Lt. G. L. Heap. The plane was hoisted onto the ocean for takeoff and then recovered by Noa while the ship was underway. Lt. Heap also made an emergency flight 15 May to transfer a sick man to the Naval Hospital at Philadelphia.

Such dramatic demonstrations convinced the Secretary of the Navy that destroyer-based scout planes had value, and on 27 May, he directed that six new destroyers of the soon-to-be-constructed Fletcher-class (DD 476–481) be fitted with catapults and handling equipment. Because of mechanical deficiencies in the hoisting gear, the program was cancelled early in 1943. The concept thus failed to mature as a combat technique, but the destroyer-observation seaplane team was to be revived under somewhat modified conditions during later amphibious operations.

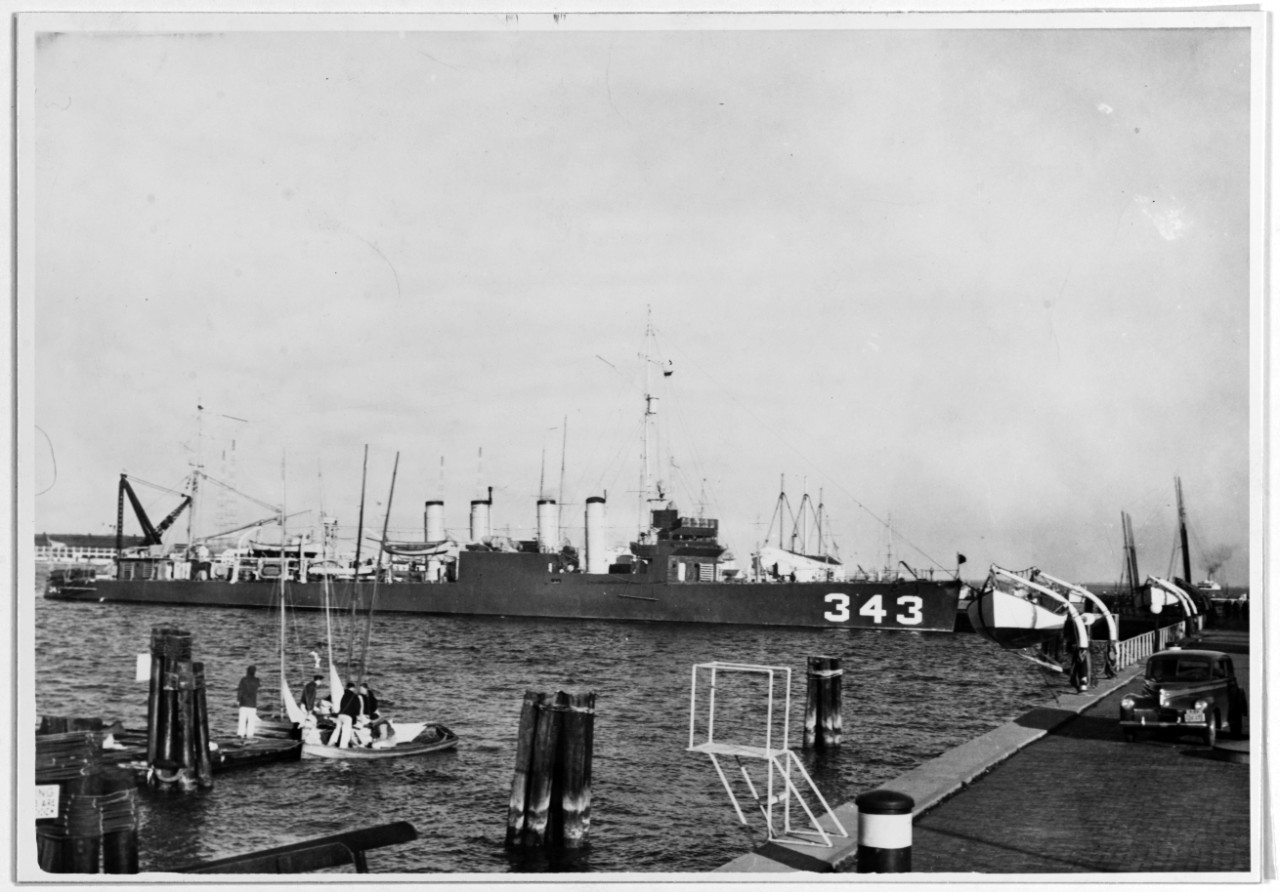
USS Noa (DD-343) at the United States Naval Academy on 1 May 1941.

Noa spent much of the next two years on experimental assignments and on midshipman training operations out of Annapolis, Maryland. She underwent availability at Boston Navy Yard the first week of December 1941 and then participated in Chesapeake Bay exercises through 27 December. Next, she steamed for Key West, Florida and participated in the shakedown of major fleet units in the Gulf of Mexico. After acting as a plane and screen guard for the carrier Hornet, she steamed for Hampton Roads. En route, a large wave carried away part of her bridge and she put in at Charleston, S.C. for emergency repairs.

She then steamed for Boston via Bermuda. Upon completion of repairs at Boston Navy Yard, she was directed to conduct Atlantic coast antisubmarine warfare (ASW) patrols, commencing 25 March 1943. At 09.03 hours on 3 April 1943, the unescorted Gulfstate (Master James Frank Harrell, lost) was hit by two torpedoes from U-155 about 50 miles southeast of Marathon Key, Florida, while steaming a nonevasive course at 10.5 knots. Eight officers, 26 crewmen and nine armed guards were lost. Three of the wounded were later transferred to Noa for medical treatment. She also participated in the training program for the Navy's Sound School at Key West. Until 28 July, she operated out of Key West, assigned training, patrol, rescue, and convoy escort duties.

Noa reported to the Sixth Amphibious Forces 31 July. During August and September, she was converted, at Norfolk Navy Yard, to a high speed transport and was reclassified APD-24 on 10 August 1943. Work was completed 17 September and after shakedown in the Chesapeake river, she departed Norfolk 18 October and escorted Sumter (APA-52) to San Diego via the Panama Canal, arriving 2 November.

Noa steamed for Pearl Harbor 4 November, arriving 10 November for a week of yard availability. Underway 19 November, she escorted SS J. H. Kincaid to Espiritu Santo, New Hebrides, via Samoa, arriving 4 December. She departed 5 December and steamed to Buna, New Guinea, where she assumed duty as landing craft control ship 11 December. In this capacity, she steamed between Buna, and Cape Cretin, New Guinea. She was detached from this duty and anchored off Cape Sudest 21 December.

She steamed for Cape Gloucester, New Britain, 25 December and arrived just before dawn the next day. After a preliminary bombardment by naval and army air units, Noa landed 144 officers and men of the First Marine Division. She returned to Cape Sudest via Buna 27 December to take on 203 more First Division Marines, who reinforced the forces at Cape Gloucester 29 December. Her operations in the Cape Gloucester landings extended through 1 March 1944. Noa's participation in the Bismarck Archipelago operation also took her through the Green Island landings (15–19 February).

In the Purvis Bay area of the Solomon Islands, she performed patrol and escort operations 21 February – 7 March. She next steamed to Tassafaronga Point, Guadalcanal, and took on Fourth Marine Division troops for the Emirau Island assault of 23 March. By 8 April, she was back at Cape Cretin, New Guinea, where she took on troops for the Hollandia amphibious operations that extended from late April through 1 May.

Noa steamed for Pearl Harbor 11 May, arrived 23 May, and embarked units of the Second Marine Division for transport to Saipan. She patrolled assigned areas off Saipan 15 June and that day shot down a raiding aircraft. The next day, she landed her troops and continued patrol operations until 24 June, when she steamed to Eniwetok Atoll. Noa departed Eniwetok 30 June and escorted Clamp (ARS-33) to Saipan, arriving 4 July. She conducted patrol and screening operations off Tinian and Saipan through the next week. During the Guam operations of 12 July – 15 August, Noa served as a screening ship. By 16 August, she had returned to Guadalcanal and the next day, she commenced patrol operations out of Purvis Bay.

Departing Purvis Bay 6 September, she steamed for the Palau Islands to conduct underwater demolition activities. While en route, she was rammed by Fullam (DD-474) at 0350, 12 September 1944. She immediately began to settle. Rescue efforts were performed by the crew of Fullam in an attempt to save the sinking Noa; numerous members of the team received battlefield commissions, including Seaman Joseph DeSisto. The order to abandon ship was given at 0501, but by 0700, Noa's commanding officer, Lieutenant Commander H. Wallace Boud, USNR had returned to her with a salvage party, including Lt. George A. Williams, Engineering Officer of the Noa who also testified at the court martial of the Fullam's commander. Salvage efforts failed, however, and the second order to abandon ship was given at 1030; the old ship sank by the stern at 1034 with no loss of life. The commanding officer of Fullam was court-martialed in November 1944 in San Francisco, California.

== Awards ==
- Yangtze Service Medal
- American Defense Service Medal
- American Campaign Medal
- Asiatic-Pacific Campaign Medal with five battle stars
- World War II Victory Medal
