= USS O'Hare =

U.S. Navy Gearing-class destroyer of 1945–1973

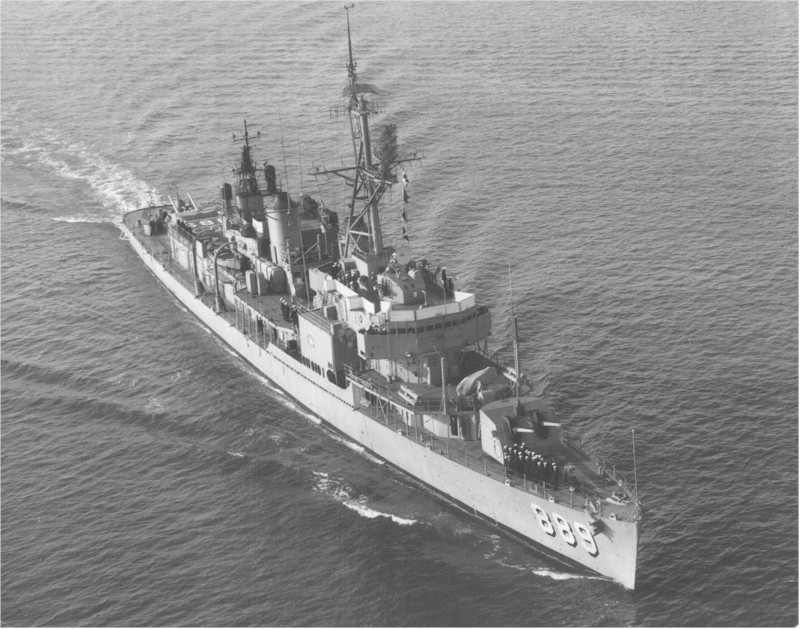
- USS O'Hare underway in 1966.

History

United States
- Name: O'Hare
- Namesake: Edward O'Hare
- Builder: Consolidated Steel Corporation
- Laid down: 27 January 1945
- Launched: 22 June 1945
- Commissioned: 29 November 1945
- Decommissioned: 31 October 1973
- Reclassified: DDR-889, 1953
- Stricken: 2 June 1975
- Identification: Callsign: NBIM; Hull number: DD-889
- Motto: Custodia Pacis; (Hold Peace)
- Fate: Loaned to Spain 31 October 1973; Sold to Spain 17 May 1978
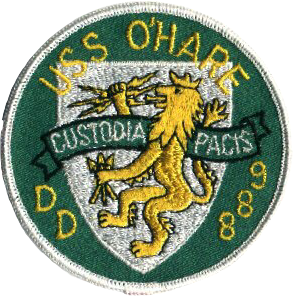
- Badge

Spain
- Name: Méndez Núñez
- Namesake: Casto Méndez Núñez
- Acquired: 31 October 1973
- Decommissioned: 3 April 1992
- Stricken: 1992
- Identification: Hull number: D-63
- Fate: Scrapped 1992

General characteristics
- Class & type: Gearing-class destroyer; Churruca-class destroyer
- Displacement: 2,425 long tons (2,464 t)
- Length: 390 ft 6 in (119.02 m)
- Beam: 41 ft (12 m)
- Draft: 18 ft 6 in (5.64 m)
- Propulsion: General Electric geared turbines, 2 shafts, 60,000 shp (45 MW)
- Speed: 32 knots (59 km/h; 37 mph)
- Range: 4,500 nmi (8,300 km) at 20 kn (37 km/h; 23 mph)
- Complement: 267
- Armament: 6 × 5"/38 caliber guns (3×2); 12 × 40 mm AA guns (2×4, 2×2); 11 × 20 mm AA guns (11×1); 10 × 21 inch (533 mm) torpedo tubes (2×5); 6 × depth charge projectors; 2 × depth charge tracks

USS O'Hare (DD/DDR-889) was a Gearing-class destroyer of the United States Navy in commission from 1945 to 1973. She was named for Lieutenant Commander Edward "Butch" O'Hare, Medal of Honor recipient, who was shot down during the Battle of Tarawa on 27 November 1943.

After the conclusion of her U.S. Navy service, O'Hare was transferred to Spain, where she served in the Spanish Navy from 1973 to 1992 as Méndez Núñez (D63).

== Construction and commissioning ==
O'Hare was laid down at the Consolidated Steel Corporation at Orange, Texas, on 27 January 1945. She was launched on 22 June 1945, sponsored by Mrs. Selma O'Hare, the mother of Lieutenant Commander Edward "Butch" O'Hare, and commissioned on 29 November 1945.

== Service history ==
=== 1946–1963 ===
In February 1946, following shakedown, O'Hare became an active unit of the U.S. Navy. After spending 1946 in operations ranging from New Brunswick down to the Florida Keys, she embarked her first group of midshipmen for a cruise to Latin America during the summer of 1947. Departing Norfolk, Virginia, early in May 1948 she sailed to the Mediterranean temporarily serving under the United Nations' flag as an evacuation ship off Haifa, Israel, from 24 June through July, during the 1948 Arab–Israeli War. Several goodwill visits took place before departure for home in September at the conclusion of this first deployment with the Sixth Fleet.

Eight additional such tours of duty, prior to the end of 1962, permitted ship's company to gain a great deal of familiarity with the area. Midshipman cruises and NATO maneuvers added new vistas and dimensions to her training exercises as did several rescue operations. Twice in 1952 this destroyer received commendations for her efforts after ships had collided at sea, while in 1957 and again in 1961 aviators from the carriers Randolph and Franklin D. Roosevelt respectively were plucked from the sea. Meanwhile, to update and increase her value to the Navy, O'Hare was converted during 1953 to a radar picket ship (DDR-889) and in 1958 received installation of the electronic data system. The next major modification, in 1963, a FRAM Mk I overhaul, restored her original designation.

=== 1963–1973 ===
The increasing tempo and scope of the Vietnam War brought O'Hare an assignment to WestPac duty. Steaming from Norfolk, on 1 June 1966, she assumed station as a gun support ship along the coast of Vietnam on 15 July, firing missions in all four Corps areas in the South. O'Hare served as plane guard for aircraft carriers on "Yankee Station" in the Gulf of Tonkin, participated in "Sea Dragon" operations, patrolled on search and rescue duties off North Vietnam. O'Hare returned home on 17 December via the Suez Canal, completing a circumnavigation of the world. In March 1968, along with USS Charles R. Ware from Mayport, O'Hare deployed to the Indian Ocean via Africa and made 17 port calls in the Middle East. In January 1969 with Destroyer Squadron 32 (DesRon 32) she again deployed to the Mediterranean.

O'Hare deployed to Vietnam on 1 December 1972, remaining on gunfire support duty there until the cease fire of March 1973. She then became the last U.S. Navy ship based on the United States East Coast to circumnavigate the world after a Vietnam deployment during her return to the United States. She became a "blue-nosed" ship during the voyage when she crossed the Arctic Circle on 17 September 1972, and passed through the Panama Canal on 6 December 1972.

O'Hare was decommissioned on 31 October 1973, and transferred on loan to the Spanish Navy. The ship was struck from the Naval Vessel Register on 2 June 1975.

== Méndez Núñez (D-63) ==
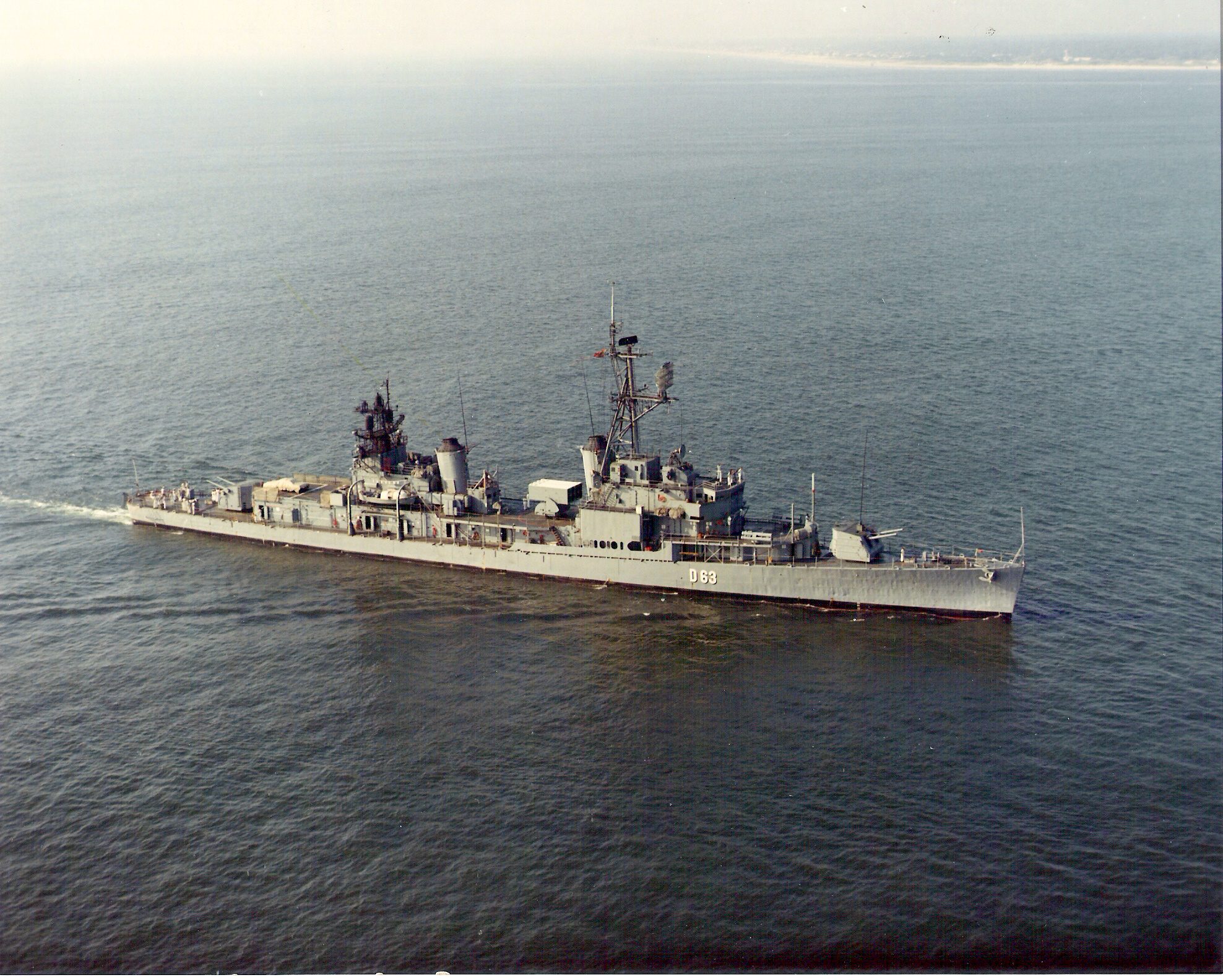
Méndez Núñez (D63) underway in the Chesapeake Bay in 1973.

O'Hare was sold outright to Spain on 17 May 1978. In the Spanish Navy, she served as Méndez Núñez (D-63), in honor of Vice Admiral Casto Méndez Núñez (1824–1869), and was the third ship in Spanish navy with this name.

Méndez Núñez was stricken and scrapped in 1992.
