= Churruca-class destroyer (1972) =

Class of Spanish destroyers

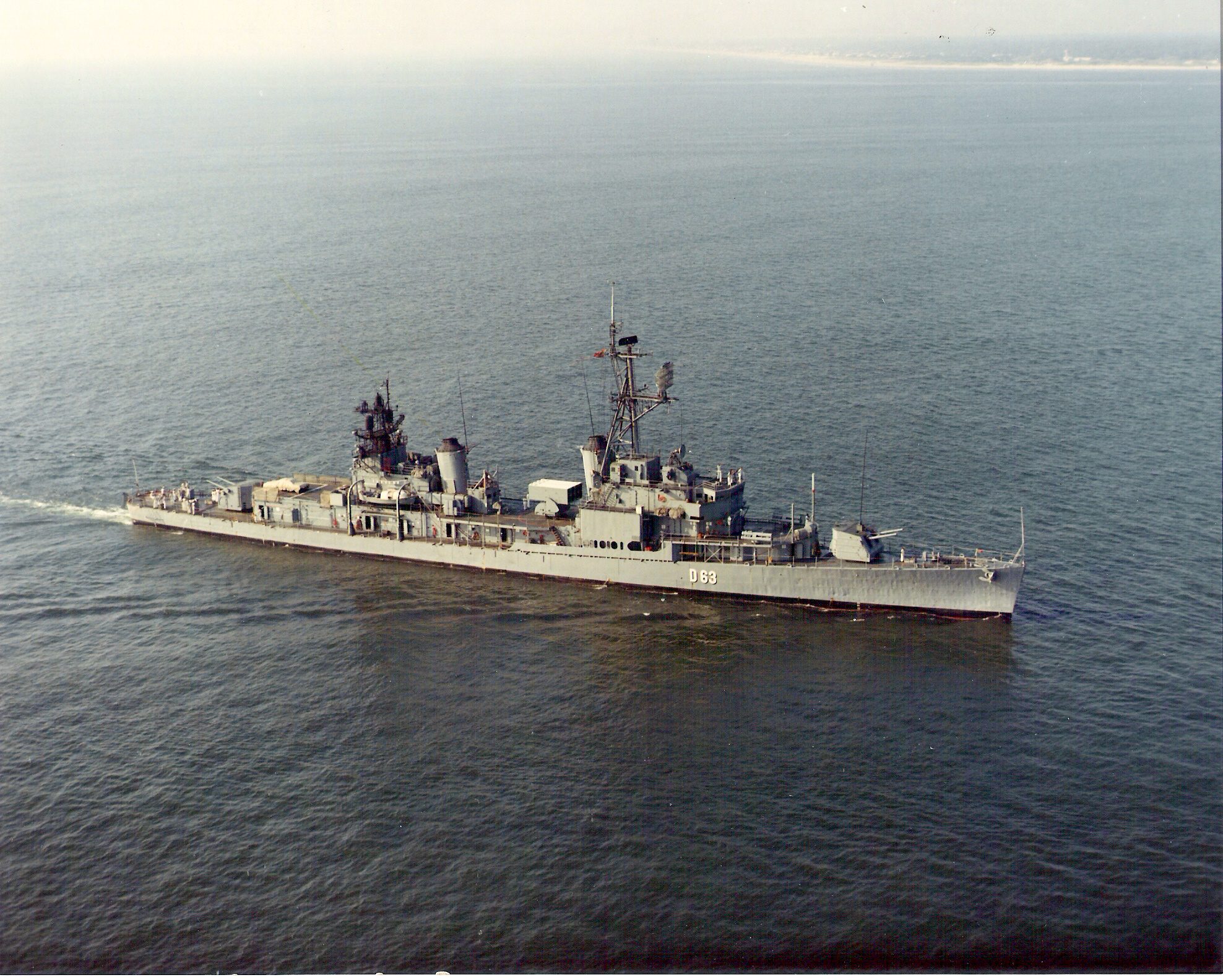
- Méndez Núñez in 1973

Class overview
- Name: Churruca class
- Builders: Bath Iron Works; Consolidated Steel; Federal Shipbuilding
- Operators: Spanish Navy
- Preceded by: Oquendo class
- Succeeded by: N/A
- Built: 1944–1945
- In commission: 1972–1992
- Completed: 5
- Retired: 5

General characteristics
- Type: Destroyer
- Displacement: 2,616 long tons (2,658 t) standard; 3,460 long tons (3,520 t) full load
- Length: 390.5 ft (119.0 m)
- Beam: 40.9 ft (12.5 m)
- Draft: 14.3 ft (4.4 m)
- Installed power: 4 × boilers; 60,000 shp (45,000 kW)
- Propulsion: General Electric steam turbines; 2 × shafts
- Speed: 36.8 knots (68.2 km/h; 42.3 mph)
- Range: 4,500 nmi (8,300 km; 5,200 mi) at 20 kn (37 km/h; 23 mph)
- Complement: 350 as designed
- Armament: 4 × 5 in/38 cal guns (in 2 × 2 Mk 38 DP mounts); 1 × ASROC 8-cell launcher; 2 × triple Mark 32 torpedo tubes for Mark 44 torpedoes; 1 × Drone Anti-Submarine Helicopter (DASH); Variable Depth Sonar (VDS)
- Aviation facilities: Hangar and helipad

The Churruca class was a series of five Spanish Navy ships which originated from the US Navy Gearing-class destroyers. They were all acquired in the 1970s in FRAM I configuration.

== Development ==
These were ships built during the Second World War and modernized from 1959 within the FRAM I program, which were in service with the United States Navy until their delivery to Spain. Ships similar to these were delivered by the United States Navy to most of its allies during the same time, and some of them were in service until the early 21st century. Although they were old ships, the fact is that they were mounted with quite modern sensors (seen from the point of view of the 60s), but they became obsolete throughout the 1970s and, especially, the 1980s. These ships were similar in their equipment to the modernized Oquendo class, were an important reinforcement for the Spanish Navy in the 1970s, actively participating in national and international maneuvers. In the Spanish Armada they came to be known jokingly as "the blind men of the eleven", in reference to the lack of acuity of their sensors at the end of their useful life and to their belonging to the 11th Escort Squadron (in Spain, the acronym ONCE correspond to the National Organization of the Spanish Blind).

Blas de Lezo, when it served as USS Noa in the United States Navy, was the ship in charge of recovery from the sea in 1962 of John Glenn, the first American astronaut to orbit the Earth. The vessel also participated in the Spanish evacuation of the Spanish Sahara in 1975, after the green march during the Western Sahara War. Blas de Lezo was part of the fleet in control of the strait during the Desert Storm operation in 1991, at which time, due to the shortage of escorts in the Navy, some of these ships operated alongside the Alpha Group, carrying out maritime control tasks in the Eastern Mediterranean.

Entering the 1990s, the Oquendo-class destroyers were progressively decommissioned, until the disappearance of the 11th Escort Squadron in which was dissolved on 2 September 1991. With the disappearance of these ships, the history of destroyers in the Spanish Navy was closed, at least for the moment, being the country that began to use them, although it is true that the dividing line between frigates and destroyers, today were faint.

== Ships in class ==
Churruca class
Hull no.	Name	Builder	Laid down	Launched	Commissioned	Decommissioned
D-61	Churruca	Federal Shipbuilding and Drydock Company, New Jersey	17 August 1944	18 March 1945	21 August 1972	15 September 1989
D-62	Gravina	Consolidated Steel Corporation, Texas	23 September 1944	9 March 1945	13 June 1972	30 September 1991
D-63	Méndez Núñez	Consolidated Steel Corporation, Texas	27 January 1945	22 June 1945	31 October 1973	3 April 1992
D-64	Lángara	Consolidated Steel Corporation, Texas	11 August 1944	20 January 1945	17 May 1978	3 April 1992
D-65	Blas de Lezo	Bath Iron Works, Maine	26 March 1945	30 July 1945	31 October 1973	1991

== Gallery ==
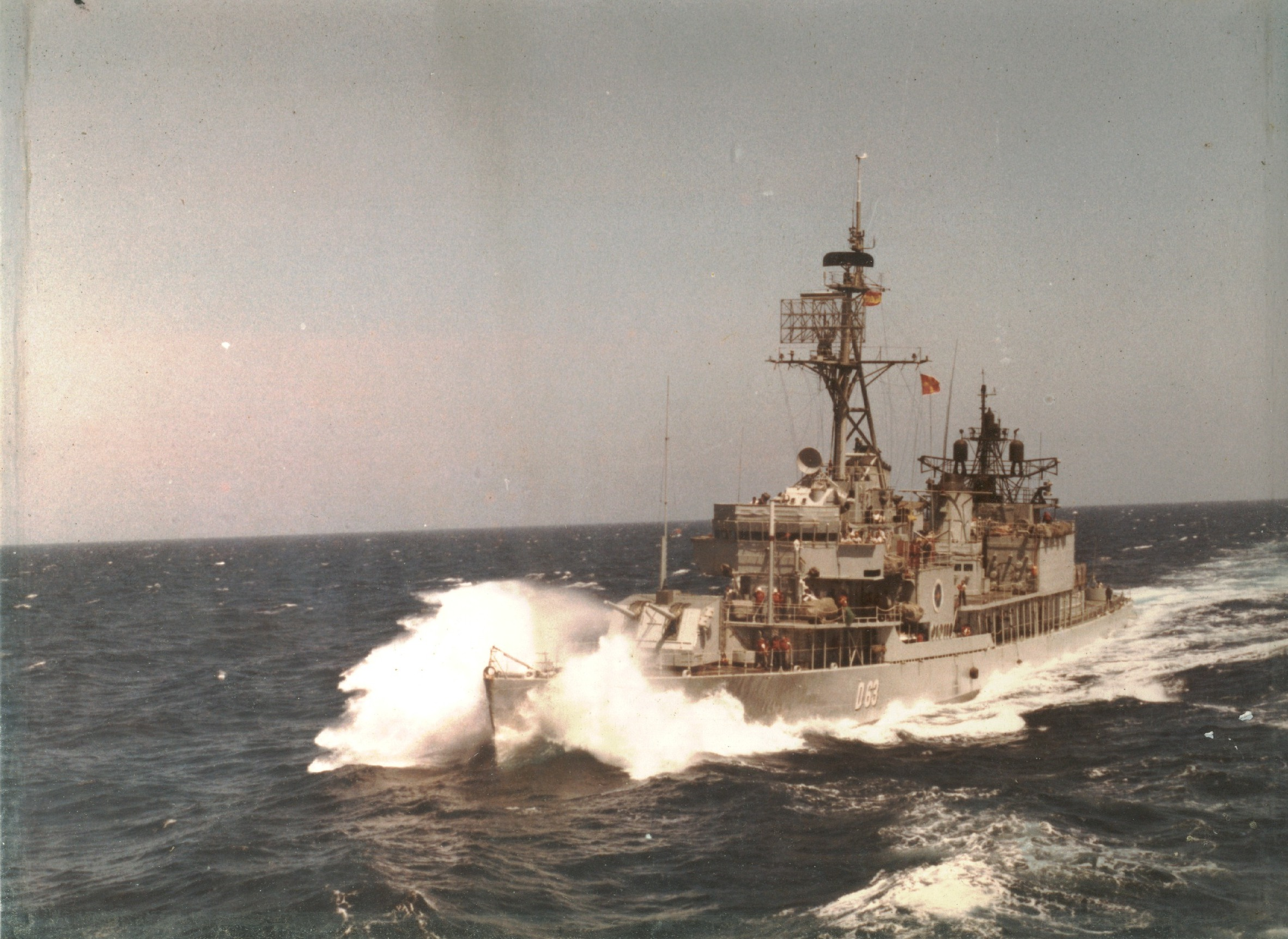
Méndez Núñez underway at sea, date unknown.

== See also ==
- Lepanto-class destroyer - another class of destroyers transferred from the US Navy to Armada Española
