= Loveman Noa =

United States Navy officer

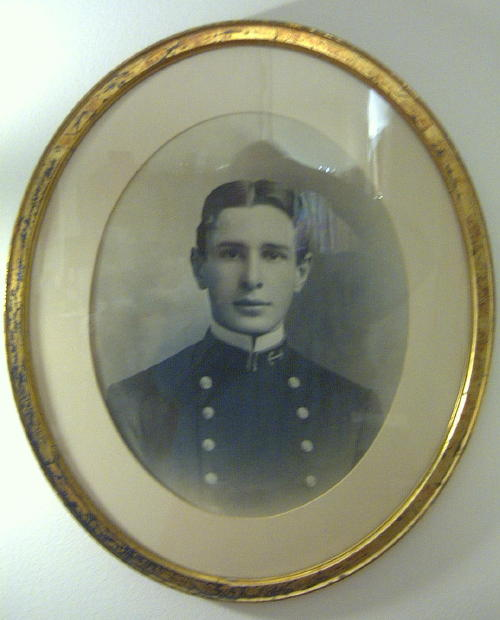
- Born: David Bernard Loveman Noa; October 5, 1878; Chattanooga, Tennessee
- Died: October 23, 1901 (aged 22); Philippines
- Resting place: Chattanooga National Cemetery

David Bernard Loveman Noa (5 October 1878 – 26 October 1901) was an officer in the United States Navy. He was killed while on duty in the United States' newly acquired overseas territory of the Philippines. He is the namesake for two United States Navy destroyers.

== Biography ==
He was born in Chattanooga, Tennessee, to the Jewish immigrants, Ismar Noa (1836–1906) of Breslau, Prussia, (now Wrocław, Poland), and Rose B. Loveman (1842–1923) of Hungary. His siblings were Ernestine Noa (1871–1951); Bianca Noa (1874–1945) who married Albert Hodges Morehead, Sr. (1852–1922); and Wallace Noa (1876–1908). His maternal uncle was David Barnard Loveman, who had moved to Chattanooga and started the Lovemans department store.

Noa was appointed to the U.S. Naval Academy as a naval cadet (Note: In 1882, Congress eliminated the distinction between engineer and naval cadets, and designated the student officers as naval cadets; the name reverted to midshipman in 1902. See:"A Brief History of the US Naval Academy". United States Navy.) on September 5, 1896. He graduated in June 1900. He was ordered to the Asiatic Station in gunboat Mariveles. On the morning of October 26, 1901 Midshipman Noa, with an armed crew of six men, put off from the Mariveles in a small boat to watch for craft engaged in smuggling contraband from the island of Leyte to Samar. When ready to return to the Mariveles, they found the wind and the tide against them. The boat was taking on water, and they put into a small cove on the island of Samar. While scouting the adjacent jungle, Noa was attacked and stabbed five times by Filipino insurgents, three times in the abdomen, one in the chest, and one in his left shoulder. He was then given a blow to the head. He died after fifteen minutes, before aid could reach him. He was buried in the Chattanooga National Cemetery.

== Legacy ==
USS Noa (DD-343) and USS Noa (DD-841) were named for him; DD-841 was the ship that recovered John Glenn's Friendship 7 after his historic orbital flight in 1962.
