= Oquendo-class destroyer =

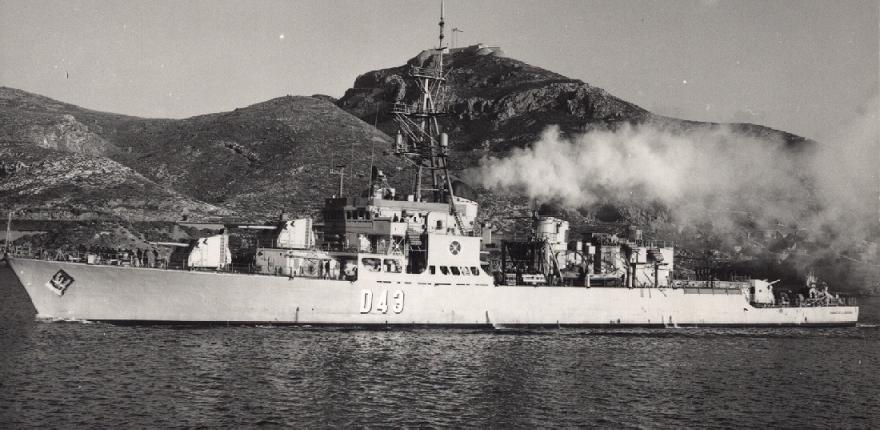
- Marqués de la Ensenada at Cartagena, Spain

Class overview
- Builders: Bazán, Ferrol, Galicia
- Operators: Spanish Navy
- Preceded by: Lepanto class
- Succeeded by: Churruca class
- Built: 1951–1970
- In commission: 1963–1988
- Planned: 9
- Completed: 3
- Cancelled: 6
- Scrapped: 3

General characteristics
- Type: Destroyer
- Displacement: 3,004 ton
- Length: 116.5 m (382 ft)
- Beam: Original: 11 m (36 ft); Modernized: 13 m (43 ft)
- Draught: Original: 5 m (16 ft); Modernized: 5.8 m (19 ft)
- Propulsion: 3 Bretagne steam boilers; 2 Rateau turbines; 2 propellers
- Speed: Original: 32.5 kn (60.2 km/h; 37.4 mph); Modernized: 31 kn (57 km/h; 36 mph)
- Range: 3,200 nmi (5,900 km; 3,700 mi) at 20 kn (37 km/h; 23 mph)
- Complement: Original: 252; Modernized: 318
- Sensors & processing systems: Original; Radar: Marconi SNW-10 2-D, air; Type 293Q, surface; Sonar: QHB scanning sonar; Fire Control: Vickers-Armstrong with radar type 275M (120 mm); Vickers-Armstrong with radar type 262P (40 mm); Modernized; Radar: SPS-40A 2-D, air; AN/SPS-10F, surface; Sonar: AN/SQS-32; AN/SQA-10 variable depth (VDS); Fire Control: Mk37, Mk56, and Mk68 fire control system; Mk114 for ASW weaponry
- Electronic warfare & decoys: Modernized: AN/WLR-1
- Armament: Original: 4 120 mm/50 cal. DP cannon (2x2); 6 40 mm/70 cal. Bofors 40 mm gun; 2 Mk32 torpedo 533 mm (21.0 in); 2 Mk11 Hedgehog ASW mortar; Modernized: 6 127 mm/38 cal. DP cannon (3x2); 2 Mk44 324 mm (12.8 in)
- Aircraft carried: Hughes 369
- Aviation facilities: hangar and landing pad for ASW helicopter

The Oquendo-class destroyers was a class of three destroyers built for the Spanish Navy. The nine initially projected Oquendo-class destroyers were the most ambitious project fronted by the programs of naval construction of the post-war period in Spain; however, the adoption of Rateau/Bretagne propulsion system, being of a low reliability and high complexity, coupled with the limited capacity of the shipbuilding industry in Spain at the time, led to one of the largest investor fiascos of the Spanish Navy in the 20th century. These ships would be assigned the names and numbers of; D-41 Oquendo, D-42 Roger de Lauria, and D-43 Marqués de la Ensenada.

They were named after Admiral Antonio de Oquendo.

== Original order ==
The Oquendo class was original provisioned in 1943 with the ordering of nine ships. Besides the three ships that were built their names would have been "Blas de Lezo", "Gelmírez", "Lángara", "Bonifaz", "Recalde", and "Blasco de Garay".

== Difficulties with construction ==
The Oquendos were, from the beginning a headache for their designers. The first ship was not launched until 1959, 15 years after initial procurement of material, despite asking for assistance from Ateliers Bretagne in 1955 in order to finish the power plant.

In response to the slow progress of the class, it was decided to radically alter the last two vessels of the class being built, with both being towed from Ferrol to Cartagena, Spain where the ships were literally cut in half lengthwise in order to widen the ships in an effort to resolve some of the stability issues experienced in the original Oquendo. In addition the Spanish Navy attempted to procure modern weaponry and sensors for these vessels. After initial attempts to purchase English arms, it was decided to mount the FRAM II system commonly used on the American destroyers of the era.

With the design amendments, reading of the features of Roger de Lauria and Marqués de la Ensenada would indicate that these were modern and well-equipped ships for their time, at least on paper. Despite the best conversion efforts, these ships made similar mistakes as the previous Audaz-class destroyer, the original power plant and machinery was kept. As a result, despite being the first ships built in Spain that were equipped with advanced electronic warfare equipment, helicopter facilities, a complete anti-submarine warfare combat system, including variable depth sonar, these ships were limited in their operational capacity from the beginning. Moreover, the enormous amount of resources put into this project prevented the funding and addressing of other possible improvement programs.

The result of these issues was that the Oquendo-class ships had relatively short life spans for the type and time period, being 15, 13, and 18 years for Oquendo, Roger de Lauria, and Marqués de la Ensenada respectively. In addition, the 18 years of service for Marqués de la Ensenada was not due to good performance, but to the fact that in 1981, when Marqués de la Ensenada was about to be discharged, she was damaged in Santander by a bomb planted by the ETA in the line of flotation buoys around the ship. In order to avoid the image of the destruction of a ship that had just suffered a terrorist attack, along with the consequent advertising by the attackers, it was decided to maintain the vessel in service, prolonging its lifespan thru 1988.

== Operations ==
Oquendo was assigned to the 21st Escort Squadron of Cartagena along with the Lepanto-class destroyers. This squadron was sometimes affectionately called "Los Cinco Latinos". Meanwhile Roger de Lauria and Marqués de la Ensenada were assigned to the 11th Escort Squadron along with the Churruca-class destroyers.

In 1971 Marqués de la Ensenada sailed on an international tour of European waters making port calls at Naples, Casablanca, and Portsmouth. Besides the ETA attack previously mentioned the destroyers of the Oquendo class led relatively quiet careers.

== Ships of the class ==
Three ships of the Oquendo class were built.

Name	Number	Year launched	End of service	Cause	Comment
Oquendo	D-41	1963	1978	retired	scrapped
Roger de Lauria	D-42	1969	1982	retired	scrapped
Marqués de la Ensenada	D-43	1970	1988	retired	scrapped

== See also ==
- Fernando Villaamil
- Antonio de Oquendo
