= USS Guadalcanal (LPH-7) =

American amphibious assault ship

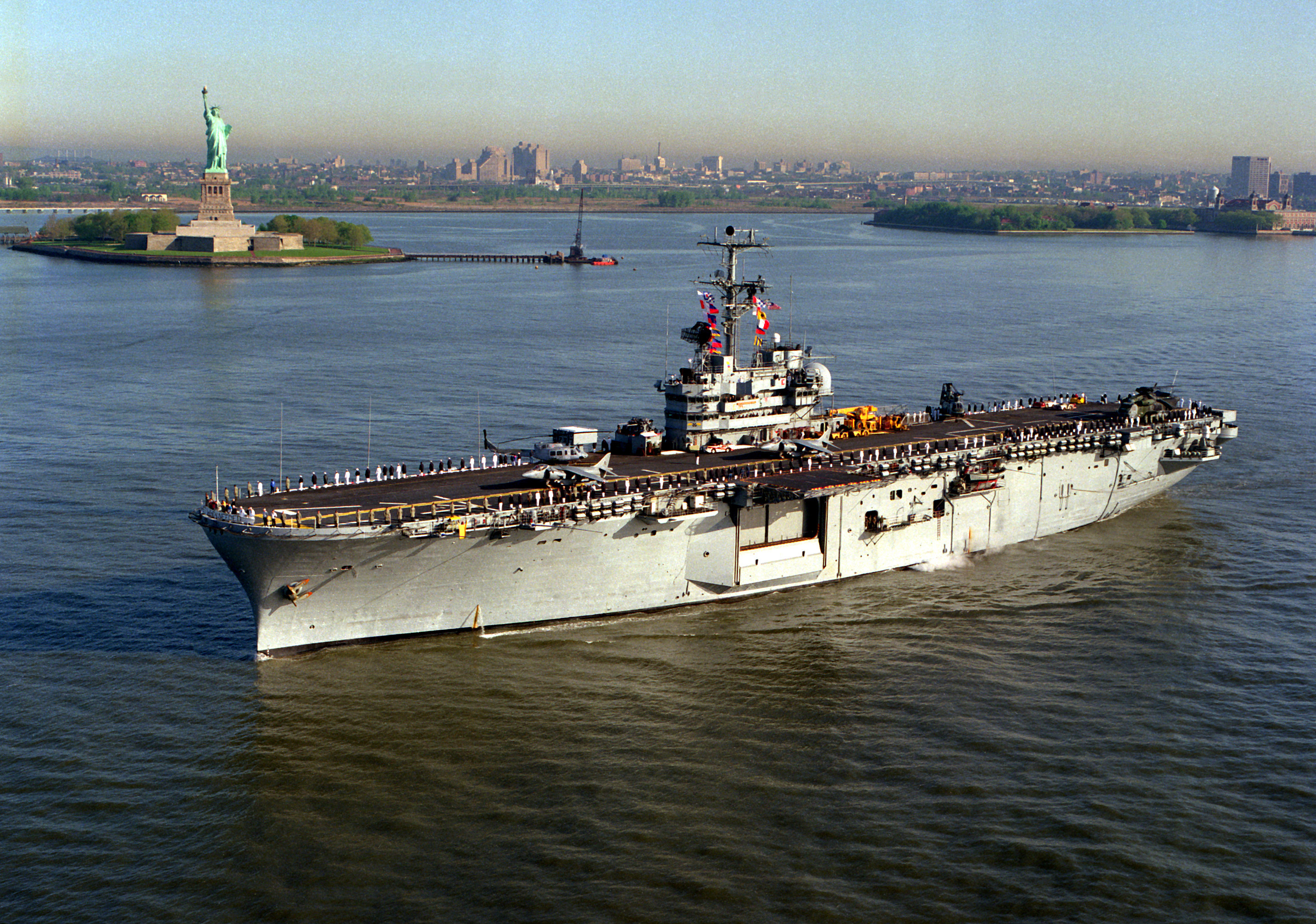
- USS Guadalcanal in New York in 1992

History

United States
- Name: Guadalcanal
- Namesake: Battle of Guadalcanal
- Ordered: 21 December 1959
- Builder: Philadelphia Naval Shipyard
- Laid down: 1 September 1961
- Launched: 16 March 1963
- Commissioned: 20 July 1963
- Decommissioned: 31 August 1994
- Stricken: 31 August 1994
- Identification: Callsign: NIEG; Hull number: LPH-7
- Motto: There When Needed
- Nickname(s): The Golden Guad
- Fate: Sunk as target, 19 May 2005

General characteristics
- Class & type: Iwo Jima-class amphibious assault ship
- Displacement: 19,395 tons
- Length: 602.3 ft (183.6 m)
- Beam: 84 ft (26 m)
- Draught: 27 ft (8.2 m)
- Propulsion: 2 × 600 psi (4.1 MPa) boilers, one 22 ft (7 m) diameter screw, 23,000 shaft horse power
- Speed: 23 knots (26 mph; 43 km/h)
- Complement: 685 (47 officer, 638 enlisted)
- Armament: Initially: 2 × 2 3-inch (76 mm) / 50 caliber DP guns, 8 cell Sea Sparrow BPDMS launchers; Later: 2 × Phalanx CIWS
- Aircraft carried: 11 × CH-53 Sea Stallions; 20 × CH-46 Sea Knights; (representative, actual complement was mixed, including UH-1s and AH-1W Super Cobras)

USS Guadalcanal (LPH-7), the third Iwo Jima–class amphibious assault ship (helicopter), was launched by the Philadelphia Naval Shipyard 16 March 1963, sponsored by Zola Shoup, wife of General Shoup, the former Commandant of the Marine Corps; and commissioned 20 July 1963. It was the second ship in the Navy to bear the name.

== Operational history ==
Upon completion of sea trials and outfitting, Guadalcanal departed Philadelphia to join the Amphibious Forces, U.S. Atlantic Fleet. One of a new class of ships designed from the keel up to embark, transport, and land assault marines by means of helicopters, she lent new strength and flexibility to amphibious operations. After departing Norfolk 23 October 1963 for six weeks' shakedown training at Guantanamo Bay, Cuba, Guadalcanal steamed to Onslow Beach, North Carolina, 6 December for practice amphibious landings. She then carried on training and readiness operations with the Atlantic Fleet, based in Norfolk until departing for Panama on 11 February 1964. Following two months on station as flagship for Commander PhibRon 12 with the 12 Marine Expeditionary Unit embarked and ready to land anywhere needed. Guadalcanal entered Philadelphia Naval Shipyard 26 May, but was deployed again 7 October as a unit of Operation "Steel Pike 1", a NATO landing exercise on the beaches of southern Spain.

Career highlights include 21 July 1966, when she recovered the Gemini X astronauts and their spacecraft after they landed in the Atlantic east of Cape Kennedy, and 13 March 1969, when she recovered the Apollo 9 capsule and crew off the Bahamas. In October 1985 the ship logged its 100,000th aircraft landing.

In 1987 Guadalcanal was leading minesweeping operations in the Persian Gulf when she encountered Iran Ajr laying mines in the shipping lanes. Helicopters from Guadalcanal attacked the ship; troops from Guadalcanal boarded and captured the ship. (Iran Ajr was the second enemy warship captured on the high seas by the U.S. Navy since 1815; the first was the German submarine U-505, captured in 1944 by the first USS Guadalcanal (CVE-60), an escort carrier.) Guadalcanal also provided the Marines for the first wave of Operation Provide Comfort, the Kurdish relief operations in Northern Iraq immediately following the Persian Gulf War in 1991.

Guadalcanal was decommissioned in 1994, and stored as part of the James River Reserve Fleet until she was used as a target and sunk in the Virginia Capes area on 19 May 2005.

When the ship was being decommissioned, the Intrepid Sea, Air & Space Museum in New York City tried to acquire Guadalcanal, berth her next to the USS Intrepid, and use her as a floating heliport to replace the West 30th Street Heliport. The plan was abandoned in 1996 after local residents objected that Guadalcanal would block their views of the Hudson River.

== Other incidents ==
On 1 November 1966, a UH-2B Seasprite helicopter assigned to the ship crashed as it was taking off from the flight deck. Guadalcanal was in the Naval Shipyard in Portsmouth, VA to start a major overhaul at the time. Three Navy men and one civilian shipyard worker were killed and 12 others were hospitalized. Nine more sailors and civilians were treated for minor injuries.

On 9 May 1968 she floated adrift off North Carolina due to a burned out bearing in the propulsion system.

On 27 January 1976 she ran aground in Augusta Bay, Sicily, on a peak of coral which pushed in areas on either side of the bow, but did not crack or hole the ship. Three days later, with cargo, personnel, helicopters, and fuel off-loaded to assist the effort, the ship was refloated.

On 17 September 1981 near Sardinia, Italy, a USMC CH-53D helicopter crashed while attempting to land aboard the ship during training exercises, killing all five crewmen.

On 24 September 1981 Guadalcanal and the USNS Waccamaw (T-AO-109), collided during underway replenishment south of Sardinia, Italy, causing minor damage but no injuries.

On 25 May 1993 Guadalcanal and the USS Monongahela (AO-178) collided during underway replenishment off of Cape Hatteras, North Carolina when Guadalcanal's main gyrocompass failed. Five crew suffered minor injuries and $1.635M in damage was caused to the two ships.

== Awards ==
- Joint Meritorious Unit Award
- Navy Unit Commendation with 4 awards
- Navy Meritorious Unit Commendation with 4 awards
- Navy Battle "E" Ribbon with 4 awards
- Navy Expeditionary Medal with 4 awards (1: Iran/Indian Ocean; 2: Lebanon; 1: Libya)
- National Defense Service Medal with 2 awards
- Armed Forces Expeditionary Medal with 6 awards (3: Dominican Republic; 1: Lebanon; 1: Persian Gulf; 1: Op. Restore Hope, Somalia)
- Southwest Asia Service Medal
- Humanitarian Service Medal
- Sea Service Deployment Ribbon—multiple

== Gallery ==
USS Guadalcanal Lifecycle

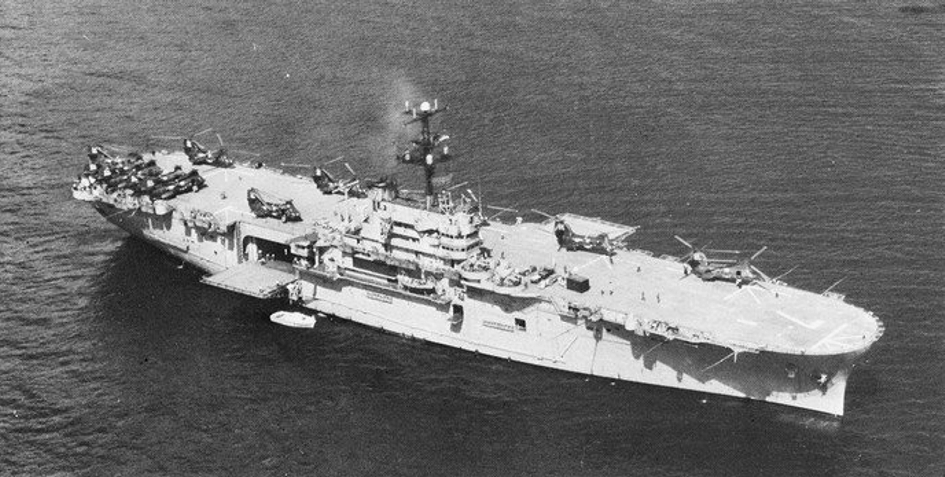
USS Guadalcanal at anchor in 1968.

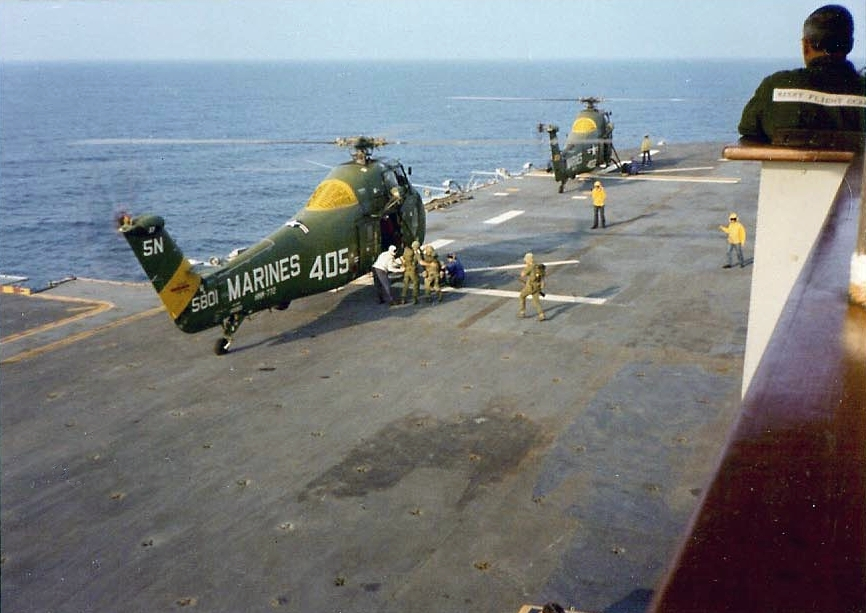
Two UH-34Ds from HMM-772 on USS Guadalcanal in 1971.

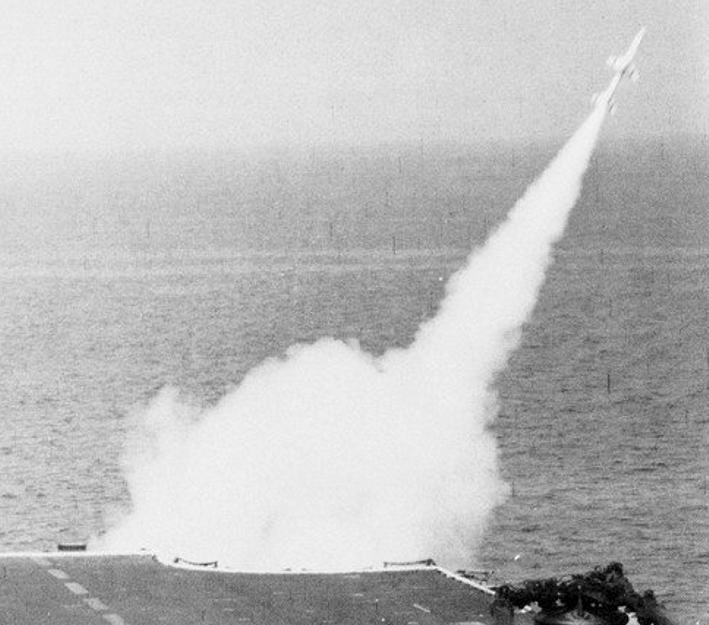
USS Guadalcanal launches a RIM-7 Sea Sparrow Missile in 1983.

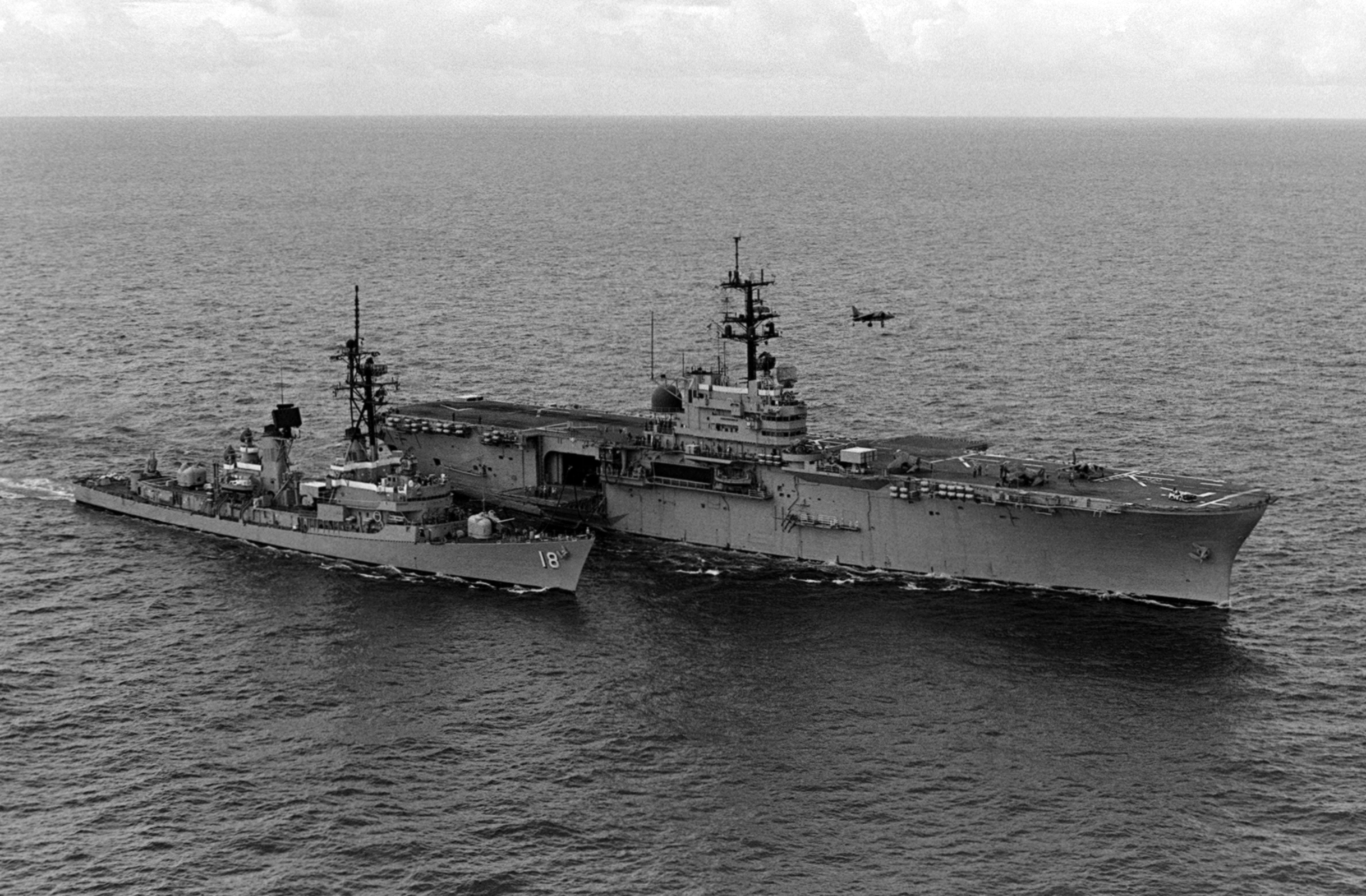
USS Guadalcanal refueling USS Semmes (DDG-18) in 1983.

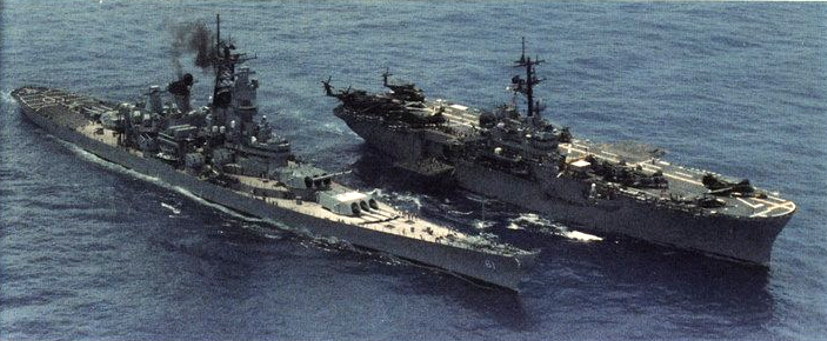
USS Guadalcanal alongside USS Iowa (BB-61) underway in 1987.

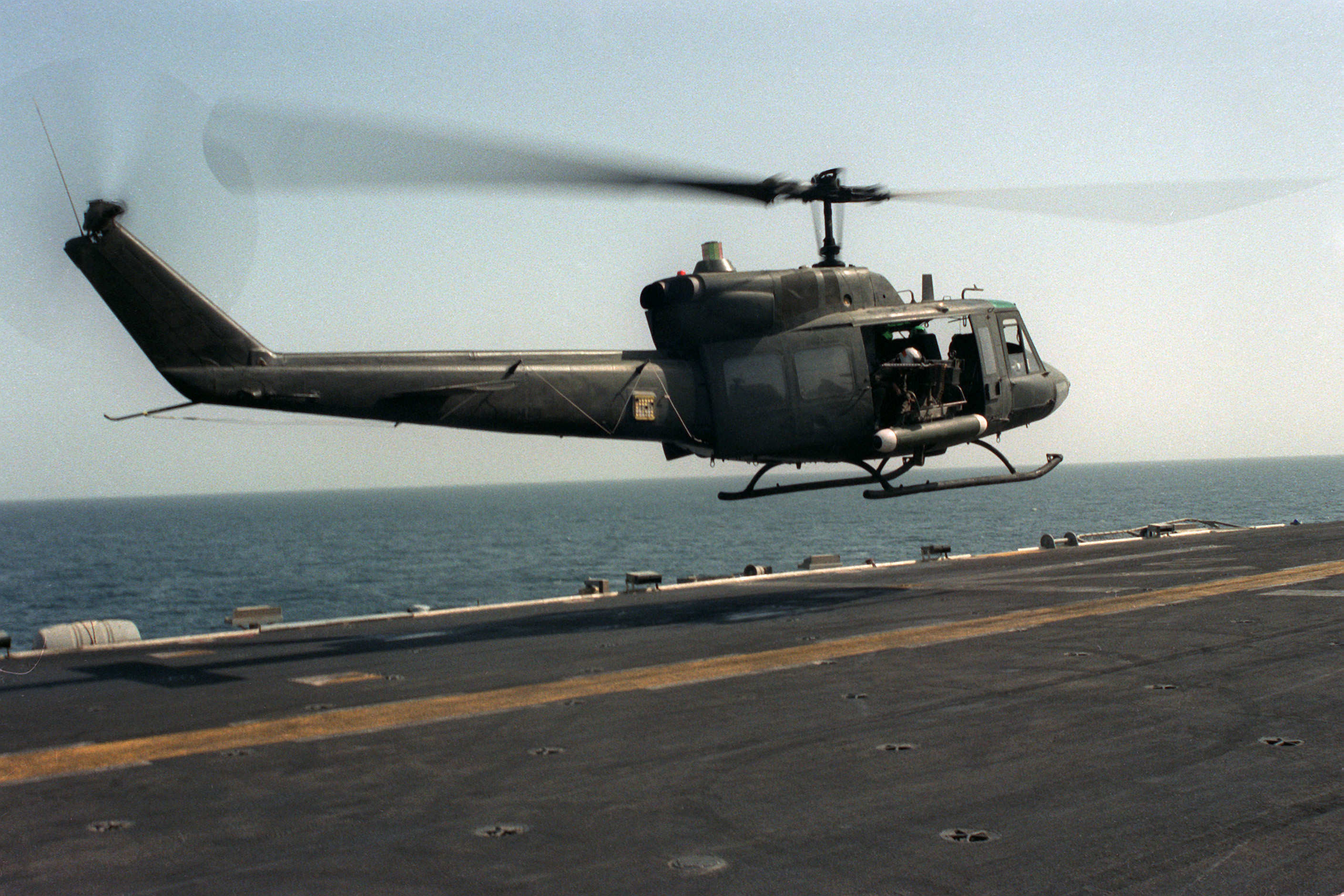
An UH-1N Huey landing on USS Guadalcanal in 1987.

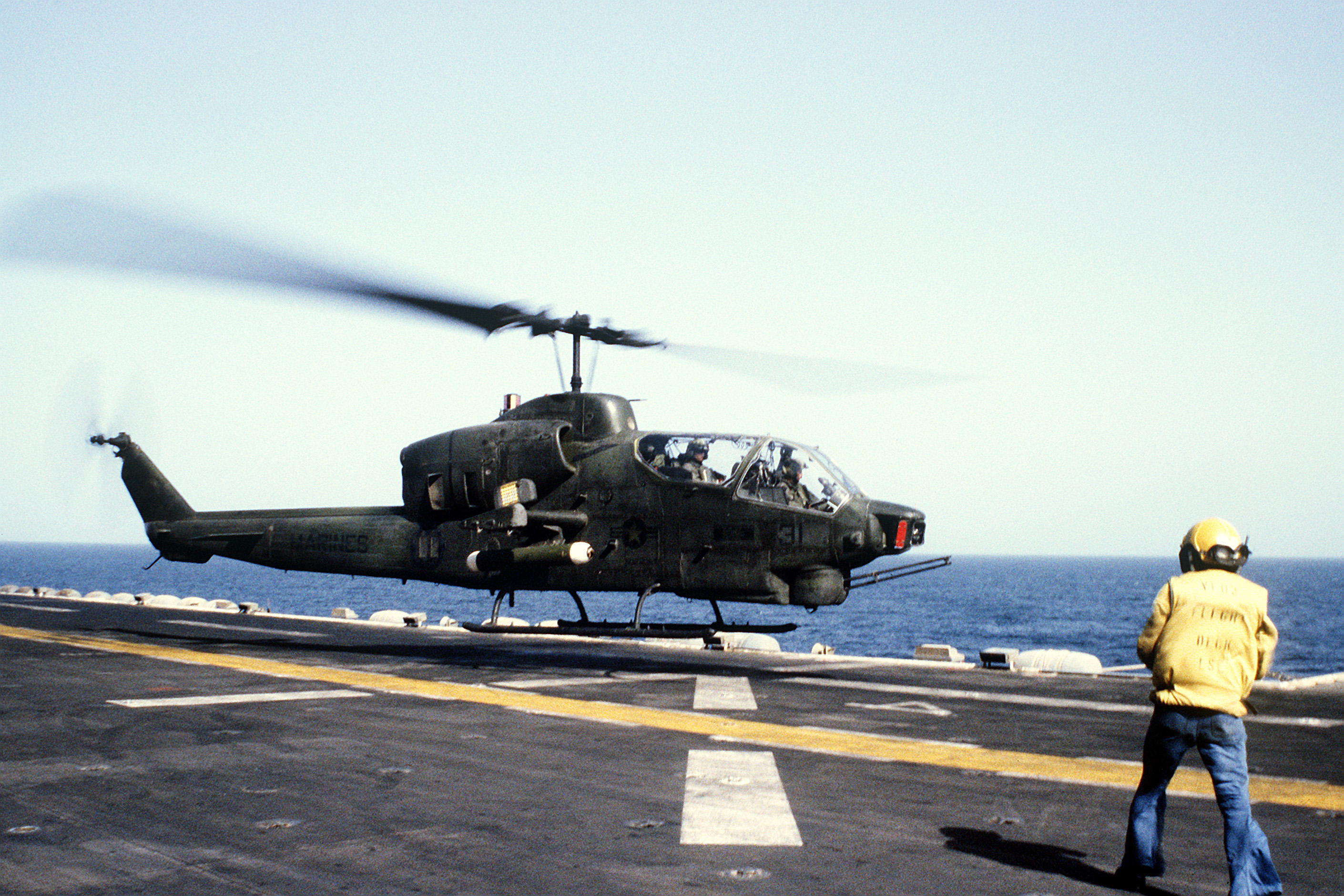
AH-1T Cobra takes off from USS Guadalcanal in 1987.

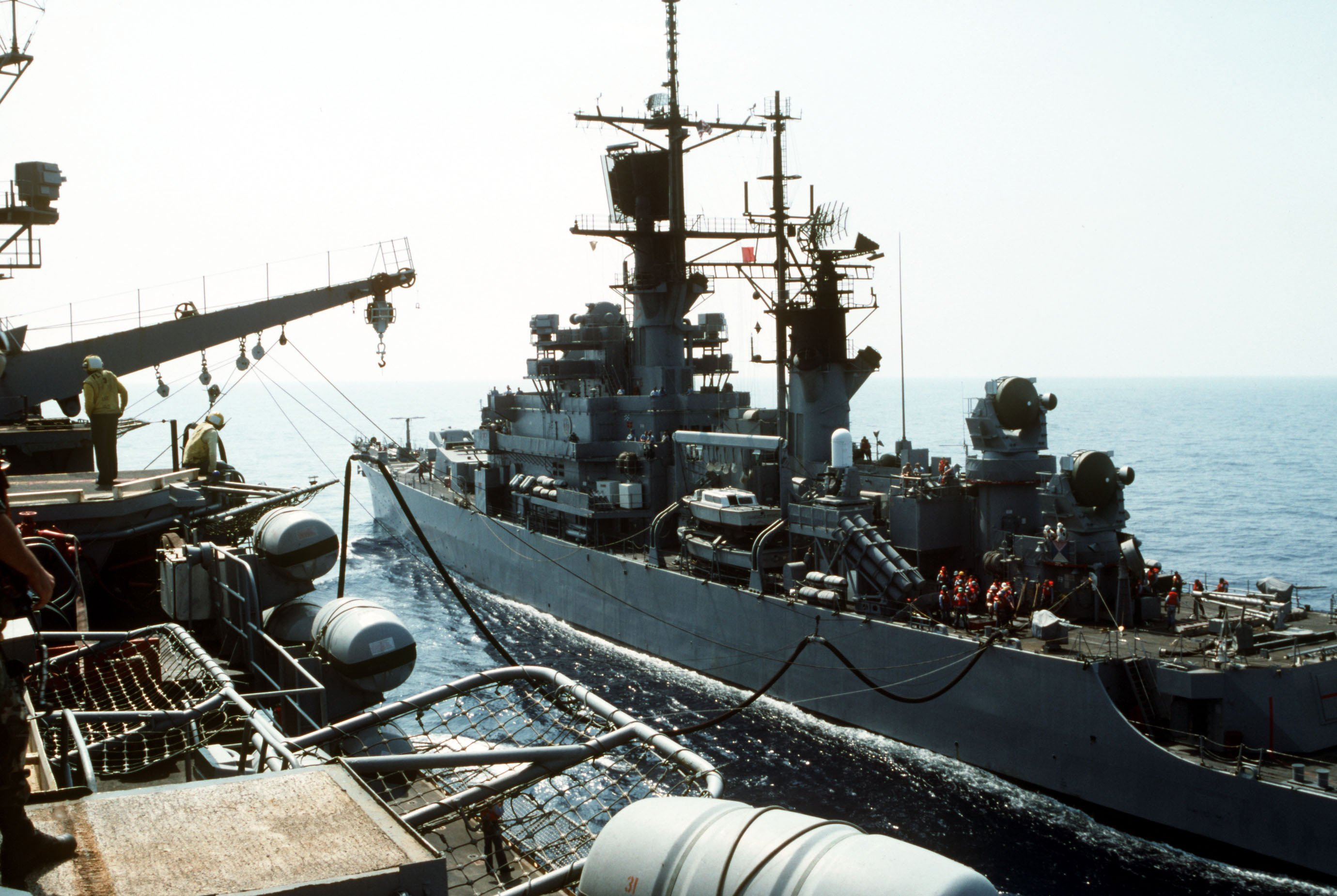
USS Richmond K. Turner (CG-20) steams alongside USS Guadalcanal on 18 May 1991.

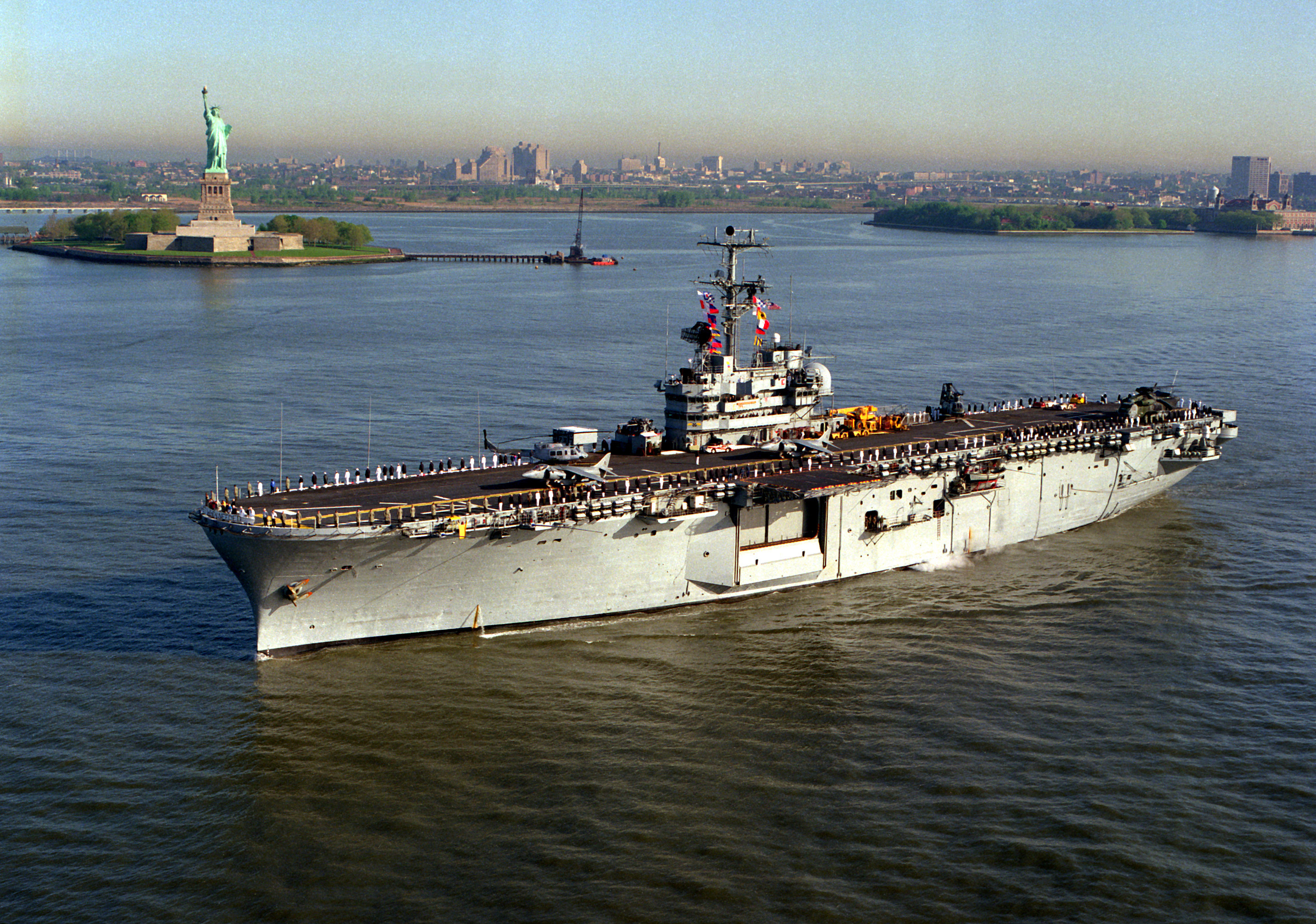
USS Guadalcanal passing the Statue of Liberty during Fleet Week New York 1992.

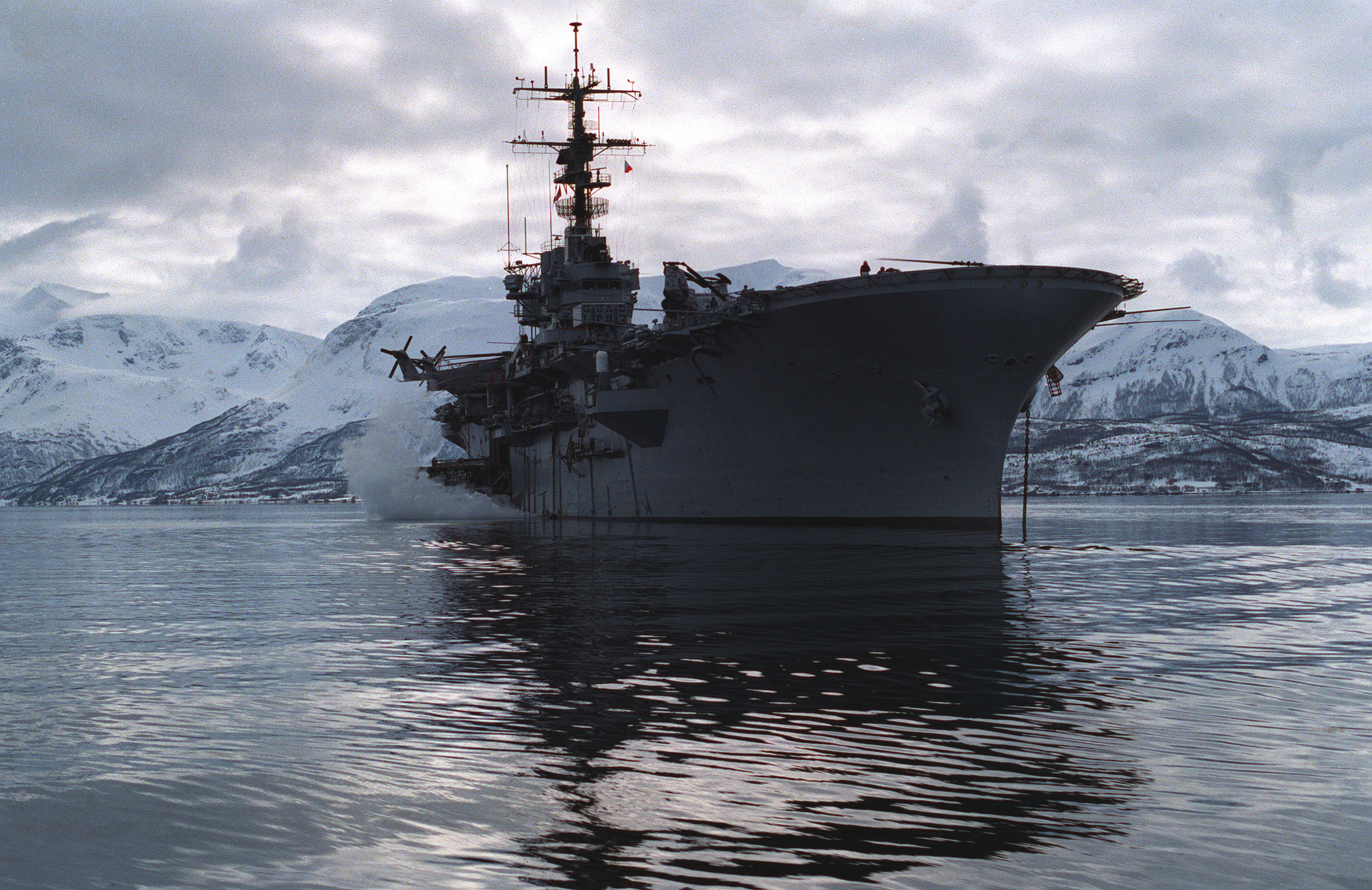
USS Guadalcanal during Exercise Teamwork in 1992.
