= USS Eugene A. Greene =

Gearing-class destroyer

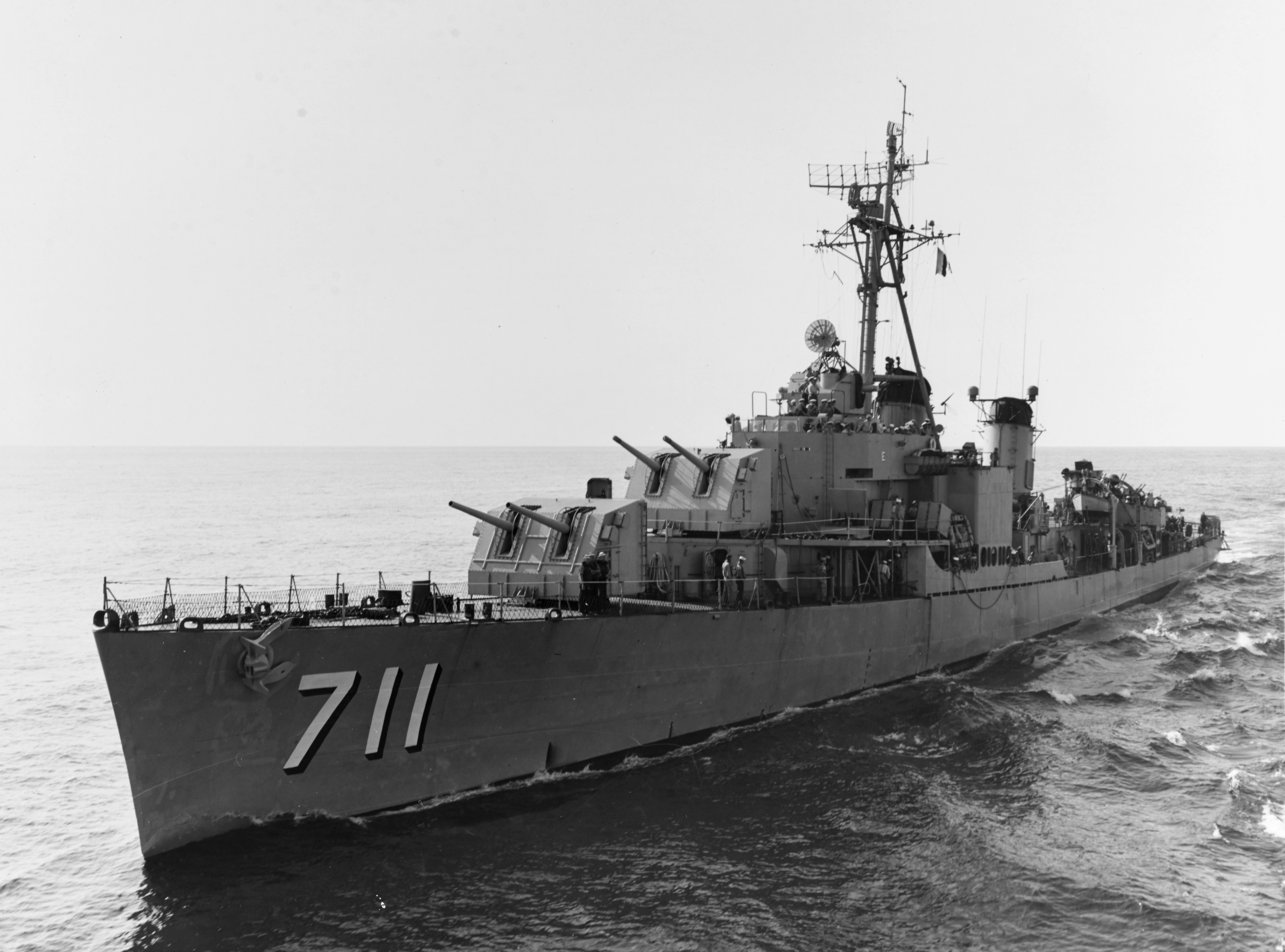
- USS Eugene A. Greene underway in 1951

History

United States
- Name: Eugene A. Greene
- Namesake: Eugene A. Greene
- Builder: Federal Shipbuilding and Drydock Company
- Laid down: 17 August 1944
- Launched: 18 March 1945
- Commissioned: 8 June 1945
- Decommissioned: 31 August 1972
- Stricken: 2 June 1975
- Identification: Callsign: NHFG; Hull number: DD-711
- Motto: On The Affirmative Way
- Fate: Transferred to Spain, 31 August 1972
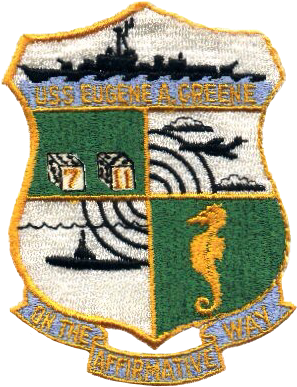
- Badge

Spain
- Name: Churruca
- Namesake: Cosme Damián de Churruca y Elorza
- Acquired: 31 August 1972
- Stricken: 15 September 1989
- Identification: Hull number: D-61
- Fate: Sunk as target, 12 December 1991

General characteristics
- Class & type: Gearing-class destroyer; Churruca-class destroyer
- Displacement: 3,460 long tons (3,516 t) full
- Length: 390 ft 6 in (119.02 m)
- Beam: 40 ft 10 in (12.45 m)
- Draft: 14 ft 4 in (4.37 m)
- Propulsion: Geared turbines, 2 shafts, 60,000 shp (45 MW)
- Speed: 35 knots (65 km/h; 40 mph)
- Range: 4,500 nmi (8,300 km) at 20 kn (37 km/h; 23 mph)
- Complement: 336
- Armament: 6 × 5-inch/38-caliber guns; 12 × 40 mm AA guns; 11 × 20 mm AA guns; 10 × 21 inch (533 mm) torpedo tubes; 6 × depth charge projectors; 2 × depth charge tracks

USS Eugene A. Greene (DD/DDR-711) was a Gearing-class destroyer of the United States Navy, named for Ensign Eugene A. Greene (1921–1942), who was posthumously awarded the Navy Cross for his heroism in the Battle of Midway.

== Namesake ==
Eugene A. Greene was born on 21 November 1914 in Smithtown, New York. Greene grew up in Smithtown and Mineola, New York, graduating from St. Francis High School in 1932. He graduated Rhode Island State College, now Rhode Island University, in June 1940, before enlisting in the United States Naval Reserve on 13 January 1941, and after aviation training, was commissioned ensign on 30 August 1941.

On 4 June 1942 during the Battle of Midway Greene was piloting a Douglas SBD Dauntless dive bomber in Bombing Squadron 6 (VB-6) based on the aircraft carrier USS Enterprise. He broke through heavy Imperial Japanese Navy fighter and antiaircraft opposition to dive-bomb the aircraft carrier Kaga. Greene survived the attack on the Kaga, ENS Lewis Hopkins said his plane formed up with him on his wing. Eventually Greene's aircraft ran out of fuel and he was forced to ditch in the ocean. He and his gunner were never seen again. Greene was posthumously awarded the Navy Cross. In 1943, the name Eugene A. Greene was assigned to the U.S. Navy destroyer escort USS Eugene A. Greene (DE-549), but its construction was cancelled in 1944 before completion.

== Service history ==
Eugene A. Greene was launched on 18 March 1945 by Federal Shipbuilding and Drydock Co., Kearny, N.J.; sponsored by Mrs. Anita M. Greene, widow of Ensign Greene; and commissioned on 8 June 1945.

=== US Navy, 1945–1972 ===
Eugene A. Greene operated along the east coast and in the Caribbean on shakedown training, acting as plane guard during the qualification of pilots in carrier operations, and training men for the crews of new destroyers. From her home port in Norfolk, Virginia, she sailed to Guantanamo Bay for training early in 1947, and on 13 February sailed in a task group bound for Montevideo, Uruguay, to participate in the festivities accompanying the inauguration of Uruguay's President Luis Berres. The group also paid a good will visit to Rio de Janeiro before returning to Norfolk on 31 March.

On 10 November 1947 Eugene A. Greene sailed on the first of nine Mediterranean cruises made over the next thirteen years. Voyages to northern Europe and the Arctic varied the routine of overseas deployment.

Eugene A. Greene was placed out of commission from 1 April 1952 to 1 December 1952, during which period she was being converted to a radar picket destroyer. She was redesignated DDR-711 on 18 July 1952.

Greene reverted to DD-711 on 15 March 1963.

On 18 June 1970 the Greene and the oiler Waccamaw (AO-109) were involved in a minor collision in the eastern Mediterranean during refueling operations.

Eugene A. Greene was decommissioned on 31 August 1972 at Norfolk, and, along with four other destroyers, was loaned to Spain.

=== Spanish Navy, 1972–1991 ===
The ship was commissioned in the Spanish Navy as Churruca (D61), named after Lieutenant General Cosme Damián de Churruca y Elorza (1761–1805), who died during the Battle of Trafalgar.

Churruca was decommissioned on 15 September 1989; she was spent as a target on 12 December 1991. Churruca was sunk by 76 mm naval gunfire, Harpoon and Standard surface-to-surface missiles, laser guided bombs from F-18 aircraft and gravity bombs from AV-8B Harrier II Bravos belonging to the carrier Principe de Asturias.
