= USS Furse =

Gearing-class destroyer

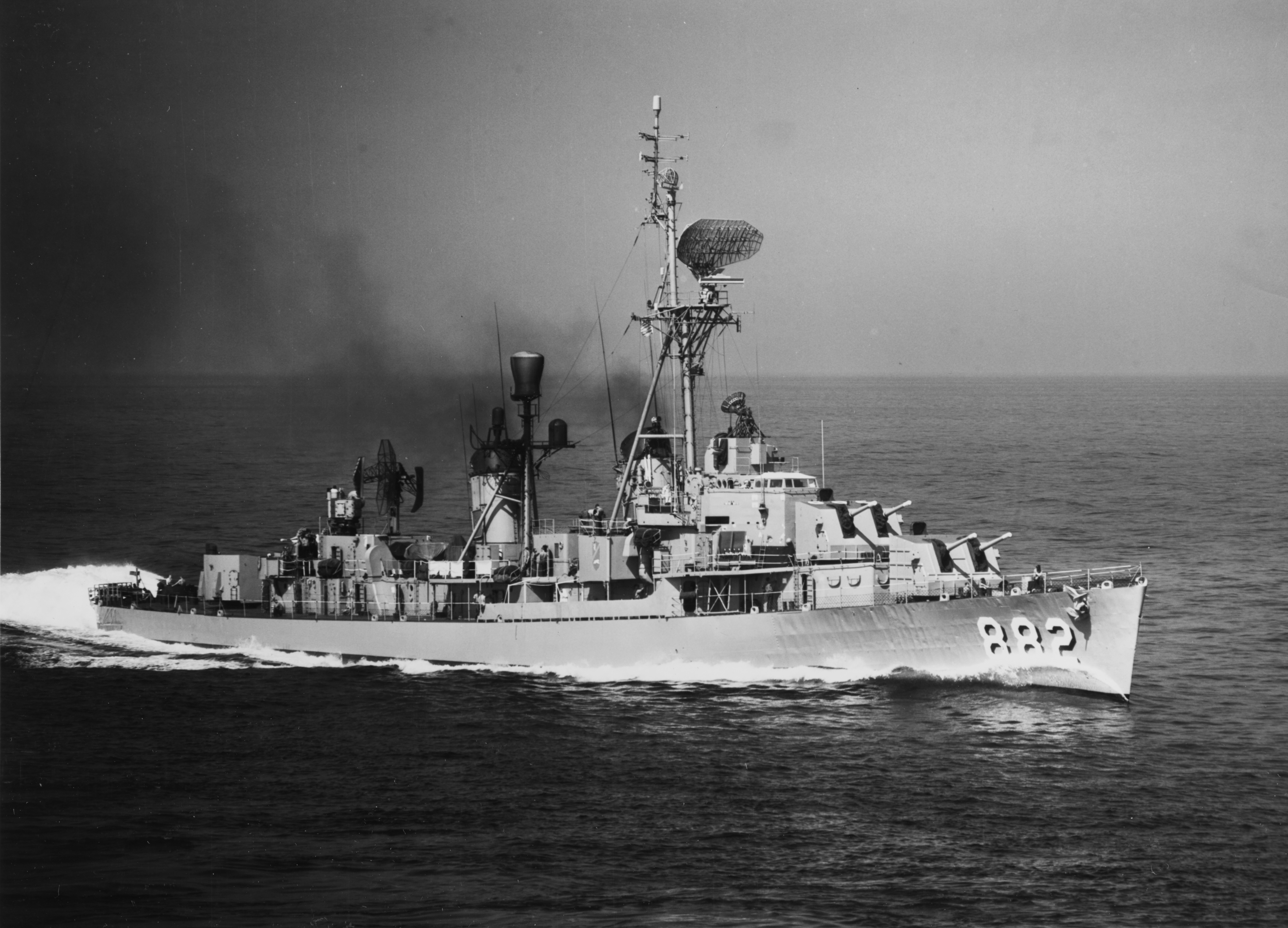
- USS Furse underway on 28 August 1961

History

United States
- Name: Furse
- Namesake: John H. Furse
- Builder: Consolidated Steel Corporation
- Laid down: 23 September 1944
- Launched: 9 March 1945
- Commissioned: 10 July 1945
- Decommissioned: 31 August 1972
- Reclassified: DDR-882, 18 March 1949
- Stricken: 2 June 1975
- Identification: Callsign: NBHY; Hull number: DD-882
- Motto: Sentinel of the Sea
- Fate: Transferred to Spain, 1972
- Notes: Sold to Spain, 17 May 1978
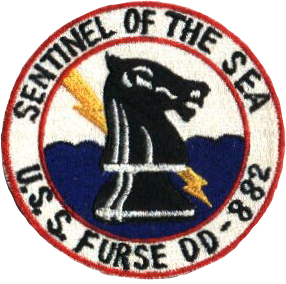
- Badge

Spain
- Name: Gravina
- Namesake: Federico Carlos Gravina y Nápoli
- Acquired: 1972
- Commissioned: 13 June 1972
- Decommissioned: 30 September 1991
- Identification: Hull number: D-62
- Fate: Scrapped, 1991

General characteristics
- Class & type: Gearing-class destroyer; Churruca-class destroyer
- Displacement: 3,460 long tons (3,516 t) full
- Length: 390 ft 6 in (119.02 m)
- Beam: 40 ft 10 in (12.45 m)
- Draft: 14 ft 4 in (4.37 m)
- Propulsion: Geared turbines, 2 shafts, 60,000 shp (45 MW)
- Speed: 36.8 knots (68.2 km/h; 42.3 mph)
- Range: 4,500 nmi (8,300 km) at 20 kn (37 km/h; 23 mph)
- Complement: 336
- Armament: 6 × 5"/38 caliber guns; 12 × 40 mm AA guns; 11 × 20 mm AA guns; 10 × 21 inch (533 mm) torpedo tubes; 6 × depth charge projectors; 2 × depth charge tracks

USS Furse (DD-882/DDR-882) was a Gearing-class destroyer of the United States Navy in commission from 1945 to 1972. She served as Gravina (D62) in the Spanish Navy from 1972 to 1991.

== Namesake ==
John Houseal Furse was born on 20 April 1880 in South Carolina. He was a member of the United States Naval Academy class of 1901. His first service was on the Asiatic Station, where he served in Manila during a scientific expedition, as well as in other ships. Returning to the United States, he joined the USS Illinois on 29 September 1904, and served in Cuban waters. Lieutenant Furse died on board Illinois on 30 September 1907, of injuries received fighting a storm which threatened the ship.

== Construction and commissioning ==
Furse was laid down by the Consolidated Steel Corporation at Orange, Texas on 23 September 1944, launched on 9 March 1945 by Miss Eugenia A. Furse, sister of Lieutenant Furse and commissioned on 10 July 1945.

== Service history ==
Furse sailed from Norfolk, Virginia on 7 November 1945 for occupation duty in the Far East, calling at San Diego, California and Pearl Harbor en route to Tokyo Bay, where she arrived on 22 December. After acting as courier between Nagoya and Wakayama, she conducted training operations out of Kobe, then sailed back to Pearl Harbor to prepare for participation in "Operation Crossroads". In this operation, atomic weapons tests in the Marshall Islands during the summer of 1946, Furse acted as plane guard to carriers of JTF 1.

The destroyer returned to San Diego on 12 August 1946, and until her transfer to the Atlantic Fleet in April 1949, operated on training along the west coast, and completed another tour of duty in the Far East. She was reclassified DDR-882 on 18 March 1949. She arrived at Newport, Rhode Island, on 21 April 1949. On 10 September, she sailed on the first of her tours of duty with the 6th Fleet in the Mediterranean Sea, which were annual, aside from 1951 and 1959, through 1960. From January 1951, Furse was homeported at Norfolk. (Her homeport from 1959 to 1962 was Charleston, South Carolina) Early in 1963 Furse was in the Shipyard in Philadelphia for FRAM overhaul.

Among the highlights of the destroyer's operations were visits to ports of northern Europe between September 1950 and December, during which she represented the United States at the funeral of King Gustav V of Sweden. From 1952 onward, she often served with the Operational Development Force, perfecting techniques in anti-submarine warfare. A midshipman summer cruise in 1952 again took her to ports of northern Europe. Marking her 1956 tour of duty in the Mediterranean was her participation in the evacuation of Americans from Israel and Egypt during the Suez Crisis, and lengthy patrol duty in the eastern Mediterranean. The next year, she made two tours of duty in the Mediterranean because of the tense political situation prevailing, and in the summer of 1958, she sailed for NATO operations in northern waters, visiting Santander, Spain; Stavanger, Norway; and Ghent, Belgium. In the periods between her deployments, Furse carried out the intensive training schedule of Destroyer Force, Atlantic Fleet, cruising the east coast and the Caribbean in operations with ships of all types and major fleet exercises.

Furse was part of the blockade in October 1962, during the Cuban Missile Crisis.

During June 1965 Furse was a unit of recovery force for the fourth Gemini astronaut space shot. In the winter of 1967, Furse spent time in the Boston Naval Shipyard receiving her regular yard overhaul period in preparation for a WESTPAC cruise in the summer of 1968. For a fuller description of this cruise, the first on which Furse was in active combat and was hit by enemy fire, see "School of Hard Knots", a memoir by junior officer on Furse, Henry (Hank) Abernathy. Captained by Michael T. Greeley USN, Furse operated with the Seventh Fleet in the Tonkin Gulf, including the recommissioned battleship USS New Jersey (BB 62). Shortly after her yard period, she took part in refresher training in Guantanamo Bay, Cuba followed by Fleet exercises in the Atlantic and Caribbean.

=== In Spanish Navy ===
Furse was decommissioned on 31 August 1972, and stricken from the Naval Vessel Register on 2 June 1975. She was transferred to Spain and renamed Gravina. Gravina was scrapped in 1991.
