= Lepanto-class destroyer =

Destroyers of the Spanish Navy

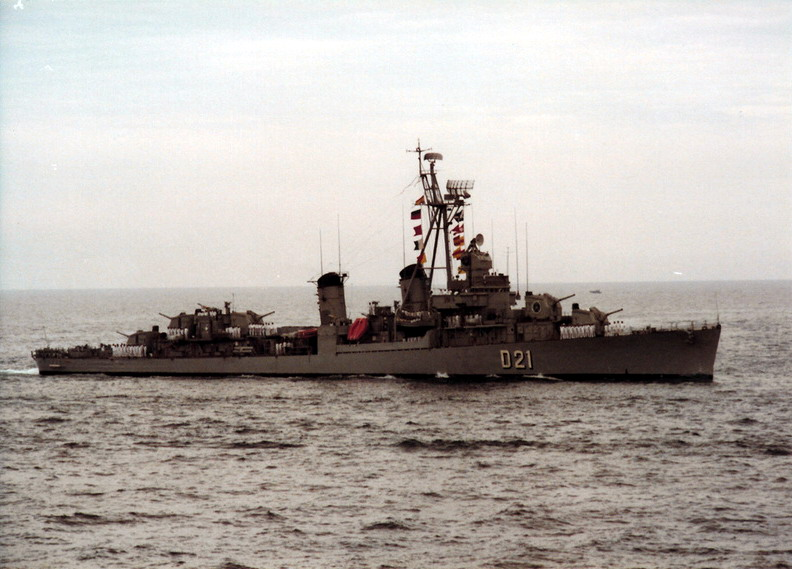
- Lepanto underway at sea, c. 1970s

Class overview
- Name: Lepanto class
- Builders: Gulf Shipbuilding Corporation; Bath Iron Works; Seattle-Tacoma Shipbuilding Corporation; Federal Shipbuilding and Drydock Company
- Operators: Spanish Navy
- Preceded by: Audaz class
- Succeeded by: Oquendo class
- Subclasses: Fletcher class
- Built: 1941–1943
- In commission: 1957–1988
- Planned: 5
- Completed: 5
- Retired: 5

General characteristics
- Type: Destroyer
- Displacement: 2,050 long tons (2,083 t) standard; 2,500 long tons (2,540 t) full
- Length: 376.5 ft (114.8 m)
- Beam: 39.5 ft 10 in (12.29 m)
- Draft: 17.5 ft 8 in (5.54 m)
- Propulsion: 4 × GM Mod. 16-278A diesel engines with electric drive, 60,000 shp (45 MW); 2 × screws
- Speed: 36.5 knots (67.6 km/h; 42.0 mph)
- Range: 5,500 nmi (10,200 km) at 15 kn (28 km/h; 17 mph)
- Complement: 329
- Sensors & processing systems: 1 × AN/SPS-6 air-search radar; 1 × AN/SPS-10 surface-search radar; 1 × Mark 37 Director
- Armament: 5 × single 5"/38 cal guns; 3 × twin 40 mm bofors; 3 × single Oerlikon 20 mm guns; 2 × triple Mark 44 torpedo tubes; 2 × Mark 10 Hedgehog mortars; 2 × depth charge track

The Lepanto class was a class of five destroyers of the Spanish Navy, which originated as United States Navy Fletcher-class destroyers. They entered service in 1957, with the last one being decommissioned in 1988.

== History ==
These are ships used by the United States Navy during World War II and slightly modernized in electronics and weaponry at the beginning of the 1950s. Throughout the 1960s they constituted the backbone of the Spanish Navy. Eventually, they were replaced in escort duties by the Descubierta-class corvettes in the early 1980s. However, they remained in service until well into the 1980s, by which point they were obsolete.

They received five destroyers of the Fletcher class for the Spanish Navy from the United States from 1957 to 1988 as part of the Military Assistance Program.

They were all put out of service between 1985 till 1988.

== Characteristics ==
Before the takeover, the ships were modernized to a considerable extent. All but three 20 mm Oerlikon cannons were removed and the three 40 mm Bofors guns remained. The electronics were modernized and the mast was replaced by a tripod mast.

All five ships were retrofitted with two triple Mark 44 torpedo tubes on each side of the ship.

== Ships in the class ==
Pennant	Name	Builders	Laid down	Launched	Commissioned	Decommissioned
D21	Lepanto	Gulf Shipbuilding Corporation	12 June 1941	31 May 1942	15 May 1957	31 December 1985
D22	Almirante Ferrándiz	Gulf Shipbuilding Corporation	12 June 1941	4 July 1942	15 May 1957	17 November 1987
D23	Almirante Valdés	Bath Iron Works	23 February 1942	30 August 1942	1 July 1959	17 November 1986
D24	Alcalá Galiano	Seattle-Tacoma Shipbuilding Corporation	7 June 1943	14 February 1944	3 November 1960	15 December 1988
D25	Jorge Juan	Federal Shipbuilding and Drydock Company	30 June 1943	14 November 1943	1 December 1960	15 November 1988

== See also ==
- Churruca-class destroyer (1972) (Gearing-class destroyer): Another group of destroyers transferred to Spain
