= USS Noa (DD-841) =

US Navy Gearing-class destroyer in service 1945-1973

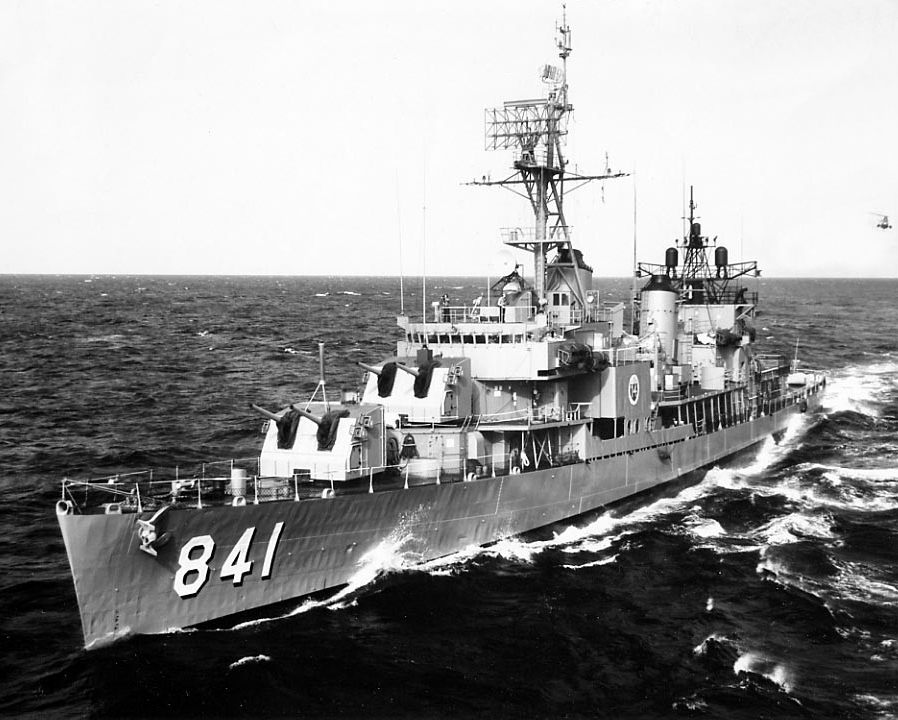
- USS Noa underway on 1 April 1965

History

United States
- Name: Noa
- Namesake: Loveman Noa
- Builder: Bath Iron Works
- Laid down: 26 March 1945
- Launched: 30 July 1945
- Commissioned: 2 November 1945
- Decommissioned: 31 October 1973
- Stricken: 2 June 1975
- Identification: Callsign: NBBS; Hull number: DD-841
- Motto: In Medias Res; (Into the Middle of Things)
- Fate: Loaned to Spain, 31 October 1973
- Notes: Sold to Spain, 17 May 1978
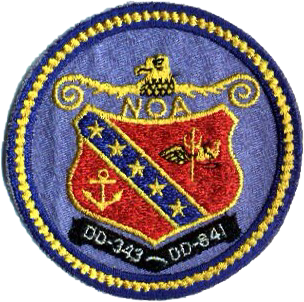
- Badge

Spain
- Name: Blas de Lezo
- Namesake: Blas de Lezo
- Acquired: 31 October 1973
- Identification: Hull number: D-65
- Fate: Scrapped, 1991

General characteristics
- Class & type: Gearing-class destroyer; Churruca-class destroyer
- Displacement: 3,460 long tons (3,516 t) full
- Length: 390 ft 6 in (119.02 m)
- Beam: 40 ft 10 in (12.45 m)
- Draft: 14 ft 4 in (4.37 m)
- Propulsion: Geared turbines, 2 shafts, 60,000 shp (45 MW)
- Speed: 35 knots (65 km/h; 40 mph)
- Range: 4,500 nmi (8,300 km) at 20 kn (37 km/h; 23 mph)
- Complement: 336
- Armament: 6 × 5"/38 caliber guns; 12 × 40 mm AA guns; 11 × 20 mm AA guns; 10 × 21-inch (533 mm) torpedo tubes; 6 × depth charge projectors; 2 × depth charge tracks

USS Noa (DD-841) was a Gearing-class destroyer of the United States Navy, the second U.S. Navy ship named for Midshipman Loveman Noa (1878–1901). She was in commission in the U.S. Navy from 1945 to 1973, serving during the Cold War in the Atlantic Ocean, Caribbean, Mediterranean, Middle East, and Indian Ocean and off the Korean Peninsula. In 1962 she recovered Project Mercury astronaut John H. Glenn, Jr. and his Friendship 7 spacecraft after Glenn completed the first orbital spaceflight by an American. She also operated off South Vietnam in 1969 during the Vietnam War.

After the conclusion of Noa′s U.S. Navy career, she served in the Spanish Navy as the Churruca-class destroyer SPS Blas de Lezo (D65) from 1973 to 1991.

== Construction and commissioning ==
Noa was laid down by the Bath Iron Works at Bath, Maine, on 26 March 1945. She was launched on 30 July 1945, sponsored by Mrs. James Cary Jones, Jr., wife of Rear Admiral James Cary Jones, Jr., USN, and was commissioned on 2 November 1945.

== Service history ==
=== United States Navy ===
==== 1945–1960 ====
After shakedown at Guantanamo Bay, Cuba, Noa departed her homeport of Norfolk, Virginia for her first Mediterranean deployment. She called at Gibraltar, Nice, Naples, Malta, Venice, Piraeus, and Lisbon. After participating in fleet maneuvers in the South Atlantic in early 1947, Noa returned to the United States. For the next two years she exercised in type training, underwent overhaul, and acted as school training ship for the Fleet Sonar School in Key West, Florida.

Noa served as rescue destroyer for the aircraft carrier Mindoro (CVE-120) during June and July 1949. From September 1949 through January 1951, she engaged in extended antisubmarine warfare training in a permanent ASW hunter-killer group as a unit of Destroyer Squadron Eight (DesRon 8). She also made a second Mediterranean deployment during this period. In early 1951 she participated in Convex II, a large scale convoy escort exercise, after which she called at Baltimore, Maryland. The next two years were devoted to upkeep and operational training along the East coast.

In August 1953, Noa departed from Norfolk on a 42,000 nautical miles (78,000 km; 48,000 mi) around-the-world cruise. She arrived Sasebo, Japan on 3 October and spent four months operating in the Sea of Japan with Task Force 77. Here she participated in operational readiness exercises while maintaining truce patrol off the Korean coast.

In November 1953, Noa operated in Japanese waters as part of a hunter-killer group. She patrolled the Korean coast together with the Cone (DD-866) in late November and early December. From then until her return to the United States in April 1954, Noa engaged in underway training. Upon her return to Norfolk, she was reassigned to hunter-killer duty in the Atlantic Ocean.

On 7 September 1954, Noa left Norfolk to participate in a joint NATO antisubmarine warfare exercise named "Black Jack". After visiting Derry, Northern Ireland, and ports in the Mediterranean, she was due to return to Norfolk on 12 November 1954. After leaving Gibraltar, the destroyer group was caught in hurricane force winds reaching 64 knots (119 km/h; 74 mph). Noa recorded rolls in excess of 50 degrees, Some of the destroyers sustained heavy damage in the storm. Noa and the other destroyers found safe haven at the port of Ponta Delgada on São Miguel Island in the Azores. The destroyer group, along with the aircraft carrier Valley Forge (CV-45), arrived at Norfolk one day late, on 13 November 1954. After returning, Noa reported to the Philadelphia Naval Shipyard at Philadelphia for an overhaul.

During the overhaul in the summer of 1955, Noa was outfitted with experimental sonar equipment that she tested in the Key West area. She departed Norfolk Naval Shipyard in February 1956 for her third Mediterranean deployment. Upon return to homeport the following summer, she trained in the eastern Atlantic. In the spring 1957 she steamed to the Caribbean for Operation Springboard 1–57 and Desairdex 1–57.

After completion of a three-month overhaul at Norfolk Naval Shipyard in August 1957 she steamed for five weeks of refresher training at Guantanamo and for shore bombardment exercises at Culebra Island, Puerto Rico. In winter of 1957–8, Noa served as test ship for experimental radio equipment and in spring 1958 she was again taking part in Springboard exercises in the Caribbean.

March 1957 saw Noa as a participant in Lantphibex 1–58, an exercise designed to test the latest amphibious warfare concepts. During the summer of 1958, Noa took part in 6th Fleet operations during the Lebanon crisis. After a short tour in the Persian Gulf she returned to Norfolk and joined the 2nd Fleet for Lantphibex 2–58.

In February 1959, Noa was again deployed to the Mediterranean. She participated in Sixth Fleet exercises through 1 April when she steamed for the Middle East via the Suez Canal. She called at Massawa, Ethiopia; Bombay, India; Bahrain; Saudi Arabia; Bandar Shahpur, Iran; and Aden. In late June, Noa rejoined the Sixth Fleet after having gone eighty-three days without replenishment. She returned to Norfolk on 1 September, and then transferred from Destroyer Squadron Six to Squadron Fourteen, with a new homeport at Mayport, Florida. Through spring 1960 she operated off the Atlantic Coast and in the Caribbean, She entered the Philadelphia Naval Shipyard on 25 May for a Fleet Rehabilitation and Modernization (FRAM), and she received the latest in antisubmarine warfare (ASW) equipment.

==== 1961–1973 ====
Noa completed her FRAM I overhaul on 2 May 1961, and she rejoined the Atlantic Fleet. After a four-week ready-for-sea period and ASROC qualification trials, she reported to Fleet Training Command, Guantanamo, for six weeks refresher training. Noa returned to Mayport on 23 July for a two-week destroyer-tender period alongside the Yellowstone (AD-27).

Training followed, and Noa steamed for the United Kingdom, for combined exercises in the Eastern Atlantic with the Royal Navy. She arrived at Portsmouth, England on 6 November, and also called at Belfast and Dublin before standing in to homeport on 20 December. After leave and upkeep, Noa resumed ASW training on 29 January 1962 in the western Atlantic.

Noa returned to Mayport on 6 February for modifications to her boat davits and briefings in preparation for the recovery of both America's first astronaut to orbit the Earth and his spacecraft. Preparations completed, she steamed on 11 February for the Project Mercury recovery area in the southwestern Atlantic, she reported on station on 14 February as part of the 24-ship recovery task force.

After two reschedulings of the space flight, Noa put in at San Juan, Puerto Rico, for two days. She was underway on 19 February 1962 for the recovery station, located 200 nautical miles (370 km; 230 mi) west-northwest of San Juan. On 20 February, at precisely 14:40, five hours and 53 minutes after launch, Friendship 7 reentered the atmosphere with a loud sonic boom that was clearly audible aboard Noa. She sighted and recovered Lieutenant Colonel John H. Glenn, Jr., USMC, Project Mercury astronaut, after he had completed three orbits of the Earth and splashed down 3 nautical miles (5.6 km; 3.5 mi) from the destroyer. Enthusiastic crewmen used white paint to draw circles around Glenn's footsteps when he stepped onto the ship's deck. Col. Glenn remained aboard Noa for three hours before a helicopter transferred him to the Randolph (CV-15), the primary recovery ship.

Upon completion of recovery operations, Noa returned to Mayport for ASW operations with Task Group Alpha until on 31 May. Noa then conducted type training and midshipmen cruises from her home port between Mediterranean operational deployments and upkeep. She steamed for the Mediterranean on 3 August 1962 for a seven-month tour with the Sixth Fleet and on 8 February 1964 saw her stand out of Mayport for another six-month Mediterranean deployment.

Her regularly scheduled overhaul took place at Charlestown from September 1964 through January 1965, followed by a Mediterranean deployment from mid-May through 1 September. In early October 1965, Noa steamed from Mayport for the Gemini VI recovery off the west coast of Africa. The flight was cancelled after the Agena-B rocket designed to launch a docking vehicle failed to achieve an orbital insertion.

Noa then participated in training and Atlantic Fleet exercises, including "High Time", an amphibious exercise in the Caribbean from late January through early March 1966. She also served as a unit of the Gemini 8 recovery forces 14–17 March 1966. Her April–October deployment to the Mediterranean was followed by leave, upkeep and Lantflex (28 November – 15 December).

In January 1967, Noa received two QH-50 DASH drone antisubmarine helicopters. She then served as school ship for the Fleet Sonar School at Key West (28 January – 11 February). "Operation Springboard" took her to the Caribbean 3–11 March and she steamed in Mediterranean waters June through November.

Noa stood out of Mayport on 5 January 1968 to conduct a solemn mission – the burial at sea of George H. Flynt, YN1 (Ret.). Flynt's last wish was that his remains be consigned to the deep.

Noa underwent regular availability and overhaul at Charleston commencing 8 January 1968. Work was completed 17 June and the destroyer was in Mayport on 25 June. Because of excessive vibration in her starboard shaft, Noa returned to drydock at Charleston on 8 July for one week. She steamed for Guantanamo for refresher training after which she returned to Mayport on 11 September. Homeported once again the destroyer conducted maintenance and training and began preparation for deployment to the Pacific.

During October she was in restricted availability at Jacksonville, Florida, for boiler repairs. She rode out Hurricane Gladys on 19 October and then spent the rest of the year in training and in preparation for her deployment to the Western Pacific in 1969.

==== 1969–1973 ====
In 1969 Noa served off the coast of South Vietnam during the Vietnam War, operating within 12 nautical miles (22 km; 14 mi) of the coast on at least two occasions in April and May 1969

In May 1972, Noa went to Guantanamo Bay for training. The ship was scheduled for overhaul and needed work done before she could again be deployed. From June to September 1972, Noa underwent overhaul at Naval Station Jacksonville. Repairs were made to the outer and inner hull and lagging was replaced throughout the ship.

Noa returned to Guantanamo Bay in November, 1972 for refresher training. She left Mayport for her last deployment as an American ship in January 1973, headed for the Middle East. Her deployment was a second one to the Middle East Force in the Indian Ocean and Persian Gulf. Because the Suez Canal was still closed because of mines from the Six-Day War, Noa went to the Indian Ocean via the Cape of Good Hope. She transited via Port of Spain, Trinidad; Recife, Brazil; Luanda, Angola;, Laurenco Marques (now Maputo), Mozambique and arrived in Port Louis, Mauritius. During the next months she operated in the Indian Ocean, Red Sea, and Persian Gulf, visiting Diego Garcia; the Chagos Archipelago; Diego Suarez (now Antsiranana), Madagascar; Victoria in the Seychelles; Djibouti; Mombasa, Kenya; Massawa (then in Ethiopia); and Bandar Abbas, Iran. Shah Mohammad Reza Pahlavi visited her while she was at Bandar Abbas. Later port visits included Dubai in the United Arab Emirates, where Emir Rashid bin Saeed Al Maktoum called upon the commanding officer and toured the ship. Noa's Landing Party Team won plaudits from Commander, Middle East Force for their preparation for and survey of Sir Abu Nu Air. During a mid-deployment visit to Bahrain, the ship underwent upkeep and restocking and enjoyed a visit by several wives of crewmen. She returned to Mayport in June 1973 after being relieved at Mombasa.

Noa returned via the same route she used for her journey to the Middle East. She participated in bilateral operations with the Brazilian Navy while in Brazilian waters.

Noa was decommissioned on 31 October 1973. She was struck from the U.S. Naval Vessel Register on 2 June 1975.

=== Spanish Navy ===
The United States loaned the ship to the Spanish Navy in 1973 and sold her outright to Spain on 17 May 1978. She served in the Spanish Navy as SPS Blas de Lezo (D65), named after Admiral Blas de Lezo y Olavarrieta (1689–1741). Blas de Lezo was stricken and scrapped in 1991.
