= Clock (disambiguation) =

A clock is an instrument for measuring time.

Clock, CLOCK, or Clocks may also refer to:

== Music ==
- Clock (American band), a band featuring Vivian Campbell and P.J. Smith
- Clock (British group), an English band primarily led by Stu Allan
- Clocks (American band), a Wichita new wave/pop rock band
- Clocks (British band), a London musical group formed in 2000
- Symphony No. 101 (Haydn) or "The Clock"

=== Songs ===
- "Clocks" (song), a 2002 song by Coldplay
- "Clock", a 1997 song by Coal Chamber from Coal Chamber
- "Clock", a 1980 song by The Danse Society
- "Clock", a song by Velocity Girl
- "Clocks", a 1974 song by Paul Brett

== Science ==
- Clock (constellation), also known as Horologium
- CLOCK (Circadian Locomotor Output Cycles Kaput), a gene related to circadian rhythms
- Clock, the spherical seed head of a mature dandelion

== Technology ==
- Clock generator, an electronic oscillator that produces a clock signal for use in synchronizing a circuit's operation.
- Clock (cryptography), a method to facilitate decrypting German Enigma ciphers
- Clock (Apple), a bundled iPhone app
- Windows Clock, a bundled Microsoft Windows app
- Clock, a page replacement algorithm

== Other uses ==
- Clock (film), a 2023 science-fiction horror film
- Clock (restaurant), a Swedish hamburger restaurant chain
- Clock, a character from the fourth season of Battle for Dream Island, an animated web series
- Clock, an ornamental design on the ankle or side of a sock
- Clock Patience, a card game

== See also ==
- The Clock (disambiguation)
- The Clocks, a work of detective fiction by Agatha Christie
- CLOCKSS, a closed system using LOCKSS technology
- Grandfather clock (disambiguation)
- Clog (disambiguation)
- Cloqué, a cloth
