= Royal Marriage =

Solitaire card game

- A patience or solitaire game
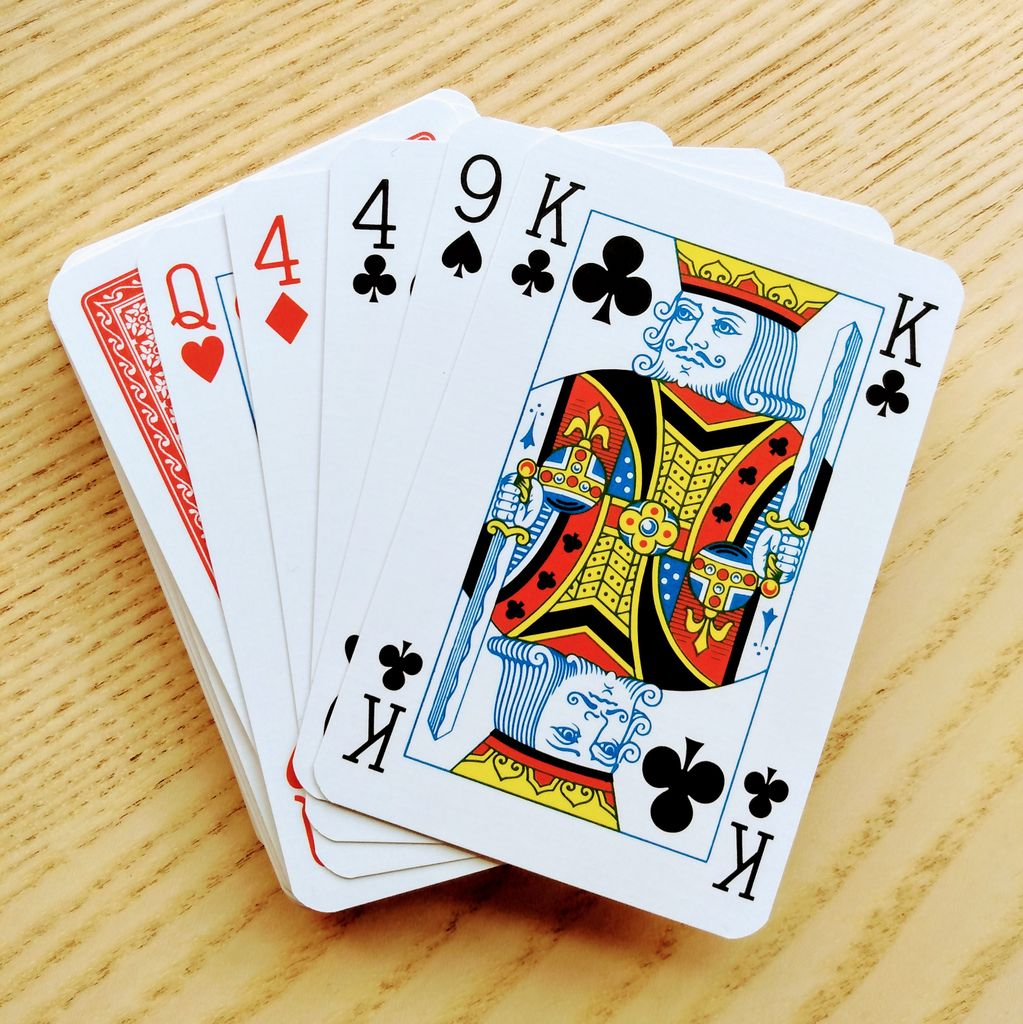
- The game played as a single stack of cards; a splayed hand of cards on top of a draw pile
- Alternative names: Betrothal
- Family: Non-Builder
- Deck: Single 52-card

Royal Marriage is a patience or solitaire game using a deck of 52 playing cards. It is an eliminator game in the style of the solitaire game Accordion. The game is so called because the player seems to remove anything that comes between the Queen and the King of the same suit for them to "marry." It also goes under the name Royal Wedding or Matrimony.

== History ==
First recorded by Hoffmann (1892), Royal Marriage is subsequently described by many others up to the present, include Morehead & Mott-Smith (1949, 2001) and Parlett (1979).

== Rules ==
The Queen of the chosen suit (traditionally the Queen of Hearts) is placed immediately on the table face-up while her corresponding King is placed face-down. The remaining fifty cards are shuffled and placed on the top of the King to form the stock. Cards are dealt from the stock one at a time to the right of the Queen. If a pair of cards with either the same rank or suit are separated by one or two cards, the in-between cards may be discarded. This may result in new opportunities to discard additional cards.

Strategy revolves around decisions of whether to discard cards or not. It may be advantageous to retain as many cards of the Queen's suit as possible, as these may be easily eliminated by the King or Queen at any tie, but may be helpful in eliminating other cards.

The game is won when the King and Queen are brought together -- that is, when only one or two cards remain in between them, which can then be discarded.

== Variations ==
Royal Marriage is possible to play in-hand, rather than on a surface such as a table. In this case, the deck is held face-down in one hand, with the King being uppermost face-down card and the Queen being held face-up above it. Cards are played from the bottom of the deck onto the Queen, and fanned out to show all cards that could possibly affect play.

Alternatively, the Queen can be played on one end of a surface, and all cards dealt out at the beginning to the Queen's right, ending with the King. This allows for an additional measure of strategy: being able to view the entire sequence of cards allows the player to choose which cards to discard and in what order to ensure a win.

Push-Pin is a variant of Royal Marriage that uses two decks.

== See also ==
- List of patiences and solitaires
- Glossary of patience and solitaire terms

== Literature ==
- Professor Hoffmann [Angelo Lewis] (1892). The Illustrated Book of Patience Games. London: Routledge.
- Morehead, Albert and Geoffrey Mott-Smith (1949). The Complete Book of Solitaire and Patience. New York: Longmans.
- Morehead, Albert and Geoffrey Mott-Smith (2001). The Complete Book of Solitaire and Patience. Foulsham, Slough. ISBN 0-572-02654-4
- Parlett, David (1979). The Penguin Book of Patience, Penguin, London. {ISBN 0-7139-1193-X
