= Accordion (disambiguation) =

An accordion is part of a family of musical instruments.

Accordion may also refer to:

- Any object with features resembling an accordion or its bellows
- Accordion cut, a technique in butchery similar to butterflying
- Accordion (GUI), a graphical user interface widget displaying a list where individual members of the list can be expanded or collapsed
- Accordion (film), a 1934 Soviet musical film
- Accordion (solitaire), a solitaire card game
- "Accordion" (Madvillain song)
- Accordion (company), an American consulting company

== See also ==
- Accordion effect, in physics
- The Accordionist, a 1911 painting by Pablo Picasso
