= Quadrille (patience) =

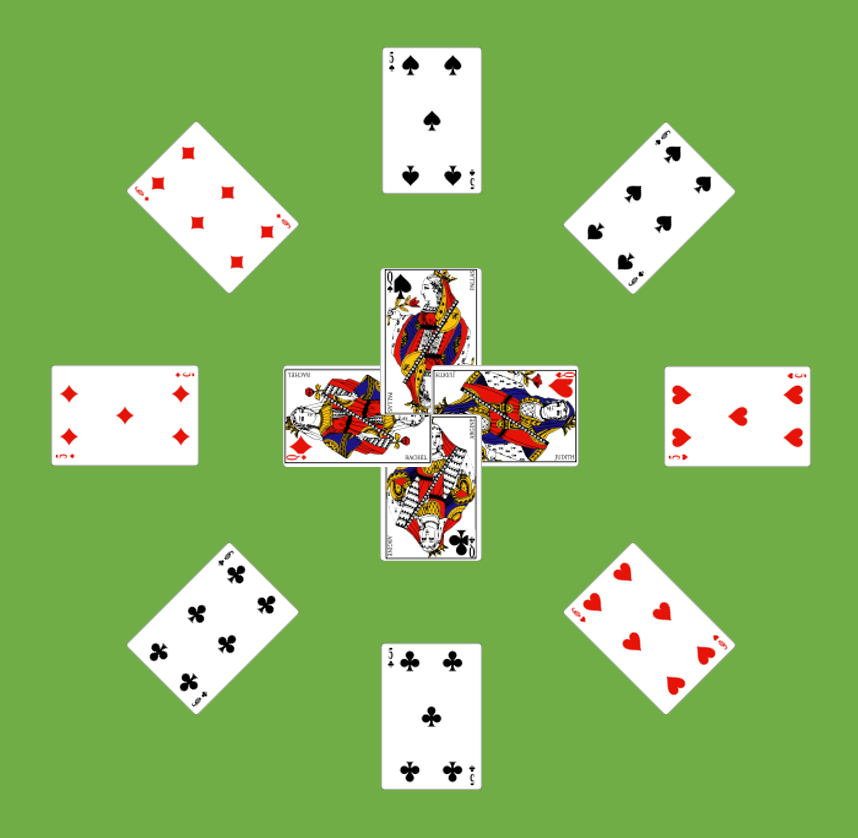
Captive Queens - initial layout

Quadrille is the name of two loosely related card games of the Patience or solitaire type which are often confused. Both use a pack of 52 playing cards. The earlier one was also known as La Française ("the Frenchwoman") or Royal Quadrille, the slightly later one as Captive Queens. The name is derived from the desired outcome of the earlier game in which the four Kings and Queens are arranged in a square formation as in the European dance of quadrille that was fashionable in the 18th and 19th centuries.

== History ==
In 1890, Mary Whitmore Jones published rules for a game called Quadrille Patience in which cards were built in broken ascending sequence on Aces and Deuces, laid out in a square, finishing with the Kings and Queens side-by-side in pairs. She notes that the game is also called La Française Patience and was known to have been played in France before 1790. In 1908, Hapgood calls the same game as The Royal Quadrille and affirms that it was played in France during the days of the First Empire.

Meanwhile, in 1892, Professor Hoffmann described a different game called Quadrille in which the cards were built up in ascending sequence on Sixes and descending sequence on Fives, all laid out in a star shape. The Queens were removed from the pack at the outset and placed decoratively within the star. This version subsequently acquired the name Captive Queens. (Note: Captive Queens as an alternative name first appears in Coops (1939) and is then picked up by Morehead & Mott-Smith (1950) and Moyse (1950).) In this game the name describes the way the Queens are enclosed within the star formed by the foundations. Alluding to the name, Quadrille, but describing the rules for the later game, Parlett calls it as "a pleasant little pictorial which may be said to represent the dance of the cardboard court." The wagon-wheel tableau looks like a quadrille dance from 18th-19th century Europe. (Note: Actually it doesn't since quadrille was a square dance. It is the earlier form that resembles the dance formation of quadrille.)

== Rules ==
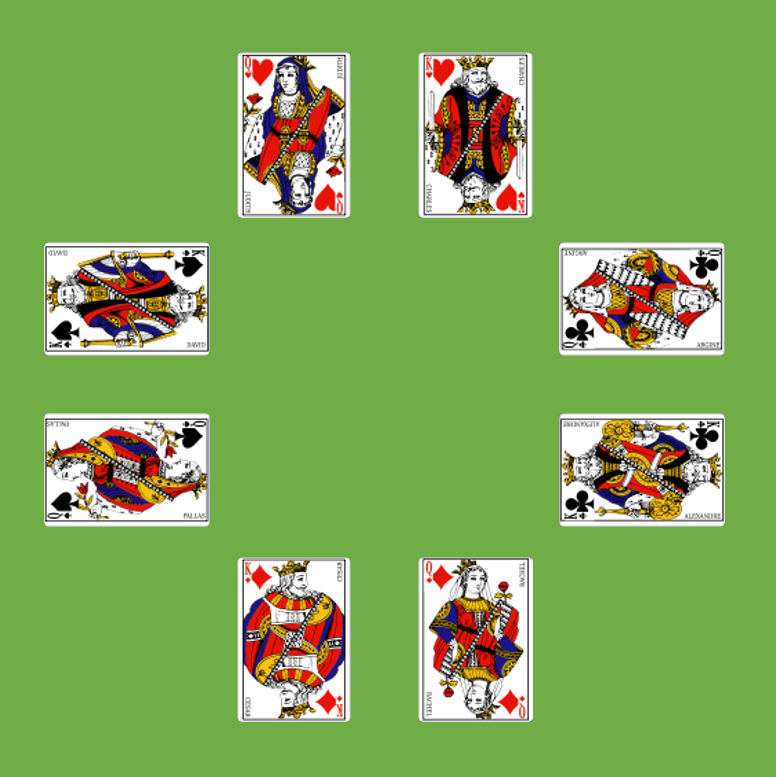
Royal Quadrille - result

Both games are called Quadrille; alternative titles have been used to distinguish them.

=== Royal quadrille or la Française ===
One pack is used, which is shuffled well and then dealt one-by-one to a rubbish heap. As Aces and Deuces appear, they are played to eight foundations arranged in the form of a quadrille (see illustration), with Hearts at the top, Diamonds at the bottom, Spades to the left and Clubs to the right. In each pair the Deuce is on the right. The foundations are built up in suit sequence by alternating numbers: the odd numbers on the Ace of the same suit and the even numbers likewise on the Deuce of the same suit as follows:

A	3	5	7	9	J	K
D	4	6	8	10	Q

The rubbish heap may be turned twice. If the patience succeeds, the Kings and Queens will form pairs as in the dance of Quadrille.

=== Captive queens ===
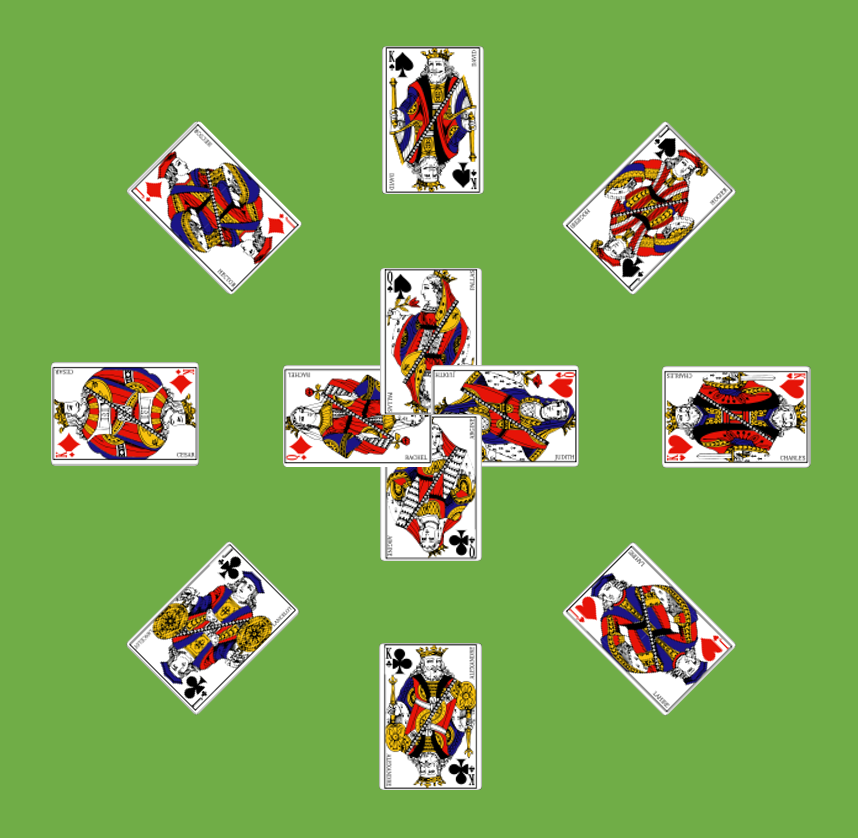
Captive Queens - result

There are two ways of setting up the game:

- The Queens are laid in the middle of the table and the Fives and Sixes laid down in a radial pattern around them as shown to form the foundations.
- The Queens, Fives and Sixes are shuffled as part of the deck and laid out, as they appear, on the tableau but in no set order.

Either way, the role of the Queens is purely decorative and plays no functional role in the game. The aim is to build the Sixes upwards in the same suit as far as the Jacks, and the Fives downwards as far as the Kings (via the Aces) as follows:

5	4	3	2	A	K
6	7	8	9	10	J

To play, cards are turned from the stock and built if possible or discarded if not possible into a waste pile, face up. The top card of the waste pile is always available. Once the stock runs out, the cards are gathered from the waste pile and become the new stock from which cards are to be dealt. Three re-deals are permitted.

The game is won when all the cards are in the foundations with the court cards (Kings and Jacks) at the top of each foundation, as shown on the right.

According to Arnold a successful game takes about 6 minutes to complete and the odds are 2 in 5. Morehead & Mott-Smith give the playing time as 4 minutes and odds of 1 in 2. (Note: In neither case are the base cards pre-positioned, which would clearly improve the odds.)

== Variants ==
Contradance (cotillion) works in the same way as Captive Queens, but uses two decks.

== Related games ==
Other games in which building takes place in alternate sequences like Royal Quadrille include the two-pack, reserved builders of Odd and Even and Royal Cotillion.

Games in which each suit is built on two foundations – up on one and down on the other – as in Captive Queens, include the twin-pack, reserved builder of Patriarchs and the half-open builder of Sixes and Sevens.

All these loosely related games offer greater scope for decision making.

== Bibliography ==
- Arnold, Peter (2011). Card Games for One. 2nd edn. London: Chambers.
- Dalton, Basil (1948,64,67). The Complete Patience Book. John Baker. 234 pp.
- Hapgood, George (1908). Solitaire and Patience. Penn.
- Hoffmann, Professor [Angelo Lewis] (1892). The Illustrated Book of Patience Games. London: Routledge.
- Morehead, A. H. & G. Mott-Smith (1949). The Complete Book of Solitaire and Patience Games. NY: Longmans.
- Moyse, Alphonse (1950). 150 Ways to Play Solitaire. Cincinnati: USPCC. IA
- Parlett, David (1979). The Penguin Book of Patience. London: Penguin. ISBN 0-7139-1193-X.
- Whitmore Jones, Mary (1890). Games of Patience for One or More Players. 2nd Series. L: L. Upcott Gill. NY: Scribner's.

== See also ==
- Cotillion (Contradance)
- Royal Cotillion
- Odd and Even
- Patriarchs
- List of patiences and card solitaires
- Glossary of patience and solitaire terms
