= Big Ben (card game) =

Solitaire card game

- A Patience or card solitaire
- Alternative names: The Clock, Clock, Father Time, Grandfather's Clock
- Type: Simple packer
- Deck: Single 52-card
- Playing time: 20 min
- Odds of winning: 1 in 2

Big Ben is a patience or card solitaire which uses two decks of playing cards mixed together. It is named after Big Ben, the nickname of the clock tower of the Palace of Westminster in London.

== Names ==
Big Ben is also known in the literature as The Clock, Clock, L'Horloge, Grandfather's Clock Patience, Grandfather's Clock and Father Time. It should not be confused with the one pack games of Clock, the shuttling game, The Clock as a variant of Travellers or Clock as a relative of Block Eleven.

== Rules ==
Before the start of the game, the following cards are separated from the decks: 2♣, 3♥, 4♠, 5♦, 6♣, 7♥, 8♠, 9♦, 10♣, J♥, Q♠, K♦. These cards are used to form a circle arranged like numbers on a clock face with the 2♣ on the "9 o' clock" position, the 5♦ at the "12 o' clock" position, and the K♦ at the "8 o' clock." This will be the foundations, or the "inner circle" (otherwise known as the "clock").

Twelve piles of three cards are then dealt around the inner circle. These piles form the tableau, or the "outer circle." The top cards of the outer circle are available for play to the inner circle or around the outer circle. Building on the outer circle is down by suit, while the foundations in the inner circle are built up by suit until the last card corresponds to its position on the clock (i.e. the Q♠ should be built up to 7♠, for instance). Building is also continuous, with Aces placed over Kings in the inner circle and vice versa in the outer circle.

The minimum number of cards in each pile in the outer circle is three. A pile containing less than three cards is said to have gaps; an empty pile has three "gaps," a pile having one card has two "gaps," and a pile with two cards has one "gap." As cards are built, "gaps" are formed and the only way these are "filled" is by dealing cards from the stock. Building on a pile having cards less than three is like "filling a gap" from the tableau and is therefore not allowed.

It is the player's discretion when to fill the "gaps," but when the player decides to do so, one has to fill all "gaps," i. e. replenish all piles with less than three cards so each of them contains three cards once again. For example, two piles are empty, one pile has one card left, and two piles have two cards left. So the player has to fill a total of 10 gaps. He does this by dealing cards one card per pile at a time clockwise starting from the pile above the "12 o' clock" foundation. No building is done until this process is complete. The player can do this as long as there are "gaps."

Sometimes, the player cannot make any moves even when all piles contain three cards each. So the player can deal cards from the stock one at a time. Cards that cannot be built either onto the inner or outer circles are placed on the wastepile (as a suggestion, one can place the waste pile at the center of the inner circle for convenience). Again, cards at the wastepile cannot be used to fill "gaps." But once the stock is exhausted, there are no re-deals; the game ends sooner after this or later.

The game is won when all foundations show cards corresponding to their positions in the clock (J♠ on "11 o' clock," Q♦ on "12 o' clock," A♣ on "1 o' clock," and so on.)

== Related games ==
Big Ben is a large-scale, two-deck version of Grandfather's Clock.

== See also ==
- List of patiences and solitaires
- Glossary of patience and solitaire terms

== Bibliography ==
- Morehead, A. H. and Geoffrey Mott-Smith (1950). The Complete Book of Patience. London: Faber & Faber.
