= Accordion (card game) =

Patience card game

- Solitaire game
- Alternative names: The Idle Year, Tower of Babel, Methuselah, Leapfrog
- Family: Non-builder
- Deck: Single 52-card
- Playing time: 5 min
- Odds of winning: 1 in 100

Accordion is a solitaire card game using a single deck of standard playing cards. It is so named because it looks like accordion pleats, which have to be ironed out. The object is to compress the entire deck into one pile like an accordion.

== Name ==
The name Accordion comes from the appearance of the layout as it alternately grows and shrinks during play. It was originally called The Idle Year and alternative names occasionally encountered include Tower of Babel and Methuselah. It is called The Idle Year because "with a well-shuffled pack, it will require about that length of time to accomplish it." Presumably the same logic applies to Methuselah. It may be the same game that the Italians call Qui Sace (Who Knows?).

== History ==
Rules for The Idle Year are published by William Brisbane Dick in 1883 and by "Tarbart" in 1905. Dick's rules are strict: a packet must be moved if possible and, if there is a choice, it must be moved to its nearest neighbour. Tarbart's rules are lax: a packet that can be moved need not be and judgment should be exercised as to whether to play it or not.

The game recorded by Wood & Goddard in 1940 as Tower of Babel allows a player the choice of whether to play an available packet to its left-hand neighbour or to the third packet to the left, but does not say if a player can continue dealing without moving.

The name Accordion appears in the 1950s, Culbertson and Goren allowing a further deal before deciding whether or not to move a packet. Parlett equates Accordion with Idle Year, Methuselah and Tower of Babel, but insists that a packet must be played if it can, leaving any choice between the 1st and 3rd packets to the left to the player. The game has been included in numerous compendia in recent decades, usually under the name Accordion.

== Rules ==
The cards from the entire deck are spread out in a single line.

A pile can be moved on top of another pile immediately to its left or moved three piles to its left if the top cards of each pile have the same suit or rank. Gaps left behind are filled by moving piles to the left. The player is not required to make a particular move if they prefer not to.

Here is an example:

Here, either 6♠ or 5♥ can be placed over the 5♠. These are the only allowable moves.

The game is won when all cards are compressed into one pile.

Originally, cards were laid out one at a time, and it was only allowed to place a new card when no moves were available. As the game is exceedingly difficult to win that way, the rules listed above were adopted.

== Strategy ==
The odds of winning have been estimated as being around one in a hundred. Given how difficult it is to achieve this when cards are dealt one at a time, Alfred Sheinwold suggests in his book 101 Best Family Card Games (ISBN 0-8069-8635-2) that it may be considered a win when there are five piles or fewer at the end of the game.

The best chance of a successful game comes by identifying 4 cards with the same rank that are close and near the end of the layout at the start of the game, and to try to move these four "sweeper" cards together in a group towards the front of the layout, not covering them with other cards until the end of the game.

== Variants ==
Other eliminator games in the style of Accordion appeared a decade later in the 1890s:

The Queen and Her Lad is first recorded by Mary Whitmore Jones in the 3rd series of her Games of Patience (1892). One pack is used. The Q♥ is laid down as the "commencing card". The J♥ is put at the bottom of the stock which is played singly to the right of the Q♥. One or two cards may be discarded if they lie between two others of the same suit or rank; however, if two are "pushed out" they must also be of the same suit or rank as one another. If, in adjusting the line, three or four pairs come together in succession between two cards of the same rank or suit, all the intervening cards may be pushed out. The patience is out if the "Queen and Her Lad" can be united at the end, but this is described as "very difficult". (Note: In 19th century style, she calls it 'The Queen and Her Lad Patience'.)

Royal Marriage where the aim is to reduce the entire deck to King and Queen of the same suit, these being placed at the start and end of the layout at the beginning of the game. (Note: First recorded by Hoffmann (1892) and subsequently by many others include Morehead & Mott-Smith (1949, 2001) and Parlett (1979).)

Nidgi Novgorod first appeared in the 1904 Standard Hoyle. Played with a single deck, "no skill is required". Two cards of equal rank are placed at the top and bottom of the shuffled pack and the top 4 cards dealt to the table in a row. If the outer cards are of the same rank or suit, the inner cards are discarded, otherwise the next card is added to the row. Every time there is a series of four cards in which the outer ones match in rank and suit, the two cards in between are discarded. If successful, the player's last move will be to discard the two cards between the two originally chosen as the top and bottom of the pack. The game was sometimes called Russian Solitaire, not to be confused with the modern variant of Yukon or the old English, two-pack game of Russian Patience.

== See also ==
- Royal Marriage
- List of patience games
- Glossary of patience terms

== Literature ==
- _ (1904). The Standard Hoyle. New York: Excelsior.
- Bernard, April (2012). Miss Fuller: A Novel. Hanover, NH: Steerforth. ISBN 978-1-58642-195-3
- Culbertson, Ely (1957). Culbertson’s Card Games Complete, ed. Hubert Phillips. Argo.
- Dick, William Brisbane (1883). Dick's Games of Patience, Or, Solitaire with Cards. 44 games. NY: Dick & Fitzgerald.
- Goren, Charles Henry (1961). Goren’s Hoyle Encyclopedia of Games. NY: Greystone Press.
- Professor Hoffmann [Angelo Lewis] (1892). The Illustrated Book of Patience Games. London: Routledge.
- Morehead, Albert and Geoffrey Mott-Smith (1949). The Complete Book of Solitaire and Patience. New York: Longmans.
- Morehead, Albert and Geoffrey Mott-Smith (2001). The Complete Book of Solitaire and Patience. Foulsham, Slough. ISBN 0-572-02654-4
- Parlett, David (1979). The Penguin Book of Patience, Penguin, London. {ISBN 0-7139-1193-X
- "Tarbart" (1905). Games of Patience. 2nd edn. De La Rue.
- Whitmore Jones, Mary (1892). Games of Patience for One or More Players. 3rd Series. London: L. Upcott Gill.
- Wood, Clement and Gloria Goddard (1940). The Complete Book of Games. Garden City.
