= Decade (card game) =

Patience card game

- A Patience game
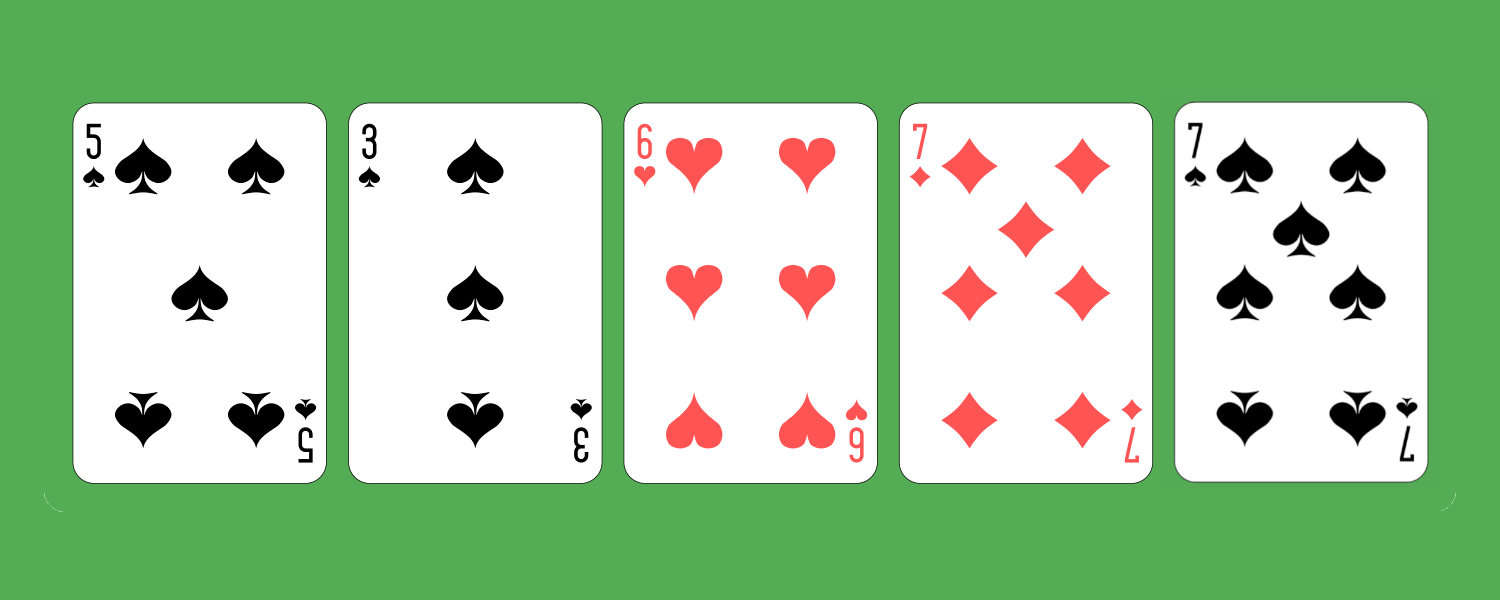
- A row of cards from the game. The 6♥, 7♦ and 7♠ sum to 20 and can be discarded.
- Origin: US
- Alternative names: Ten-Twenty-Thirty
- Family: Pocket, Closed non-builder
- Deck: Single 52-card
- Odds of winning: 1 in 50

Decade or Ten-Twenty-Thirty is a Patience game of the Simple Addition family played with a traditional 52-card deck. It is akin to another solitaire game called Accordion, but during game-play three adjacent cards totalling 10, 20, or 30 can be removed (face-cards count as 10).

== History ==
Decade is a relatively modern game of American origin, first appearing in 1949, but seldom since, perhaps a consequence of its low probability of success.

== Rules ==
Using a standard 52-card deck of playing cards (without jokers), three cards are drawn from the bottom of the deck and placed face-up in a line on the table laid out in the order they were drawn so the faces can be read.

Spot cards (cards from ace, deuce, etc. to ten) count their face value while face cards (jack, queen, and king) are valued at ten points. If the total of at least two consecutive cards in the line equals 10, 20 or 30, they are discarded. The cards are treated as if in a straight line, so cards coming from both the front and back of the line that value to ten, twenty, or thirty are not considered consecutive unless they occupy a physically adjacent position to the card. After this has been repeated until no more discards are possible, a card is drawn from the stock and placed face up on the extreme right of the line (or on top of the stack if playing on one hand), and checking for discards is resumed.

The game continues until all cards are dealt or discarded, or when no more sets can be collected. The object of the game is to have as few cards as possible at the end; the game is won when all cards are discarded.

== Variations ==
- Cards are placed in seven separate stacks; if all the cards in a stack are discarded the stack is eliminated and cards are no longer added to it. The game is won when all stacks have been eliminated.
- A maximum of three consecutive cards that total ten, twenty or thirty can be discarded (as opposed to at least two cards in the standard rules).
- Cards that total 5, 15, 25, or 35 can also be discarded. (Implemented as a variation of the game in Interplay's Solitaire Deluxe)
- The line is treated as a loop instead of a straight line. If the total of up to 3 three consecutive cards (or at least two consecutive cards, depending on the rule set one follows) in the stack which feature at least one card from the top of the stack equal 10, 20 or 30, they are discarded:

4 of hearts	8 of clubs	3 of diamonds	3 of spades	Jack of clubs	6 of spades

Because the stack is treated as a loop, and the cards selected use at least one card from the top of the stack discarding J♣, 6♠ and 4♥ as a set of three totaling 20 (10 + 6 + 4) would be valid.

== One-handed play ==
Like Accordion, Decade is traditionally played with the cards in a line, but due its minimal use of space can also be played in one hand. This is done by placing the deck face-down in the hand, and placing the line in a stack on top of the deck, with the discard pile face up on the bottom (as seen in the images below).

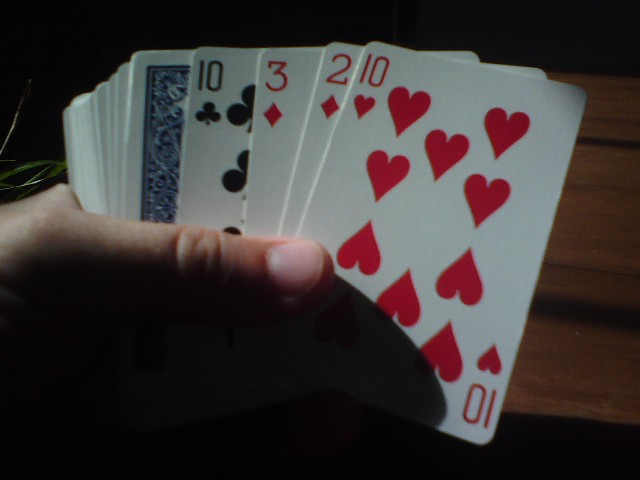

== See also ==
- Accordion
- List of patiences and solitaires
- Glossary of patience and solitaire terms

== Bibliography ==
- Liflander, Pamela (2002). The Little Book of Solitaire. Philadelphia, PA: Running Press. ISBN 0-7624-1381-6
- Morehead, A. H. & G. Mott-Smith (1949). The Complete Book of Solitaire and Patience Games. NY: Longmans.
