= Clock (card game) =

Solitaire card game

- A Patience game
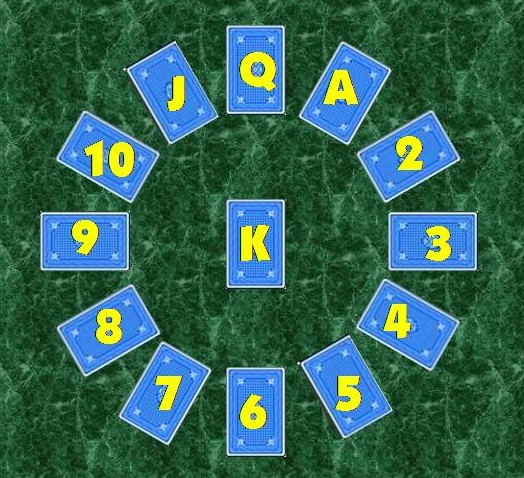
- Initial layout; numbers/letters represent the piles.
- Named variant: Watch
- Type: Non-Builder, Shuttler
- Deck: Single 52-card

Related games
- Four of a Kind, Hidden Cards, Travellers, Wandering Card

Clock or Sundial is a luck-based patience or solitaire card game with the cards laid out to represent the face of a clock. It is closely related to Travellers.

Clock is a purely mechanical process with no room for skill, and the chances of winning are exactly 1 in 13. It has a feature described by Parlett as 'shuttling' in which a card is placed at the bottom of a pile and the next card to be played comes off the top of the same pile.

== Names ==
This game was known in the 19th century as The Clock, (Note: See e.g. Cheney (1869), pp. 66–69.) but the name has since been shortened to Clock. (Note: See e.g. Moyse (1950), pp. 15–16.) It was a variation of Wandering Card, an old game of European origin. Some sources give alternative names as Hidden Cards, Four of a Kind and Travellers. However, Four of a Kind has a different layout and mechanism, (Note: See Foster (1897), p. 491.) whilst Hidden Cards and Travellers are also variations of Wandering Card with different layouts and shuttling procedures from Clock.

There are other unrelated patiences or solitaires also sometimes called Clock or The Clock:

- Big Ben
- Grandfather's Clock
- Clock, member of the Simple Addition or Totals family, related to Block Eleven

The game also was known as Clocktime.

== Rules ==
One deck of cards (minus jokers) is used. The deck is shuffled and twelve piles of four cards each are laid out, face down, in a circle. The remaining four cards are placed, also face down, in a pile in the center of the circle.

The twelve positions around the circle represent the 12-hour clock and the pile in the middle represents the hands.

Play starts by turning over the top card of the central pile. When a card is revealed, it is placed face up under the pile at the corresponding hour (i.e., Ace = 1 o'clock, 2 = 2 o'clock, etc. The Jack is 11 o'clock and the Queen is 12 o'clock) and the top card of the pile of that hour is turned over. If a King is revealed, it is placed face up under the central pile.

Play continues in this fashion and the game is won if all the cards (including four Kings) are revealed; turning up the fourth king means you will have completed the clock and won the game. The game is lost if the fourth King is turned up while any cards remain face down.

== Variations ==
In a variation of Clock commonly called Watch, players can continue the play when the fourth king appears, by replacing it with a still face-down card. The game ends when that fourth king reappears.

The Clock (sometimes also called "German Clock") is a stock and waste type of solitaire originally called "Die Uhr", and described in a German solitaire book by Rudolf Heinrich from 1976. This gives rules for very different game-play that depends on skill not to miss cards that can be played to the foundations.

== See also ==
- Big Ben
- The Clock (German Clock)
- Grandfather's Clock
- Travellers (Four of a Kind, Hidden Cards, Wandering Card)
- List of patiences and solitaires
- Glossary of patience and solitaire terms

== Bibliography ==
- Cheney, Mrs. E. D. (1869). Patience: A Series of Games with Cards. 2nd edn, with additions. Boston: Lee & Shepard. NY: Lee, Shepard & Dillingham.
- Foster, Robert Frederick (1897). Foster’s Complete Hoyle. 3rd edn. New York and London: Frederick. A. Stokes.
- Moyse, Alphonse Jr. (1950). 150 Ways to Play Solitaire. Cincinnati: USPCC. 128 pp.
- Parlett, David (1979). The Penguin Book of Patience, London: Penguin. ISBN 0-7139-1193-X
