= Baroness (card game) =

Solitaire card game

- A Patience game
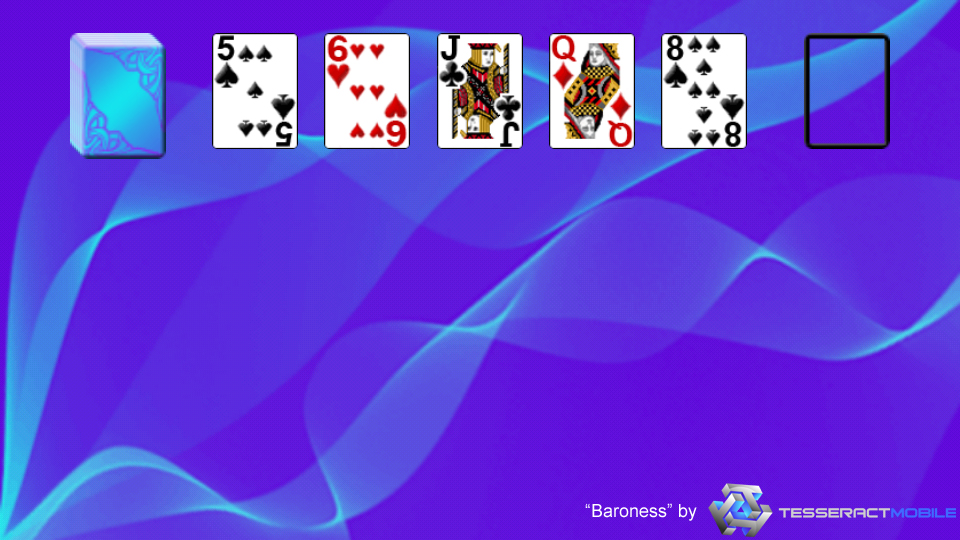
- Screenshot of Baroness
- Alternative names: Five Piles, Thirteens
- Type: Closed non-builder
- Family: Adding and pairing
- Deck: Single 52-card
- Playing time: 5 min
- Odds of winning: 1 in 5

Related games
- Eight Cards, Good Thirteen

Baroness is a patience or card solitaire that is played with a single deck of 52 playing cards. It is similar to other members of the Simple Addition family and is also distantly related to Aces Up.

== Name ==
The original name was The Baroness Patience, although the most common name since is just Baroness. It has also been occasionally referred to "boringly and not very descriptively" as Five Piles or Thirteens after two of its ludemes. Arnold describes Baroness as "a most pleasant name... maintaining a tradition in which patience games were often named after ladies of the aristocracy."

== History ==
The first author to publish its rules, Mary Whitmore Jones, says, in 1890, that it is a "very old Patience." Brock plagiarises the text verbatim in his 1909 work, but renames it The Baroness Solitaire. In these earliest accounts, the Kings are first discarded as they do not pair with any other card. In later accounts, the Kings are discarded singly. (Note: For example, see Morehead & Mott-Smith (2001), p. 77.) Baroness has continued to feature in games literature down to the present day.

== Rules ==
In the classic rules, the Kings are discarded at the outset; otherwise they are discarded singly during play. The following is based on Arnold (2011), except where noted:

Five cards are dealt in a row as the bases of the five piles in the tableau. The top cards of each pile are available for removal to the discard pile.

The aim is to discard all the cards by removing any Kings and pairs of available cards that total 13. In this game, spot cards are taken at face value, Jacks are worth 11, Queens 12, and Kings 13. So the following combinations of cards may be discarded:

- Queen and Ace
- Jack and 2
- 10 and 3
- 9 and 4
- 8 and 5
- 7 and 6
- Kings on their own.

When all available discards have been made, five fresh cards are dealt, one onto each pile in the tableau either filling a space or covering the existing card. The new top cards are available for play and, once again, any Kings or combinations totalling 13 are moved to the discard pile. When the top card of a pile is discarded, the card beneath becomes immediately available. Play continues in this way until there are only two cards left in hand; these are used as grace cards, (Note: This is Parlett's term.) being added to the end of the tableau, face up and side by side, and are available for play. (Note: The original rules do not state what happen to the last two cards; by implication they are played to the first two piles.)

The game is out when all cards have been discarded.

== Variations ==
Keller records several variations to increase the chances of winning:

- Six or seven piles are used.
- Available cards may be moved to any spaces in the tableau.
- Available cards may be paired with the card immediately beneath it.

== Closely related games ==
The name Thirteens also refers to a closely related game that plays similarly, but begins with a tableau of ten cards in two rows or non-overlapping columns of five each. Cards are replaced individually from the stock as they are played. (Note: First recorded by Hoffmann (1892) and also covered, for example, by Moyse (1950), Goren (1961) and Morehead & Mott-Smith (2001).)

== See also ==
- Thirteens
- List of patiences and solitaires
- Glossary of patience and solitaire terms

== Bibliography ==
- Arnold, Peter (2011). Card Games for One. 2nd edn. London: Chambers.
- Bonaventure, George A. (1931) Games of Solitaire. NY: Duffield & Green. 100 games. 199 pp.
- Coops, Helen L. (1939). 100 Games of Solitaire (as "Thirteens"). Whitman. 128 pp.
- Goren, Charles (1961). Goren's Hoyle Encyclopedia of Games. NY: Greystone.
- Moyse Jr, Alphonse (1950). 150 Ways to play Solitaire. USPCC. 128 pp.
- Morehead, Albert H. & Mott-Smith, Geoffrey (2001). The Complete Book of Solitaire & Patience Games (as "Five Piles"). Foulsham, Slough. ISBN 0-572-02654-4
- Parlett, David (1979). The Penguin Book of Patience. London: Penguin. ISBN 0-7139-1193-X
- Whitmore Jones, Mary (1890). Games of Patience for One or More Players. 2nd series. London: L. Upcott Gill. NY: Scribner's.
