= Capricieuse =

Card game

- A patience game
- Origin: England
- Alternative names: Capricious
- Type: Open packer
- Family: Bisley
- Deck: Double 52-card

Capricieuse is an old English patience played using two packs of playing cards. Some authors call it Capricious.

== History ==
The rules of La Capricieue were first published in 1892 in England by Professor Hoffmann, but did not appear in the US until 1939. Morehead & Mott-Smith adapted the name to Capricious, but David Parlett and Alphonse Moyse retain the original French name.

== Rules ==
The entire pack must be dealt into twelve piles of cards. Any arrangement will do, but for convenience, two rows of six piles each will be formed. During dealing, one ace and one king of each suit is removed, all of which will form the foundations. The aces are built up while the kings are built down, all by suit.

During the process of dealing the twelve piles, cards that can be built on a foundation must be built. Also, none of the twelve piles should be left out, i.e. when a card is immediately built on a foundation, the next card is dealt on the pile the previous card left.

No building is done during the process of dealing until all cards are dealt. Afterwards, the top cards of each pile are built on the foundations or on each other's piles. The cards on the piles are built on each other either up or down by suit. Building can go in both directions, but a king cannot be placed over an ace and vice versa. Only one card can be moved at a time, and any empty pile can be filled with any card.

After the player has made all the moves he can make, the piles are collected in the reverse order the piles are dealt and the process is repeated. This redeal can be done twice in the game.

The game is out when all cards end up in the foundations.

== Russian Patience ==
A possible ancestor of Capricieuse, Russian Patience, is first recorded by H.E. Heather in 1876. It is a twin-pack game in which cards are dealt to 8 successive overlapping rows of 12 cards each. After dealing the first row, any Kings or Aces are taken as foundation cards, along with any cards that may be built onto them, the Kings being built down in suit sequence and the Aces up likewises. Any spaces created are filled from the stock. In dealing to the succeeding rows only the outside cards are available as long as they are not yet covered. Outside cards are those in the top row and those in the perpendicular columns on the far left and right of the tableau. However, the top row is automatically blocked by the presence of a 13th card at the left hand end of the second row. Once the whole pack has been dealt out, the bottom cards of each column are available. Tableau cards may be packed in ascending or descending suit sequence and moved between columns as sequences. Vacancies may be filled with any available card. If the game chockers, the tableau cards are gathered up, shuffled and redealt as before. Two redeals are permitted.

== See also ==
- List of patiences and card solitaires
- Glossary of patience and solitaire terms

== Bibliography ==
- Coops, Helen L. (1939). 100 Games of Solitaire. Whitman.
- Heather, H. E. (1876). Cards and Card Tricks. London: The Bazaar Office.
- Professor Hoffmann [Angelo Lewis] (1892). The Illustrated Book of Patience Games. 2nd edn. London: Routledge.
- Morehead, Albert H. & Mott-Smith, Geoffrey (1950). The Complete Book of Solitaire & Patience Games. London: Faber & Faber.
- Moyse Jr, Alphonse. 150 Ways to play Solitaire. Cincinnati: USPC.
- Parlett, David. The Penguin Book of Patience. London: Penguin.
