= Odds and evens =

Odds and evens may refer to:

- Odds and evens (hand game), a two-player guessing game using fingers
- Odds and evens (patience), a solitaire variant of the card game Royal Cotillion
- Odds and Evens (film), a 1978 Italian action-comedy movie
- Parity (mathematics), the concept of odd and even integers

== See also ==
- Odd and Even, another solitaire card game
