= Grandfather clock (disambiguation) =

A grandfather clock is a type of freestanding, weight-driven clock, usually six to eight feet in height.

Grandfather clock may also refer to:

- "Grandfather Clock" (This Will Destroy You song), a song by This Will Destroy You, from their EP Young Mountain
- Grandfather's Clock, a card game based on solitaire
- "My Grandfather's Clock", a popular song first written in 1876
- The grandfather clock engine (1885), an early petrol engine

== See also ==
- Grandfather (disambiguation)
- Clock (disambiguation)
