= Contradance (card game) =

Solitaire card game

Contradance (also known as cotillion) is a solitaire card game which is played with two decks of playing cards. It is probably so called because when the game is won, it shows the king and the queen of each suit about to do a dance, the cotillion being a country dance from the 18th century.

It should not be confused with another solitaire game called Royal Cotillion.

== Rules ==
Before the game starts, all fives and sixes are separated from the shuffled decks and placed on the table. These sixteen cards are the foundations; the fives are built down to aces, then kings, while the sixes are built up to queens, all by suit.

The stock is dealt one at a time, and cards that cannot be built yet on the foundations are placed on a wastepile, the top card of which is available for play on the foundations. The predominant rule sets allow only one redeal. To do this, the unplayed cards on the wastepile are picked up and turned face down to make the new stock.

The game is won when all cards are built on the foundations.

== Variations ==
Contradance is a two-deck version of the single-deck game Captive Queens (Quadrille).

Closely related to Contradance is the solitaire game "sixes and sevens", which adds a nine card reserve in the shape of a 3x3 grid, and has foundations starting with 6s (building down) and 7s (building up). Games much like sixes and sevens include Odd and Even, Patriarchs, and Royal Cotillion.

== See also ==
- Quadrille (Captured Queens)
- Royal Cotillion
- Odd and Even
- Patriarchs
- List of solitaires
- Glossary of solitaire
