= Eight Cards =

Patience-Game with play cards

- A patience game
- Origin: Germany
- Type: Non-builder
- Family: Adding and pairing
- Deck: Single 52-card French pack

Related games
- Baroness, Good Thirteen

Eight Cards (German: Acht Karten) is a simple, German patience game for one player, that is played with a French pack of 52 cards.

== Rules ==
A single French pack of 52 cards is shuffled and placed in front of the player as a stock.

The top eight cards are picked up and placed on the table in the shape of a rectangle:

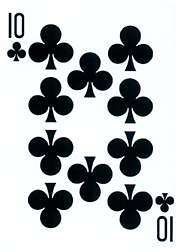

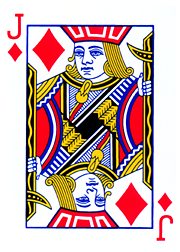

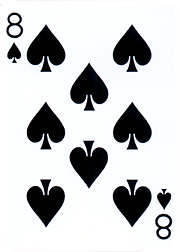

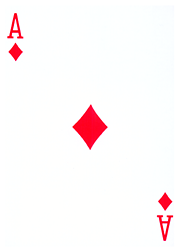

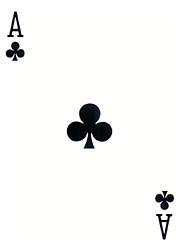

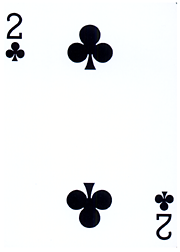

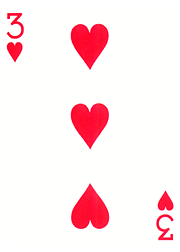

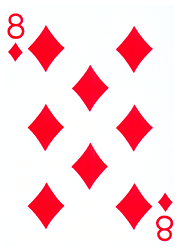

Now pairs of cards, irrespective of their suit, whose values add up to 11 points, are removed and placed to one side. The card values of the pip cards correspond to the face values; in addition the Ace is worth one, the Jack, Queen and King score 11 each. Individual cards that are worth 11 points are also removed. The resulting gaps are filled with fresh cards from the stock. Twice during the game the player is allowed to flip a ninth card to assist in getting the patience out.

If, despite the ninth card, no more pairs can be formed, the patience game has been lost. If the stock can be exhausted successfully the player has won.

== Variations ==
Eight Cards is similar to the patience game, Good Thirteen, where ten cards are laid out and pairs and individual cards worth 13 points are removed.

== See also ==
- Good Thirteen
- Baroness
- List of solitaires
- Glossary of solitaire
