= Patriarchs (card game) =

Solitaire card game

Patriarchs is a patience or card solitaire which is played with two packs of playing cards. It is similar in reserve layout to Odd and Even but with different rules of play.

== Rules ==
First, one king and one ace are removed from the deck and placed in two columns: one with all aces and the other with all kings. In between these two columns is a space for the reserve, which is composed of nine cards arranged in three rows of three cards each.

Ace and King columns are the foundations. The ace foundations are built up to Kings while the king foundations are built down to aces, all by suit. When the top cards of the ace and king foundations of the same suit are in sequence, a reversal can be done, i.e. cards can be moved one at a time from one foundation to the other, except the base aces and kings.

The nine reserve cards are available for play on the foundations (not on each other). When a card leaves the reserve, the space it leaves behind is filled with the top card of the waste pile (or the stock if there is no waste pile yet).

If play comes to a standstill in the reserve, the stock is dealt one card at a time, and if a card is unplayable, it is placed on the waste pile, the top card of which is available for building on the foundations or filling a space on the reserve. Only one redeal is allowed; to do this the unused cards in the waste pile is picked up and turned face down to be used as the new stock.

The game is won when all cards end up in the foundations.

== Variations ==
The game of Odd and Even involves building by 2s, but is in essence much the same game as Patriarchs. Both Odd and Even and Patriarchs are closely related to Royal Cotillion, which has very similar rules of play but a reserve of sixteen cards. This in turn is closely related to Contradance (Cotillion) and the single-deck game Captured Queens (Quadrille), both of which have no reserve and are entirely luck-based.

Picture Patience is a solitaire game which is played exactly like Patriarchs except for the following:

- At the onset, no card is placed in the foundations; aces and kings needed are mixed in the deck.
- Reversals are not allowed.

== See also ==
- Odd and Even
- Royal Cotillion
- Cotillion (Contradance)
- Quadrille (Captured Queens)
- List of solitaire games
- Glossary of solitaire terms
