= Clog (disambiguation) =

A clog is a shoe with a rigid, often wooden, sole.

Clog may also refer to:

- Clog (British), a wooden-soled clog from Great Britain
- C.L.O.G., a clogging organization
- Clogs (band), an Australian music group
- Clog, a blockage in plumbing
- Clog, a British brand of rock-climbing equipment owned by Wild Country (company)
- "Clogs", an episode of the television series Teletubbies
- C-Log, a proprietary log profile by Canon, Inc.

== See also ==
- Clog-dancing, a traditional dance from the North of England
- Clogging, a traditional type of percussive folk dance in the United States
- Clogging (craft), the construction of Clogs
- Clock (disambiguation)
- Cloqué
