= The Clock (patience) =

Card game

The Clock, sometimes also called German Clock to distinguish it from the similarly named shuttling game of Clock, is a game of patience or card solitaire played with 52 cards of a French deck.

The game has 13 foundations for placing cards, each with a specific card value corresponding to the 12 hours of a clock. Four layers of cards in alternating colours are built on each foundation.

== Rules ==
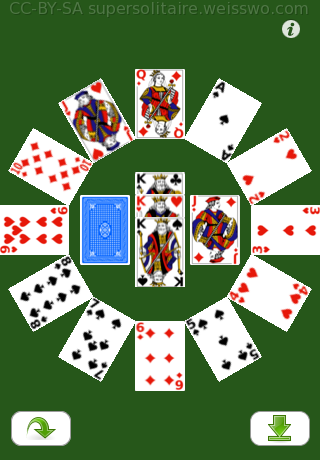
Figure 1: The Clock - Game in Progress

One French deck of 52 cards, without the Jokers, is used. All the Aces will be placed at the 1 o'clock position of an imaginary clock, all the Queens at 12 o'clock, and all the Kings in the centre.

In the accompanying image from a software implementation of this game, both the stock and waste are inside the Clock; when playing the game with a real deck, you would hold the stock in your hand and put the waste outside the Clock.

The foundation base suit is determined by the first card drawn and played. Cards are then drawn one by one from the stock. Foundations are built by alternating colours, starting with the card of that rank in the base suit. The second card on the foundation must be of the opposite colour to the foundation suit. The waste pile may be recycled twice.

It is best to play slowly. If a usable card is missed, the game becomes harder to solve. If no opportunities to move are missed, every game is solvable.

== Literature ==
- Heinrich, Rudolf (1998). Die schönsten Patiencen Königs-Patience, große Napoleon, Fächer, Uhr, Rangierbahnhof, Pyramide, Teppich, Poker-Patience und viele andere. Vol. 641 (30th ed.). Vienna: Perlen-Reihe. ISBN 3852234093.

== See also ==
- Clock Patience
- Big Ben
- Grandfather's Clock
- List of solitaires
- Glossary of solitaire
