= Royal Parade =

Royal Parade may refer to:

- Royal Parade, Melbourne, Australia
- Royal Parade (patience), an old English patience game
