= Royal Parade (patience) =

Solitaire game

- A Patience
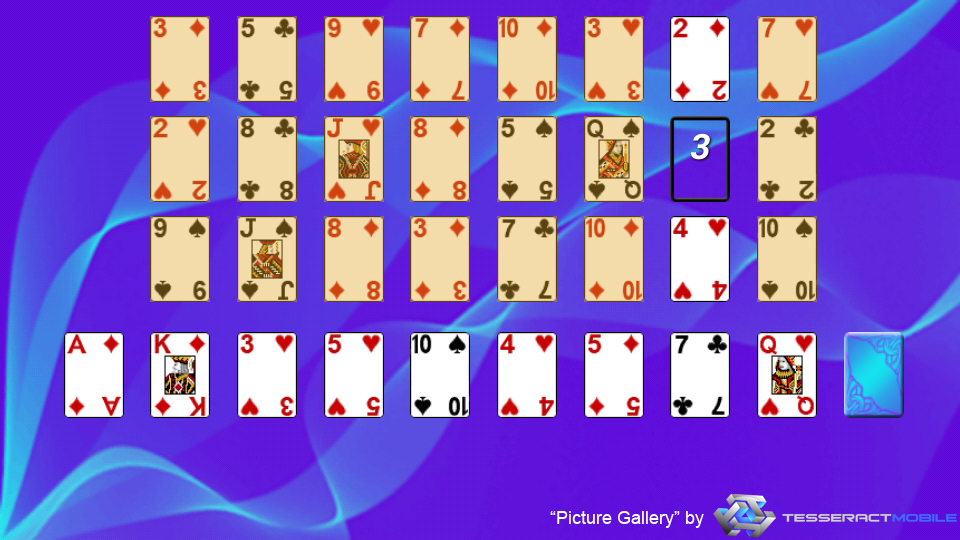
- Screenshot of Royal Parade (the pile, bottom left, is for discarded aces)
- Type: Half-open builder
- Deck: Two 52-card packs
- Playing time: 15 min
- Odds of winning: 1 in 30

Royal Parade is an old, English, two-pack patience of the half-open builder type. The object of the game is to move cards to the foundations to create a 'gallery' full of picture cards.

== History ==
The rules for Royal Parade were first published in Tarbart's 1901 compendium, Games of Patience, in which a tableau of 24 cards in 3 rows is laid out; this is called the 'Parade'. Subsequently, a row of 8 depots is laid out below it. Bergholt (1917) modifies the start in that the aces are only removed as they appear, creating additional spaces in the tableau, and, significantly, adds the privilege of allowing the last row dealt to be reversed if desired. He also gives hints on tactical play. In the first American publication of the game, Coops (1939) gives Three-Up and Hussars as alternative names. She drops the name Parade, simply calling it the tableau, and the depots are now called the talon. Phillips follows Tarbart but calls the tableau the "Grand Parade". Dalton confusingly calls the tableau the lay-out, a term normally referring to all the table cards, and the depots are called the fourth row. He also includes Bergholt's privilege. Morehead & Mott-Smith (1950) felt that the "urgency of getting foundations into position so far overrides all other considerations as to destroy nearly all opportunity for skill", and simply give Royal Parade as a variant of their new version of the game, known as Virginia Reel. The latter, by contrast, gives "great scope for skill". More recent rules usually insist on the aces being discarded before play and omit Bergholt's privilege, both of which make the game harder to get out. The rules continue to be published and the game has continued to acquire additional secondary names such as Financier and Royal Procession. (Note: No author gives the origin of the alternative names.)

== Rules ==
The following description is based on Tarbart, whose account is the basis for all subsequent descriptions.

=== Preliminaries ===
The eight aces are removed before the two packs are shuffled and cut. Three rows of eight cards are dealt to the tableau or "Parade". These form 24 foundations. When the patience is finished, the top row will be founded on the eight 2s which are built up in suit by threes, e.g. 2♣, 5♣, 8♣, J♣. The base cards of the middle row will be the 3s, again built up in suit by threes, e.g. 3♥, 6♥, 9♥, Q♥ The base cards of the last row are the 4s which are also built up in suit by threes, e.g. 4♠, 7♠, 10♠, K♠.

=== Aim ===
The aim is to build up in suit on the foundations of the Parade and by threes.

=== Play ===
After the 24 cards have been dealt to the Parade, building up commences on any 2s in the top row, 3s in the middle row and 4s in the bottom row, any spaces thus created being filled by an appropriate base card (2, 3 or 4), until there are no more build options. Then 8 cards are dealt out in a row from left to right below the Parade to form eight depots. These cards become available for play either as base cards onto any spaces or to build on existing cards as before. When all available cards have been played, another row of 8 cards is dealt onto the depots, overlapping vertically any existing cards.

=== Winning ===
If the patience goes through, there will be no cards on the depots and the middle row will comprise all the queens, the top and bottom rows containing all the kings and knaves.

== Variations ==
The two main variations that increase the chances of getting the patience out were introduced by Bergholt:

- Do not discard the aces but play them to the initial tableau (Parade), then remove them to create a space for building. (Note: Bergholt does not say what happens to aces dealt to the depots, but Parlett says they must be replaced, whereas in Virginia Reel, they are simply dealt and then removed leaving a space or a previous card that is still available for play.)
- As the last row is dealt to the depots, if the player wishes (e.g. because a card essential for play will be covered), the row may be dealt in reverse order. This privilege or grace is only permitted if the eighth card has not been put down.

== Virginia Reel ==
Albert H. Morehead and Geoffrey Mott-Smith created Virginia Reel as an improvement on Royal Parade with odds of 1 in 4 of getting it out. Differences include:

- A 2, 3, and 4 are dealt to the left of each of the tableau rows to give a head start.
- Aces are played to the tableau and then removed to leave a space (as in Bergholt's variation above).
- If the tableau has 2 or 3 different base cards in the wrong rows, these may be exchanged if, in doing so, they end up in the right rows.
- Aces are not removed but not replaced when dealt to the depots which are called the reserve.

== See also ==
- Virginia Reel
- List of patiences and solitaires
- Glossary of patience and solitaire terms

== Bibliography ==
- Bergholt, Ernest (1917). A Second New Book of Patience Games. London: Routledge.
- Coops, Helen Leslie (1939). 100 Games of Solitaire. Whitman.
- Dalton, Basil (1948). The Complete Patience Book. John Baker.
- Morehead, A. H. & G. Mott-Smith (1949). The Complete Book of Solitaire and Patience Games. NY: Longmans
- Parlett, David (1979). The Penguin Book of Patience, London: Penguin. ISBN 0-7139-1193-X
- Phillips, Hubert and Westall B.C. (1939). Complete Book of Card Games. London: Witherby.
- "Tarbart" (1901). Games of Patience. London : De La Rue.
