= Travellers (card game) =

Solitaire card game

- Old Patience of European origin
- Origin: England from Europe
- Named variants: Four of a Kind, Hidden Cards, Hide and Seek, Spoilt, Wandering Card
- Type: Non-builder
- Family: Shuttler
- Deck: Standard 52-card pack or 32-card pack (Spoilt)

Travellers is a card game of the patience or card solitaire genre which uses a single card pack of either 52 or 32 playing cards. It is an interesting game based on "an entirely new principle" which Parlett describes as a "rhythmical feature that might be called 'shuttling'", as in the game of Weavers. It should not be confused with the twin-pack patience game, also called Travellers.

== Names ==
According to Parlett, Travellers is also known as All Fours, Clock, Four of a Kind, Hidden Cards, Hunt, Sundial or Watch. However, these are all names of variations of the game first published in 1869 by Ednah Cheney under the name Wandering Card, but which is known even earlier in French and German literature. Travellers is merely the version most commonly described in the literature since the Second World War today but is probably descended from Wandering Card.

== Description ==
=== Wandering Card ===
The following rules for the original game of Wandering Card are based on Cheney (1869):

The player lays 13 cards, face up, on the table in a single row. A second row is dealt on top of the first, but this time the player counts each card as it is laid. If the value of a card (Jacks being 11, Queens 12 and Kings 13) corresponds to the number of its place (e.g. if a Six is played onto the 6th place), it is laid aside, and dealing continues down the line. This carries on until there are four cards on each pile, except where one or more cards have been laid aside.

The player now takes the top card of those laid aside and places it under the pile of the corresponding number (e.g. a Three goes under the third pile). Then the top card of that pile is moved to the bottom of the pile corresponding to its value. This continues until a pile is reached where the top card is already in its right place. Then the next card of the laid aside pile is taken up and the process repeated until the game blocks or succeeds, whereby there will be 13 piles each with four cards of the same value and in the order A 2 3... K.

=== Travellers ===
The rules for the very similar game of Travellers' Patience were published in 1888 by Mary Whitmore Jones and have changed little since. The following is based on Parlett (1979):

Twelve piles of 4 cards each are laid out on the table, face up, and a further talon of four cards, face down. The piles are named, in order, the Ace pile, the Queens pile and so on, down to the Twos. The aim is to end with thirteen piles of four, each pile consisting of cards of the same rank as the name of the pile. The top card of the talon is flipped and placed at the bottom of its corresponding named pile. The top card of that pile is taken and placed under its named pile and so on. If the top card is a King, it is placed in a separate Kings pile.

One variation allows a player to replace the final king with a facedown card in order to keep playing, and the game only ends if the fourth king reappears.

== Variants ==
The Clock. This variant was also recorded by Cheney (1869). The principle is the same as Wandering Card, but modified to make it more pictorial. This time twelve piles of four cards are placed face downwards in a circle representing the dial of a clock, with pile 1 at 1 o'clock etc. The thirteenth pile goes in the centre, also face down, as the reserve. Shuttling starts with the top card of the centre pile. Cards are placed, face up. under the pile corresponding to their number on the clock dial and the Kings under the centre pile. This game should not be confused with Big Ben, Grandfather's Clock or the member of the Simple Addition family also called Clock.

Four of a Kind. This variant with a different layout and different procedure first appears in Foster's Hoyle (1897). The cards are dealt, face down, to two rows of five piles and one of three, each pile containing four cards. The top card of the first, or Ace, pile is picked up and placed under the pile corresponding to its value. Then the top card of the second pile is moved and so on. The top cards of each pile in sequence continue to be moved; a completed pile may be skipped. If the last card to be turned is on its proper pile, the game is won; if it has to be moved it is lost.

Hidden Cards. This variant was published by Hoffmann in 1892. Twelve cards are dealt, face up, in two rows of six, and the thirteenth placed face down to one side to start the reserve. This is repeated three times until there are four cards in each pile. Shuttling begins with the uppermost card of the first pile (top left). When a King appears, it is placed in a fresh pile centrally below the initial two rows and the next card taken from the reserve. Hoffmann describes a card placed at the bottom of a pile as 'hidden' hence the name.

Hide and Seek. In a German variant called Versteckenspiel, there are 13 piles from Ace to Two, laid out face-down this time in a row of seven and a row of six. The first pickup is from the Ace pile; thereafter shuttling takes place as described above.

Spoilt is a 32-card variant in which cards are dealt face down in four rows of seven plus a reserve of four downcards. Label the rows by suit (e.g. Clubs, Spades, Hearts, Diamonds or Acorns, Leaves, Hearts, Bells) and number the columns in ascending order from 8 to Ace. Thus every card bar the 7s has a place in the tableau. Take the top card of the reserve pile and place it in its place on the tableau removing the downcard that was there moving it, in turn, to its rightful place. Continue shuttling in this way. When a Seven appears place it to the left of the place for the Eight of the same suit. If the last Seven is turned before the tableau is finished, turn any downcard; if it is in the right place, continue; if not, the game is 'spoilt'.

== See also ==
- List of patiences and solitaires
- Glossary of patience and solitaire terms

== Bibliography ==
- Cheney, Mrs. E. D. (1869). Patience: A Series of Games with Cards. 2nd edn, with additions. Boston: Lee & Shepard. NY: Lee, Shepard & Dillingham.
- Foster, Robert Frederick (1897). Foster’s Complete Hoyle. 3rd edn. New York and London: Frederick. A. Stokes.
- Heinrich, Rudolf (2011). Die schönsten Patiencen, Perlag-Reihe Vol. 641, 35th edition. Vienna: Perlag-Reihe. ISBN 978-3-99006-001-8
- Parlett, David (1979). The Penguin Book of Patience. London: Penguin. ISBN 0 7139 1193 X
- Whitmore Jones, Mary (1888,90). Games of Patience for One or More Players. 1st Series. London: L. Upcott Gill.
