= Faerie Solitaire =

2009 video game

- Developer: Subsoap
- Publisher: Subsoap
- Platforms: Windows, Linux, Mac OS X
- Release: March 15, 2009 (Windows), November 2, 2012 (Mac OS X), February 8, 2013 (Linux)
- Genre: Solitaire
- Mode: Single-player

Faerie Solitaire is a video game created and developed by independent video game developer and publisher Subsoap. The game was released 15 March 2009. This game mixes solitaire elements with fantasy and role-playing game elements.

Faerie Solitaire won The Wall Street Journal's Gamehouse "Most Addictive Game" in 2010.

Faerie Solitaire Remastered was released on November 22, 2017. A sequel to the game, Faerie Solitaire Dire, was released September 7, 2020.
