= The Clock =

The Clock or The Clocks may refer to:

== Film ==
- The Clock (1917 film), a silent American film
- The Clock (1945 film), an American film
- The Clock (2010 film), a 24-hour art video by Christian Marclay

== Literature ==
- Clock (character), the first masked comic book crime-fighter character, initially published in 1936
- The Clocks, a 1963 novel by Agatha Christie
- The Clocks, a 2009 collection of poetry by Australian poet Omar Musa

== Music ==
- "The Clock" (song), a 1953 song by Johnny Ace
- "The Clock", a nickname for Haydn's Symphony No. 101
- "The Clock", a song by Paul Simon

== Radio and television ==
- The Clock (radio), a dramatic anthology radio series from 1946 to 1948
- The Clock (TV series), a television series
- "The Clock" (The Americans), an episode from the television series The Americans
- "The Clocks", an episode of Strange Experiences

== Other uses ==
- The Clock (patience), a patience or solitaire game

== See also ==
- Clock (disambiguation)
