= Virginia Reel =

Virginia Reel may refer to:

- Virginia Reel (solitaire), a solitaire card game
- Virginia reel (dance), a folk dance
- Virginia Reel roller coaster, a type of roller coaster
