= Virginia Reel (solitaire) =

Solitaire card game

- A card solitaire
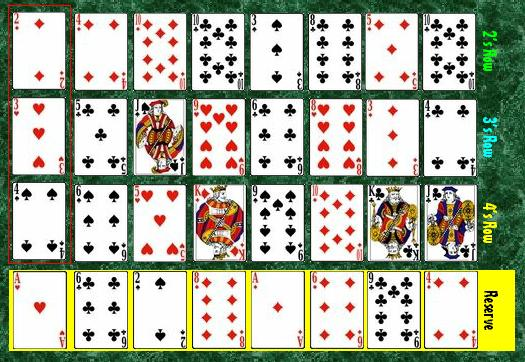
- Game setup
- Type: Half-open builder
- Deck: Two 52-card packs
- Playing time: 20 min
- Odds of winning: 1 in 4

Virginia Reel is a solitaire card game which uses two decks of 52 playing cards mixed together. The object of the game is to place all the cards in the 24 foundations. It was created by Albert H. Morehead and Geoffrey Mott-Smith as an improvement on the older game of Royal Parade.

== Rules ==
First three cards, a 2, a 3, and a 4, are placed vertically, and beside each of these three cards a row of seven cards is laid out. The first row is known as the "2s' row," the second row the "3s' row," and the third row the "4s' row," with the first card indicating the rank of all the foundations in that row.

A fourth row of eight cards is dealt beneath this, and serves as the reserve.

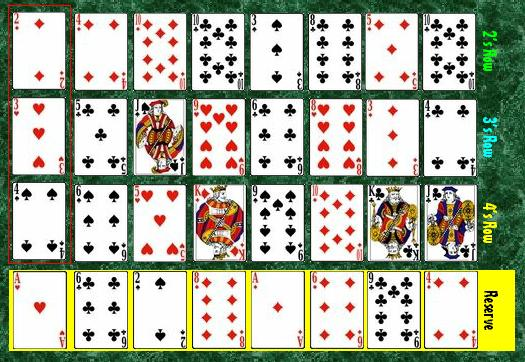
The starting layout for the game of Virginia Reel. The game of Royal Parade starts the same way.

The foundations are built up by suit in intervals of three, as illustrated in the table below.

2	5	8	J
3	6	9	Q
4	7	10	K

To play, a card can be moved to a foundation or to a rightful row from the other rows or from the reserve. When a card is moved from anywhere in the tableau, the gap it leaves behind must be filled with a card appropriate for the row where the gap is located. For instance, when a card has left the 2s' row, the gap it left behind must be filled with a 2, either from the other rows or from the reserve. This is especially true at the beginning of the game, where some cards are on each other's rows like a 4 in the 3s' row and a 3 in the 4s' row; a special rule allows exchanging cards to their rightful rows in this case.

While the first card in each row is already a foundation in itself and it can be built on, once a card ends up in its proper row it becomes a foundation itself.

The top cards in the reserve are in play and can be placed on the foundations, or be placed on a row (if it is a 2, 3, or 4). Empty spaces in the reserve are not filled until eight new cards are dealt when no more moves are possible.

Aces play no part in this game, and aces in the reserve are immediately discarded. An ace in any of the rows must be replaced by any applicable card for that row, e.g. to discard an ace from the 2s' row, a 2 must be available to replace it.

The game is considered won when all the cards are in foundations, with all face cards on top.

== Royal Parade ==
Royal Parade is played much the same way as Virginia Reel, and is a classic two-deck game with alternative names Financier, Hussars, and Three Up. It is the original game on which Albert H. Morehead and Geoffrey Mott-Smith based Virginia Reel, which they created as an improvement on Royal Parade.

One difference between Royal Parade and Virginia Reel is that in Royal Parade when a card is moved from anywhere in the tableau, the gap it leaves behind does not have to be filled right away, but can be filled later by a card appropriate for the row that the gap is located in.

Several variants of both games exist, most of which adjust how the reserve works, e.g. allowing empty spaces in the reserve to be filled with other cards.

== See also ==
- Royal Parade
- List of solitaire games
- Glossary of solitaire terms
