= Good Thirteen =

German card game

- A patience game
- Origin: Germany
- Type: Non-builder
- Family: Adding and pairing
- Deck: Single 52-card French pack

Related games
- Baroness, Eight Cards

Good Thirteen (German: Die gute Dreizehn) is a simple, German patience game for one person, played using a French pack of 52 playing cards. It also goes under the name Thirteens. (Note: See, for example, Morehead & Mott-Smith (2001), p. 37, in which, however, there are two rows of 5 cards instead of one of 10.)

== Rules ==
A standard French deck of 52 playing cards is shuffled and placed face down as a stock on the table. The top ten cards are dealt face-up in a row on the table as the starting layout.

Pairs of cards adding up to 13 points, regardless of their suit, are removed and placed to one side. The card values of the pip cards correspond to their face value. In addition, the Ace scores one, the Jack eleven, the Queen twelve, and the King thirteen. Individual Kings, which are the only cards with a value of 13, may be removed on their own. The resulting gaps are filled with new cards from the stock.

- Example: In the following layout the, single King and the pairs 8+5, 10+3, and Jack (11)+2 can be removed.

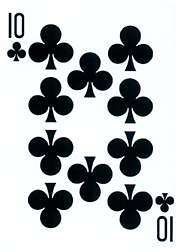

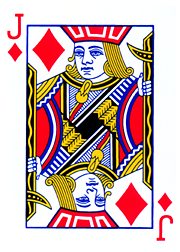

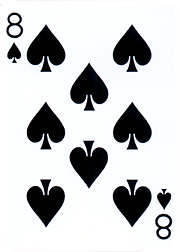

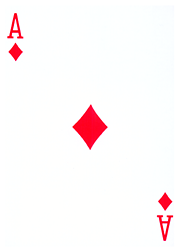

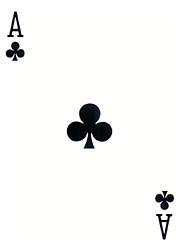

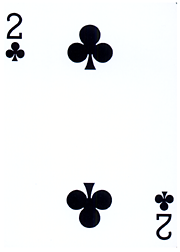

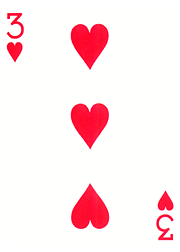

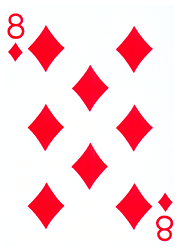

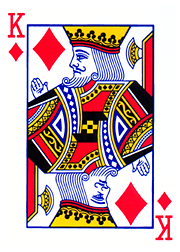

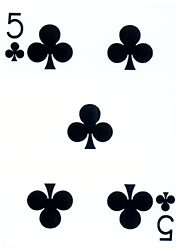

The game ends when the stock is exhausted. If all the cards have been removed, the patience has been solved; if not, the player has lost.

== Variations ==
Thirteen is similar to another German patience, Eight Cards (Acht Karten), in which eight cards are laid out, and pairs and individual cards totalling 11 points are removed.

It is also closely related to the more difficult to complete English patience game Baroness (alternatively called Five Piles). This plays in the same way, by removing cards totalling 13 points, but has a starting layout of just five cards, and where five cards are dealt at a time from the stock.

== See also ==
- Eight Cards
- Baroness
- List of patiences and solitaires
- Glossary of patience and solitaire terms

== Literature ==
- Morehead, A.H. and G. Mott-Smith (2001). The Complete Book of Solitaire and Patience. Foulsham, Slough. ISBN 0-572-02654-4
- Wolter-Rosendorf, Irmgard (1994). Patiencen in Wort und Bild (= Falken-Bücherei. Vol. 63). Falken-Verlag, Niedernhausen/Ts. 1994, ISBN 3-8068-2003-1.
