= Doomsday Clock (disambiguation) =

The Doomsday Clock is a symbol that represents the estimated likelihood of a human-made global catastrophe.

Doomsday Clock may also refer to:

- Doomsday Clock (comics), a superhero comic book series published by DC Comics
- Doomsday Clock (song), a song by the American alternative rock group the Smashing Pumpkins

== See also ==
- Clock (disambiguation)
- Doomsday
