= British Blockade =

Solitaire card game

British Blockade, also known as Parallels, is an old English patience or card solitaire of the blockade family which is played with two packs of playing cards. The name British Blockade was given to distinguish it from French Blockade which, however, is not a blockade game. The name Parallels is simply derived from the fact that the cards are lined up in rows parallel to each other.

== Rules ==
First, one King and one Ace of each suit is removed and the Aces and Kings are each lined into columns to form the foundations. The Aces are built up while the Kings are built down all by suit.

Between the two foundation columns, the player deals a row of ten cards, forming the tableau. All of these cards are available for play on the foundations and the spaces they leave behind are immediately filled from the stock.

When play comes to a stand still, a second row of ten cards is dealt below the first row. All cards are still available for play and the spaces left behind are immediately filled from the stock.

When play comes to a stand still a second time, a third row of ten cards is dealt. At this point onwards, the following rules apply:

- A card is available to be built to the foundations if at least one of its narrower edges is free. Therefore, the cards at the top and bottom rows are available for play and cards in the middle rows become available after a card immediately above or below it is played.
- There is no compulsion in filling spaces in the tableau. As long as there are moves available for the player to make, spaces can be filled later.
- All spaces in the tableau must be filled when play goes on a standstill. The order is from left to right, top to bottom. There is no building at this point.
- When the existing spaces in the tableau are filled, another row of ten cards is dealt at the bottom of the existing rows.
- Peeking on the next card in the stock is not allowed; doing so will force that card to be dealt to the tableau.

Reversals are allowed, i.e. when the two foundations of the same suit meet at one point, the player can move the cards from one foundation to the other except the base cards (ace and king) of the foundations.

The game ends when play stops after the stock has run out. The game is won when all cards are built into the foundations.

== See also ==
- Patience terminology

== Literature ==
- Parlett, David Sidney (1979). The Penguin book of patience. London: A. Lane. ISBN 0-7139-1193-X. OCLC 6633144.
