= Odd and Even =

Solitaire game played with two decks of playing cards

Odd and Even is a solitaire card game which is played with two decks of playing cards. It is so called because the building is done in twos, resulting in odd and even numbers.

== Rules ==
First, nine cards are dealt in three rows of three cards each, all laid out, to form the reserve.

As they become available, one Ace and one Deuce (or Two) of each suit are placed in the foundations, each to be built up by suit in twos. Therefore, the order of building should be as follows:

On the Aces: 3-5-7-9-J-K-2-4-6-8-10-Q
On the Deuces: 4-6-8-10-Q-A-3-5-7-9-J-K

The nine cards in the reserve are all available for play, to be built on the foundations (no building on the reserve). Gaps in the reserve are immediately filled with cards from the wastepile, or if there is no wastepile yet, the stock.

When play goes to a stand still, the stock is dealt one a time. A card from the stock that cannot be built on the foundations is placed on the wastepile, the top card of which is available for play.

One redeal is allowed. To do this, the player can pick up the wastepile and turn it over to be used as the new stock.

The game ends soon after the entire stock is redealt. The game is won when all cards end up in the foundations.

== Variations ==
The game of Patriarchs does not involve building by 2s, but is in essence the same game as Odd and Even.

Odd and Even is also closely related to Royal Cotillion, which has very similar game-play but has a reserve of sixteen cards. This in turn is closely related to Contradance (Cotillion) and the single-deck game Captured Queens (Quadrille), both of which have no reserve and are entirely luck-based.

== See also ==
- Patriarchs
- Royal Cotillion
- Cotillion (Contradance)
- Quadrille (Captured Queens)
- List of solitaire games
- Glossary of solitaire terms
