= Royal Cotillion =

Solitaire card game

Royal Cotillion is a solitaire card game which uses two decks of 52 playing cards each. The name probably derives from the fact that since there two kings and two queens of the same suit, the kings and queens of each suit dance the cotillion. It has been given the alternate (but little-known) name of Lords and Ladies because if the game is won, the final layout will show the king and queen of each suit together.

Royal Cotillion is closely related to Cotillion (Contradance) and the single-deck game Quadrille (Captured Queens), both of which have no reserve and are entirely luck-based.

== Rules ==
First, the ace and the deuce (two card) of each suit is removed and are laid down on the tableau. The Aces take up the left column, the deuces at the right column. These cards make up the foundations.

Then twelves cards are laid to the left of the aces in four columns of three cards, either overlapping or laid out in a grid. Their side (the left wing) is called "the ladies' side." After that, sixteen cards are laid out to the left of the deuces in a 4x4 grid. Their side (the right wing) is called "the lords' side."

All cards on the lords' side are available for play and if any of them is moved to the foundations, it is replaced from the top card of the waste pile. In case a waste pile is not yet available, replacement cards are laid from the stock. On the other hand, the top cards of each column on the ladies' side (if overlapping; the card and the lowest tier of each column if laid out) are the only ones available and once any of them is moved, it is not replaced. Each of the cards cannot be transferred from one side to the other or to any pile on the same side; they can be only transferred to the foundations.

Building on both the Ace and Deuce foundations is up by suit in twos. Therefore:
A: 3-5-7-9-J-K-2-4-6-8-10-Q
2: 4-6-8-10-Q-A-3-5-7-9-J-K

If the player has made all possible moves, or all moves the player wanted to make, the player then deals the cards from the stock one at a time to the wastepile, the top card of which is available for play. The stock can only be dealt once.

The game is won when all cards end up in the foundations, each having thirteen cards, with the Kings at the right column and the Queens at the left.

== Gavotte ==
Gavotte or Odds and Evens (also known as Palace) is a rare solitaire game that is a variant of Royal Cotillion. It has two differences to the parent game:

- Two groups of sixteen cards are dealt, both arranged in four rows of four cards. The player then chooses which group of cards would be completely available for play (as the lords' side); the other group become the ladies' side and would either:
  - Have each column of cards overlap with its top card available for play, or...
  - Leave the cards as they are as a grid and have the bottom card of each column available.
- The player can choose which ranks start the two groups of foundations. It can be of different ranks (such as 6s and 7s) or of the same rank (such as all 9s).

== Odd and Even ==
Odd and Even (distinct from the previously mentioned "Odds and Evens" game) is a game much like Royal Cotillion but has a reserve of nine cards instead of sixteen.

== See also ==
- Odd and Even
- Patriarchs
- Cotillion (Contradance)
- Quadrille (Captured Queens)
- List of solitaire games
- Glossary of solitaire terms
