= Butterflying =

Method of preparing meat for cooking

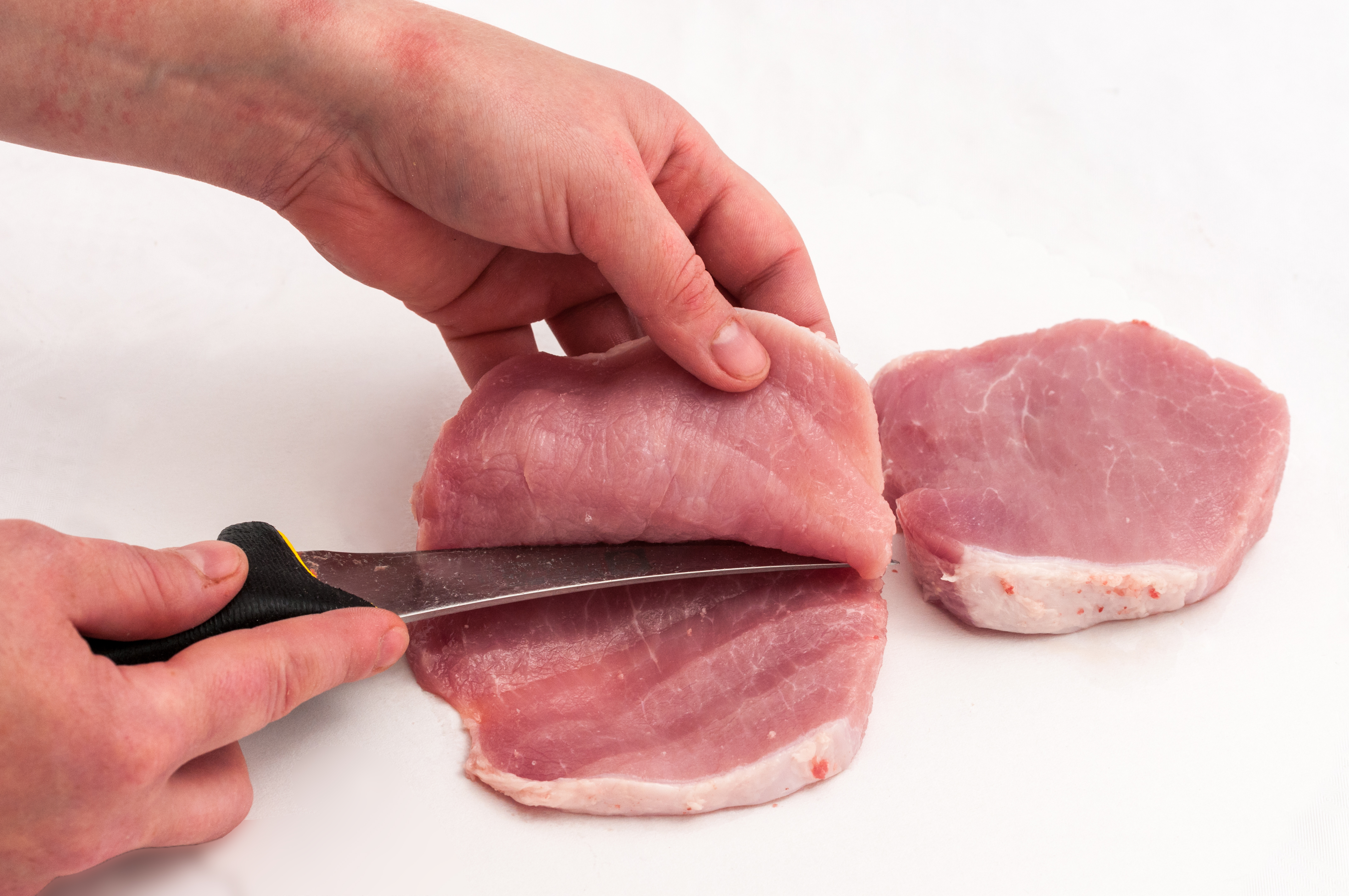
Butterflying pork loin

Butterflying is a way of preparing meat, fish, or poultry for cooking by cutting it almost in two, but leaving the two parts connected; it is then often boned and flattened. Spatchcocking is a specific method for butterflying poultry that involves removing the backbone, and spatchcock as a noun may refer to a bird prepared in that way.

== Etymology ==
"Butterfly" comes from the resemblance of the cut to the wings of a butterfly.

== Red meat ==
In butchery, butterflying transforms a thick, compact piece of meat into a thinner, larger one. The meat is laid out on a cutting board and cut in half parallel to the board almost all the way to the other side, leaving a small "hinge", which is used to fold the meat out like a book. This technique is often used as an alternative to, or in conjunction with, pounding out the meat with a meat mallet to make it thinner.

For leg of lamb, it is generally followed by boning.

Common uses of this technique include creating thin cutlets from chicken breasts for dishes such as chicken piccata, or rendering lamb leg roasts suitable for making roulades. It can also be a first step to dicing chicken or slicing it into strips. Because the butterflying technique results in a thinner piece of meat or poultry, it allows for quicker cooking times and often more even cooking.

== Poultry and "spatchcocking" ==
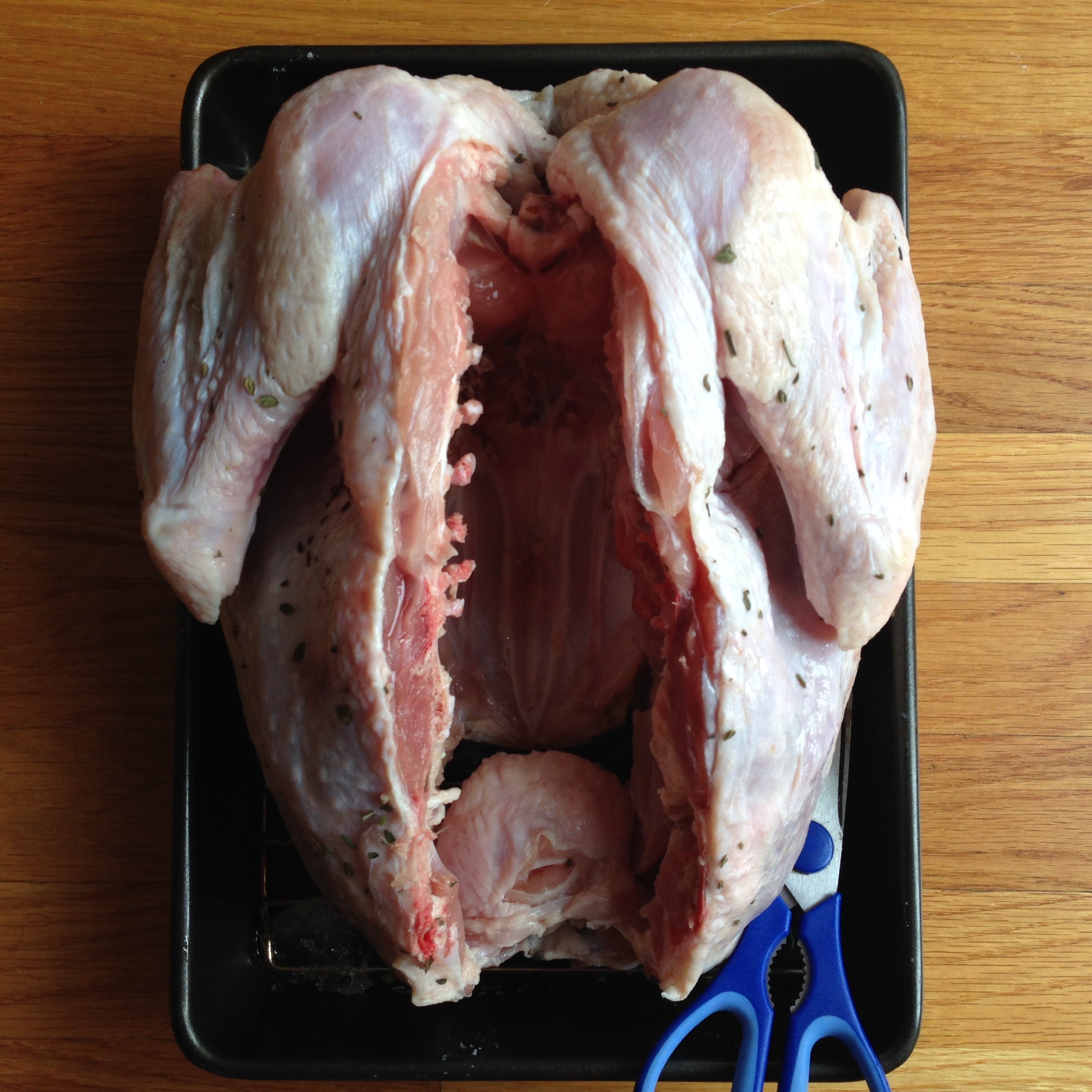
Turkey with backbone removed in preparation for spatchcocking

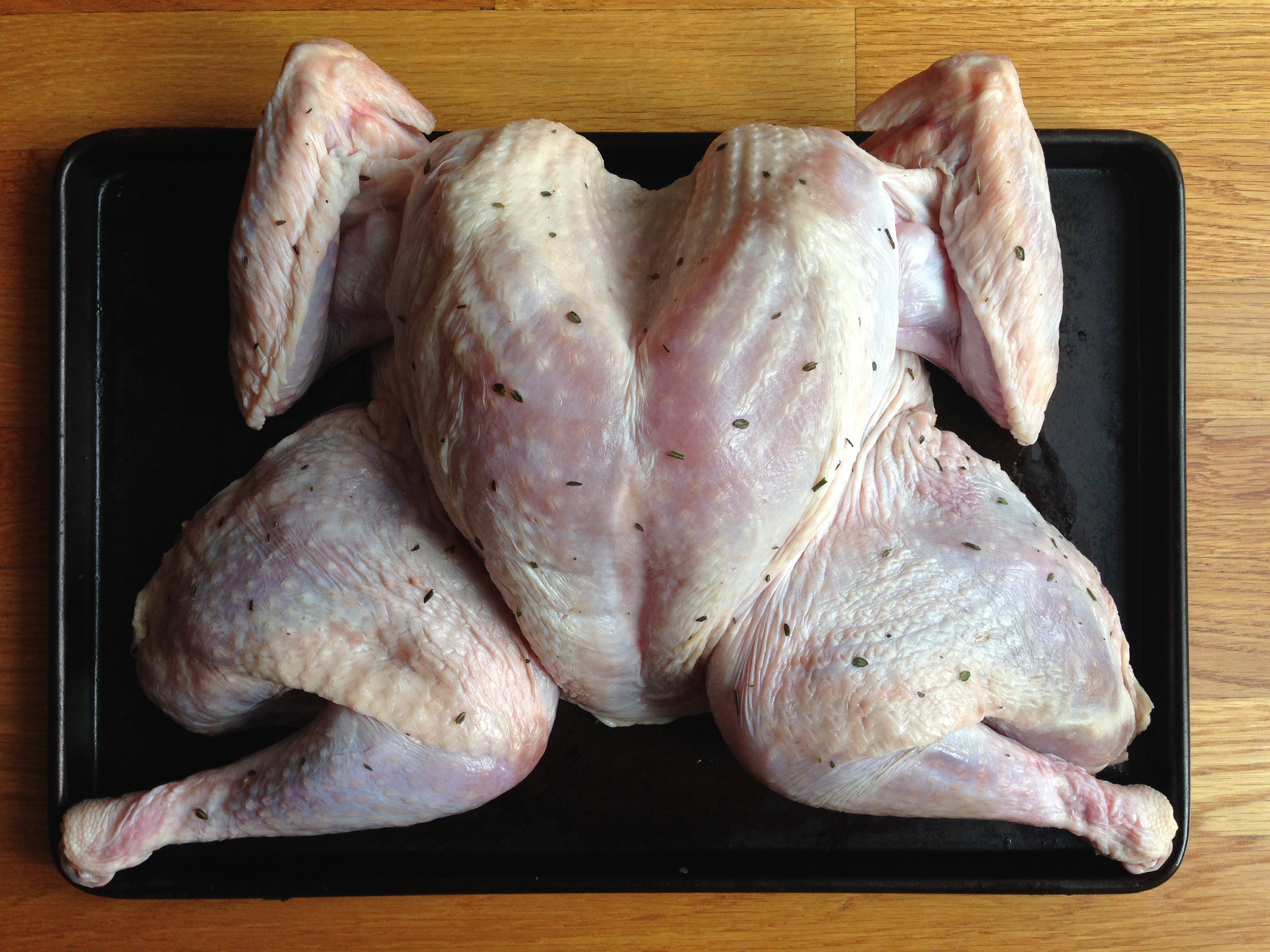
Spatchcocked turkey

Poultry is often butterflied. Butterflying makes poultry easier to grill or pan-broil.

The more specific term spatchcocking refers to a variation on butterflying that also removes the backbone and possibly the sternum, typically from a smaller bird. Removing the sternum allows the bird to be flattened more fully. This is popular for grilling, roasting, or cooking sous-vide.

According to The Oxford Companion to Food by Alan Davidson, the word spatchcock could be found in cookbooks as far back as the 18th and 19th centuries. It was thought to be of Irish origin, possibly short for "dispatch cock," which referred to "grilling a bird after splitting it open down the back and spreading the two halves out flat." It may also derive from "spitchcock," a method of grilling eels.

Spatchcock may also be used as a noun to refer to a small bird that has been prepared by spatchcocking.

== Fish ==
A butterfly fillet of fish is a double fillet, with the backbone and other bones removed by splitting the fish down the back or the belly.

== Other ==
Butterflying shrimp or lobster tail involves cutting the hard top side, without cutting all the way down to the other, softer side.

== See also ==
- Accordion cut
