= Philip Morehead =

American musician

Philip David Morehead
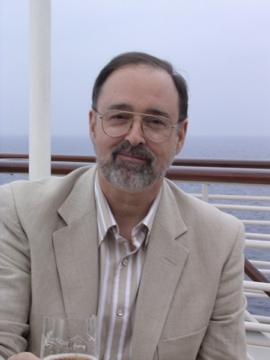
- Morehead circa 2006
- Born: 1942 (age 83–84); Manhattan, New York, United States
- Occupation: Musician
- Children: James Morehead, Keren Morehead, Ian Morehead
- Parent(s): Albert Hodges Morehead, Loy Claudon Morehead

Philip David Morehead (born 1942) is an American pianist, conductor and vocal coach now retired as head of music staff of the Lyric Opera of Chicago, and the Patrick G. and Shirley W. Ryan Opera Center (formerly the Lyric Opera Center for American Artists).

== Biography ==
He was born in New York City in 1942, the son of writer Albert Hodges Morehead, and learned to play the piano at age four. He attended Trinity School in New York City, The Baylor School in Chattanooga, Tennessee, Swarthmore College where he majored in French, Harvard University where he majored in musicology and received an M.A., and the New England Conservatory of Music where he majored in piano performance and received an M.M. He then studied for two years in Paris and in Fontainebleau with Nadia Boulanger. He later married Patricia Noonan of Winnipeg, Manitoba. e=bio/>

Morehead retired from Lyric Opera of Chicago in 2015 and currently resides in Dwight, Ontario, Canada. He is a member of the Muskoka Concert Band in Huntsville, Ontario and was Music Director of the Highlands Opera Studio in Haliburton, Ontario, where he conducted performances of Gounod Faust, Mozart Così fan tutte, Puccini La Boheme and Strauss Ariadne auf Naxos. He is married to Patricia Morehead, PhD. (oboist and composer) and has three adult children (James, Keren and Ian).

== Editor ==
- New American Roget's College Thesaurus, ISBN 0-451-20716-5
- New American Crossword Puzzle Dictionary, ISBN 0-451-21255-X
- The New American Webster's Handy College Dictionary ISBN 0-451-18166-2
- Hoyle's Rules of Games, ISBN 0-451-20484-0

== Author ==
- Dictionary of Music, The New American, ISBN 0-525-93345-X
- The Bloomsbury Dictionary of Music, ISBN 0-7475-1576-X
- The Penguin Roget's College Thesaurus in Dictionary Form, ISBN 0-670-03016-3
