= Clocks (American band) =

American new wave and pop rock band

- Also known as: The Clocks
- Origin: Wichita, Kansas, United States
- Genres: New wave; power pop; pop rock
- Years active: 1982-1983, 2003-2004
- Labels: Boulevard Records
- Past members: Gerald Graves; Jerry Sumner; Steve Swaim; Lance Threet

Clocks was an American new wave and pop rock band from Wichita, Kansas, known for their hit "She Looks a Lot Like You" which peaked at No. 67 on the Billboard Hot 100. and No. 47 on the Mainstream Rock chart. The music video for "She Looks a Lot Like You" received airplay on MTV. Jerry Sumner has stated the band's recording contract came through their management Good Karma Productions. After the band broke up, Jerry Sumner was asked to sing for a band named Dogs?. In 2003, the band reunited to release their second album "The Black Box". However, it would not be commercially released until 2004. In 2012, the band was inducted into the Kansas Music Hall of Fame. Band member Gerald Graves died in 2016.

== Discography ==
Clocks (1982) (includes "She Looks a Lot Like You", No. 67)

The Black Box (2004)
