= Simple Addition =

Family of card games

Simple Addition or Totals is a family of patience or card solitaire games that share certain aims and procedures.

== Composition ==
Moyse counts the games of Elevens, Fifteens, Tens and Thirteens as part of the Simple Addition family. Parlett adds Baroness, Block Eleven and Block Ten, Decade, Haden, Nines, Seven Up or Seventh Wonder, Pyramid or Pile of Twenty-Eight, Fourteens and Eighteens or Ferris Wheel, Grand Round or Wheel.

Simple Addition sometimes also refers specifically to the game of Thirteens.

== Bibliography ==
- Dick, Harris B. (1898). Dick's games of patience; or, Solitaire with cards. 2nd Series. 113 pp. 70 games. NY: Dick & Fitzgerald.
- Moyse, Alphonse Jr. (1950). 150 Ways to Play Solitaire. USPCC. 128 pp.
- Parlett, David (1979). The Penguin Book of Patience, London: Penguin. ISBN 0-7139-1193-X
