= Grandfather's Clock =

Card game

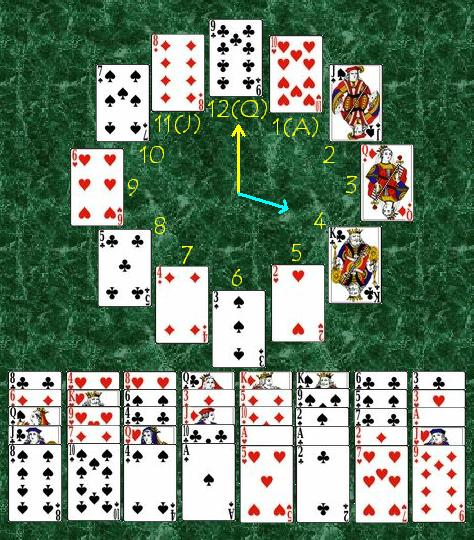
The initial layout in a game of Grandfather's Clock. The clock face is for visualization.

Grandfather's Clock is an easy patience or solitaire card game using a deck of 52 playing cards. Its foundation is akin to Clock Patience; but while winning the latter depends entirely on the luck of the draw, Grandfather's Clock has a strategic side, with the chances of winning being around 3 out of 4 games, especially if careful consideration is given to which cards would be released in instances where you have a choice of plays between identical cards.

== Rules ==
Before the game begins, the following cards are taken out of the deck: 2♥, 3♠, 4♦, 5♣, 6♥, 7♠, 8♦, 9♣, 10♥, J♠, Q♦, K♣. They are then arranged in a circular fashion like a clock face with the 2♥ on the "five o' clock" position, 3♠ on the "six o' clock" position, and so on. These cards will be the foundations. The remaining cards are then shuffled and dealt into eight columns of five cards each on the tableau.

The object of the game is to distribute the cards to the foundations to the point that the top cards of the foundations show the correct numbers on the clock face. Queens are assigned a value of twelve, and Jacks a value of eleven.

Each foundation should be built up by suit until the card with the correct corresponding number on the clock face is placed. The cards on the tableau are built down regardless of suit. Only the top cards of each column are available for play. Only one card can be moved at a time and any space that occurs may be filled with any available card.

The game ends either when all cards are put into the foundations with the clock face showing the correct numbers, or when no cards in the tableau can be moved.

== Variations ==
Big Ben (sometimes called Clock) is a closely related game with similar game-play, but played with two decks.

== See also ==
- Clock Patience
- Big Ben (solitaire)
- The Clock (German Clock)
- List of solitaires
- Glossary of solitaire
