= Accordion cut =

Technique in butchery

An accordion cut is a technique in butchery, similar to butterflying, in which a thick piece of meat is extended into a thin one with a larger surface area. A series of parallel cuts are made from alternating sides of a roast almost all the way through, creating "hinges" which allow the meat to unfold into a long, flat piece. The technique allows faster cook time and increases the surface area of the meat.

This technique is often used in conjunction with pounding with a meat mallet to further thin and even out the cut.

A similar technique is also seen in accordion potatoes (also known as Hasselback potatoes), where the potatoes are sliced across the surface to create a larger surface area.

== See also ==
- Butterflying
