= Windows Clock =

Time management in Microsoft Windows

- Windows Clock on Windows 11 in light mode
- Developer: Microsoft
- Release: As UWP: December 9, 2013; 12 years ago
- Stable release: July 2026 Update (11.2607.20) / November 12, 2026; 1 day ago
- Operating system: Windows 10, 11 Discontinued: Windows 8, 8.1 (2023); Windows 10 Mobile (2020); Windows Phone 8.1 (2017); Windows Phone 8 (2016); Pocket PC 2000 (2007)

Windows Clock (known as Clock & Alarms on Pocket PC 2000, Alarms on Windows 8.1, and, until July 2022, Alarms & Clock on Windows 10) is a time management app for Microsoft Windows, with five key features: alarms, world clocks, timers, a stopwatch, and focus sessions. The features are listed on a sidebar. The app is similar in functionality and design to the Clock app on iOS. Windows Clock was available on mobile devices for over a decade before it was available on PCs with the introduction of Windows 8.1. Tiles for alarms, timers, and the stopwatch can be pinned to the Start menu. The latest version of the app uses the Universal Windows Platform APIs and adopts Windows UI theme (dark or light). Windows Clock is distinct from the Windows taskbar's clock, which has been part of Windows since 1995.

== Features ==
=== Alarms ===
The alarms are listed vertically by the time of day and can be activated or deactivated with an ovular on/off switch. It is possible to delete a selection of alarms simultaneously by clicking on the list button and using the control key with or without the shift key to select alarms.

Alarms can be created by clicking the plus button and edited by clicking or tapping on them. It is possible to change the time, name, recurrence by day of the week, sound, and snooze time. The current list of sounds in the order listed is Chimes, Xylophone, Chords, Tap, Jingle, Transition, Descending, Bounce, Echo, and Ascending.

Alarms are triggered by a special type of toast notification for alarms. Due to hardware limitations, alarms cannot always appear on certain devices that are powered off. In order for an alarm to ring on a PC that is off, InstantGo must be included in the device. Prior to the Windows 10 Creators Update, Alarms & Clock (as it was called at the time) was the only app that could make an alarm notification appear during quiet hours, but third-party alarms running on Windows 10 version 1704 or later also ring during quiet hours by default.

=== World clock ===
The world clock list detects the user's location and shows the local time on the user's location on a world map. Users can search for additional locations to show on the map. When other times are displayed, the World Clock feature calculates how far ahead or behind the other times are from the user's local time. It is also possible to compare what nonlocal times will be at a specified local time. When the map is minimized horizontally, the times are shown in a vertical list below the map instead of on it.

Users who would simply like a window with an easily visible clock can type timedate.cpl in the Run dialog box (⊞ Win+R).

=== Timer ===
Timers can be created and named by clicking the plus button at the bottom, like alarms. It is possible to edit, reset or delete a timer.

Multiple timers can be set to run simultaneously. The zoom button on a timer replaces the background with the Windows accent colors, hides other timers and the ribbon, and enlarges the time shown. Arrow navigation buttons allow users to switch between timers in this view.

Timers provide notifications when they end.

=== Stopwatch ===
One stopwatch may be run at a time. A flag button allows the user to record lap times and a share button allows users to share times with other UWP apps. Similarly to timers, the stopwatch has a resize button that simplifies the interface by changing the background and hiding the lap values.

=== Focus sessions ===
The "Focus sessions" feature was first made available in Windows 11 and was backported to Windows 10, with version 11.2205.23.0. It intends to help the user focus on whatever tasks they have. There is also a progress indicator which allows you to view your focus session information and progress. Focus sessions also have Spotify and Microsoft To Do integration.
