= Accordion (company) =

American Consulting Company

Accordion Partners LLC
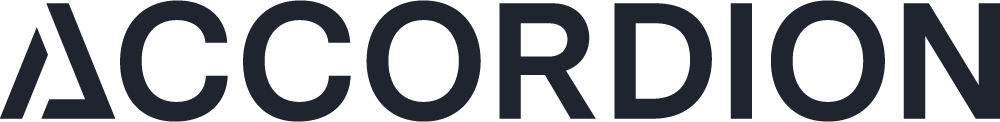
- Trade name: Accordion
- Type: Private company
- Industry: Consulting firm
- Founded: 2009
- Founder: Nick Leopard
- Headquarters: New York City, New York, United States
- Number of locations: New York City, Los Angeles, San Francisco, Chicago, Dallas, Boston, Hyderabad, Atlanta, Charlotte, London
- Area served: Global
- Key people: Nick Leopard (CEO & Founder); Atul Aggarwal (President); Jon Apter (CFO)
- Services: Corporate Finance; Financial Advisory; Forensic Accounting; Turnaround; Restructuring; Management consulting Data & Analytics
- Number of employees: 1,200+
- Website: Accordion.com

Accordion Partners LLC is a private equity-focused business advisory and management consulting firm headquartered in New York operating under Accordion brand. The firm specializes in corporate and strategic finance, merger and acquisition execution, public company readiness, turnaround and restructuring, and AI & CFO technology.

== History ==
Accordion was founded in 2009 as Accordion Partners LLC by Nick Leopard, a former Bear Stearns investment banker. According to The Wall Street Journal, the firm "specializes in services for the chief financial officers and finance teams at private-equity portfolio companies."

In 2017, Accordion announced the expansion of their services into California with the opening of their San Francisco office.

In 2018, the private equity firm FFL Partners took a minority stake in Accordion.

Atul Aggarwal joined as president in April 2019 to support the firm's new operating model and accelerate growth. Aggarwal was previously a Partner at Bain & Company.

In March 2020, Accordion launched Maestro, a software platform designed to maximize value in private equity-backed companies. Maestro would go on to be spun off and secured $7,200,000 in a Series A round of funding led by S&P Global Market Intelligence.

In May 2021, the company acquired turnaround and restructuring firm Mackinac Partners.

Early in 2022, Accordion acquired the Enterprise Performance Management (EPM) consulting firm Platform Specialists. In June 2022, they announced their Dallas office expansion and move Uptown.

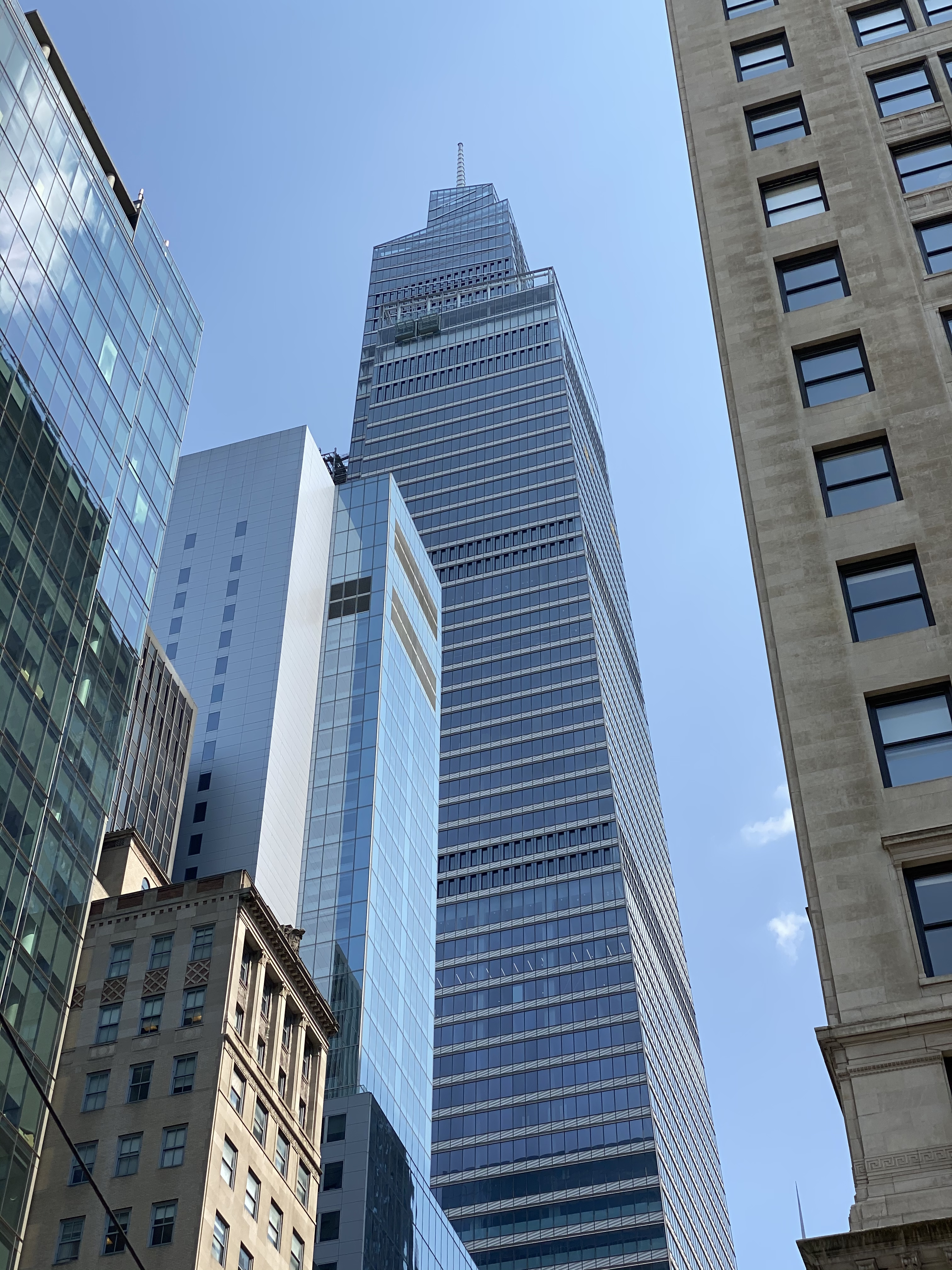
Accordion Headquarters at One Vanderbilt, New York City

In August 2022, Accordion acquired ABACI, an Enterprise Resourcing Planning (ERP) and Enterprise Performance Management (EPM) consultancy. The following month, FFL Partners sold their stake in Accordion to Charlesbank and Motive Partners. In November 2022, Accordion Managing Director and Co-Head of their Western Region Rishi Jain was added to a team of advisors to help guide FTX through Chapter 11.

In May 2023, Accordion acquired Merilytics, a Hyderabad, India–based provider of analytics, data management, and business intelligence services.

In February 2024, Accordion acquired OperationsRx, a Charlotte, North Carolina–based operations and supply chain transformation advisory firm. In addition, in July 2024, Accordion added ToneyKorf Partners, LLC., a turnaround and restructuring firm specializing in management and advisory services to the healthcare industry.

In March 2025, Accordion acquired the Salesforce division of professional services firm Kavaliro.

Additionally in March 2025, the company launched their European operations with the opening of a London office. The expansion marked Accordion’s entry into the European market as a PE focused consulting partner specialized in CFO services. In April of 2025, Accordion acquired A5, a global Salesforce summit partner, to expand its Salesforce capabilities.

== Office locations ==
Accordion is headquartered at One Vanderbilt, in New York City, with offices in Atlanta, Boston, Charlotte, Chicago, Dallas, Detroit, London, Los Angeles, San Francisco, South Florida, they also have an office in Hyderabad, India.
