= Cloqué =

Woven fabric with a blistered surface effect

A cloqué (French for "blister" or "blistered"), occasionally abbreviated clox, is a cloth with a raised woven pattern and a puckered or quilted look. The surface is made up of small irregularly raised figures formed by the woven structure. The Americanized spelling is "cloky".
