= Professor Hoffmann =

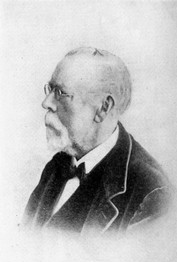
Professor Hoffmann, 1918

Angelo John Lewis, known pseudonymously as Professor Hoffmann (born 1839–1919), was an English-born barrister, illusionist and writer who has been described as "the most prolific and influential magic author and translator until modern times."

== Life ==
Professor Hoffmann was born as Angelo John Lewis in London, England on 23 July 1839. He studied law at Oxford University and became a barrister in London.

During the early 1860s he learned magic from a book and became an amateur magician. Under the pen name Professor Hoffmann, in 1873 he published a series of articles in Routledge's Every Boy's Annual which "launched his career as the most prolific and influential magic author and translator until modern times."

In 1876, Professor Hoffman published Modern Magic to educate the public in how to become a magician, including how to perform sleight of hand tricks, as well as how to dress and speak. Hoffmann's book was successful, allowing him to become a full-time writer. He subsequently published a variety of books and articles, including the children's novel Conjurer Dick and several compendiums of illusions. He also wrote on card games including patience.

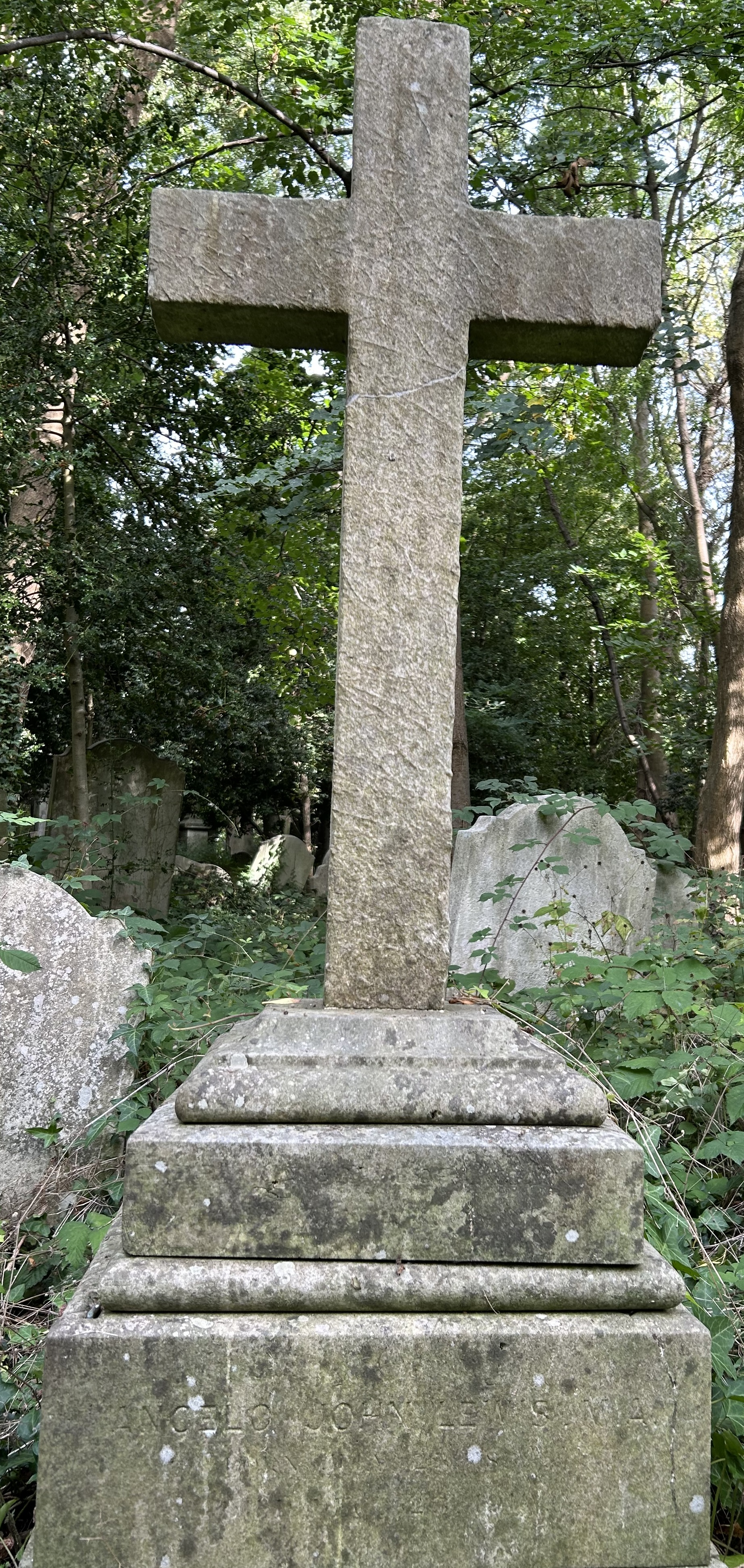
Grave of Angelo John Lewis aka Professor Hoffmann in Highgate Cemetery

He died in December 1919 and was buried on the western side of Highgate Cemetery.

== Works ==
The following is a selection of Hoffmann's works:

- Modern Magic (1876)
- The Cyclopaedia of Card and Table Games. (1891).
- The Illustrated Book of Patience Games. (1892).
- Latest Magic, Being Original Conjuring Tricks [2020 reprint]
- Bridge (1924)
- Selected Patience Games (188?)
- Card Tricks with Apparatus (1892)
- Puzzles Old & New (1893) Frederick Warne
