= Albert Hodges Morehead =

American writer and lexicographer

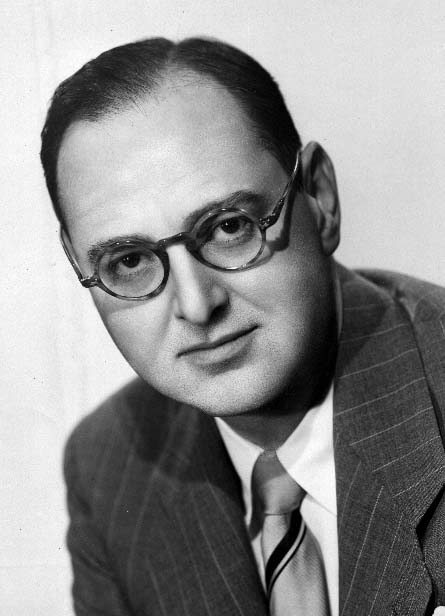
- Morehead c. 1940–1950
- Born: Albert Hodges Morehead, Jr. August 7, 1909; Taylor County, Georgia, US
- Died: October 5, 1966 (aged 57); New York City, US
- Occupations: Encyclopedist, bridge writer
- Spouse: Loy Claudon (m. 1939)
- Children: 2, including Philip David Morehead
- Relatives: Loveman Noa, uncle

Albert Hodges Morehead, Jr. (August 7, 1909 – October 5, 1966) was a writer for The New York Times, a bridge player, a lexicographer, and an author and editor of reference works.

== Early years ==
Morehead was born in Flintstone, Taylor County, Georgia on August 7, 1909, to Albert Hodges Morehead I (1854–1922) and Bianca Noa (1874–1945). Albert senior was a choral conductor. Bianca's brother was Loveman Noa, the Naval hero. Albert's siblings were: Kerenhappuch Turner Morehead (1905–1907) who died as an infant; and James Turner Morehead (1906–1988). His parents lived in Lexington, Kentucky, but were spending their summer in Georgia at the time of his birth. The family moved to Chattanooga, Tennessee, after the death of Albert's father in 1922 in Baylor County, Texas.

He attended the Baylor School and later Harvard University. In 1939, Albert Morehead married Loy Claudon (1910–1970) of Illinois, and the couple had two children: Philip David Morehead (b. 1942) and Andrew Turner Morehead (b. 1940). He was a noted bridge partner of U.S. General Dwight D. Eisenhower.

== Journalism ==
Through high school and college, Morehead worked on the Lexington Herald (now the Herald-Leader), the Chattanooga Times, the Chicago Daily News, The Plain Dealer, and the Town Crier of Newton, Massachusetts. He later worked for The New York Times.

In 1944 he published 36 articles, under four pseudonyms, in Redbook magazine, and in 1951 published 29 articles in Cosmopolitan' magazine. From 1945 to 1947, he was the puzzle and quiz editor for Coronet magazine and was the consulting editor for games in Esquire magazine.

He was author, co-author or editor of over 60 books, including books on games and puzzles, and a number of reference works, some of which are still in print. He edited W. Somerset Maugham's Great Novelists and their Novels (Winston, 1948) and Fulton Oursler's The Greatest Story Ever Told (Doubleday, 1949).

Finally, he served as Vice-president of the John C. Winston Company, a book publisher, for three years.

== Publications ==
- with Culbertson, Ely; Mott-Smith, Geoffrey (1950). Culbertson's Hoyle: The New Encyclopedia of Games, with Official Rules.
- — (1964). Morehead on Bidding (1st ed.). New york: The MacMillan Company. LCCN 63-17309.
- with Frey, Richard L. (1974). Morehead on Bidding (2nd ed.). New York: Simon & Schuster. LCCN 73-21053. SBN 671-21699-6.

== Death ==
Morehead died of cancer in 1966 in Manhattan.

== Bridge accomplishments ==
=== Honors ===
- ACBL Hall of Fame, Blackwood Award 1996
- ACBL Honorary Member of the Year 1946

=== Awards ===
- IBPA Bridge Book of the Year 1966

=== Wins ===
- Schwab Cup (1) 1934

=== Runners-up ===
- North American Bridge Championships (1)
  - Chicago (now Reisinger) (1) 1935

== Literature ==
- Morehead, Albert and Geoffrey Mott-Smith (1950). Culbertson's Hoyle: The New Encyclopedia of Games, with Official Rules. Greystone Press.
