= Solitaire =

Genre of card games

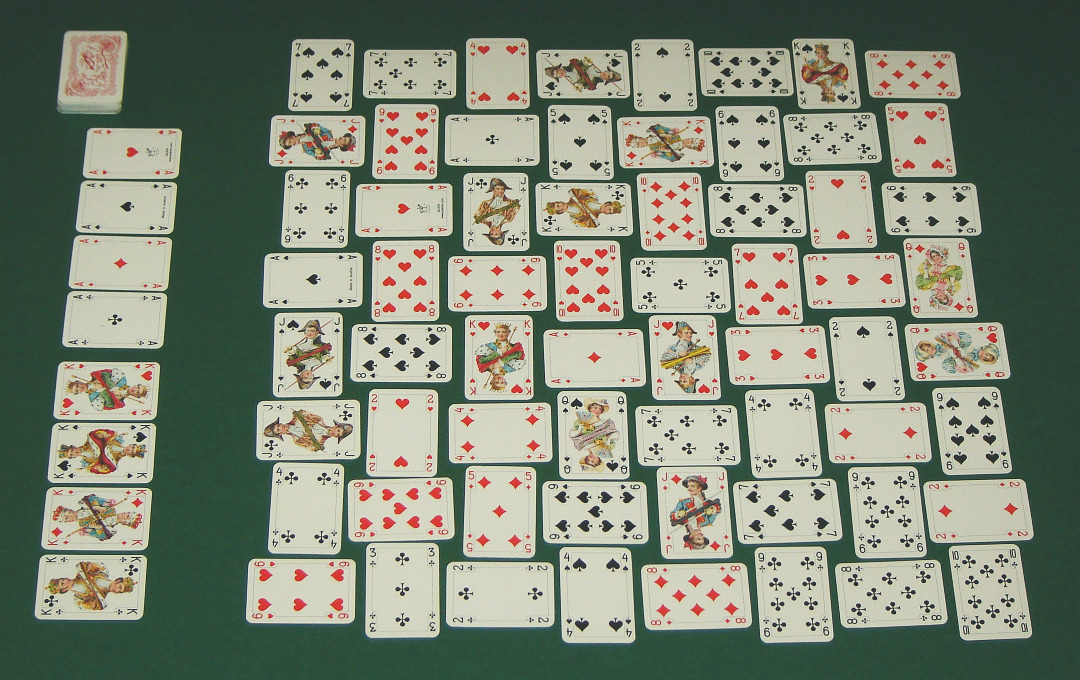
The layout of the game known as Crazy Quilt

Solitaire, patience, or card solitaire refer to a genre of card games whose common feature is that the aim is to arrange the cards in some systematic order or, in a few cases, to pair them off in order to discard them. Most are intended for play by a single player, but there are varieties for two or more players.

== Genre names ==
'Patience' is the earliest recorded name for this type of card game in both British and American sources. The word derives from the games being seen as an exercise in patience.

Although the name solitaire became common in North America for this type of game during the 20th century, British games scholar David Parlett argues that there are good reasons for preferring the name 'patience'. Firstly, patience refers specifically to card games, whereas solitaire may also refer to games played with dominoes or peg and board games. Secondly, any game of patience may be played competitively by two or more players.

American games authors Wood and Goddard state that "Patience is any game played with playing cards in which the object is to arrange the cards... in some systematic order." They note that "there are excellent games of Patience for two or more players; but most... are designed for one player" and that "Solitaire...properly applies to any game that one player can play alone." In practice, in North America the name 'solitaire' is often used totum pro parte to refer to single-player card games, although sometimes the term 'card solitaire' is used for clarity. Meanwhile, in other countries 'solitaire' specifically refers to one-player board and table games, especially peg solitaire and marble solitaire. Solitaire is often used worldwide just to refer to the game of Klondike. Authors writing internationally tend to include both "patience" and "solitaire" in the title, but sometimes the phrase "card games for one" is used instead.

== Individual game names ==
The earliest English and American sources tended to use the definite article before the names of games e.g. "The Beleaguered Castle", "The Clock", "The Gathering of the Clans", "The House on the Hill", etc. The word "solitaire" or "patience" was also often appended to names, e.g. "The Baroness Patience", "Czarina Patience", "Gateway Solitaire", "Missing Link Solitaire", etc. These tendencies have largely been dropped in modern sources, especially where books are aimed at a worldwide market. However, in a few instances they are sometimes retained, for example, where the name is an adjective, e.g. "The Blind Patience"; or the definite article seems more evocative or meaningful, e.g. "The Plot". American sources sometimes change the names of games where the title has a European theme; for example, "British Constitution" is referred to as simply "Constitution", and "Duchess of Luynes" is referred to as "Grand Duchess". (Note: See e.g. Parlett (1979) and Morehead & Mott-Smith (2011).)

== History ==
Solitaire is probably of German or Scandinavian origin, the earliest records appearing in there in the late 1700s and early 1800s. The game became popular in France in the early 19th century, reaching Britain and America in the latter half. The earliest known description of a game of solitaire appeared in the 1783 edition of the German game anthology Das neue Königliche L'Hombre-Spiel, where it is called Patience and describes a game between two players playing alternately. Before this, there were no literary mentions of such games in large game compendia such as Charles Cotton's The Compleat Gamester (1674) and Abbé Bellecour's Academie des Jeux (1674). Books were also reported to appear in Sweden and Russia in the early 1800s and the earliest book of solitaires was published in Russia in 1826. More followed, especially in Sweden. There are additional references to solitaire in French literature.

Solitaire was first mentioned in literature shortly after cartomantic layouts were developed circa 1765, suggesting a connection between the two. This theory is supported by the name of the game in Danish and Norwegian, kabal(e). An 1895 account describes a variant of the game exclusively used for cartomancy.

The first collection of solitaires in the English language is often attributed to Lady Adelaide Cadogan through her Illustrated Games of Patience, published in about 1870 and reprinted several times. (Note: Cadogan's 2nd edition is dated 1874.) However, a lost book called Patience by 'Perseverance', a pseudonym for William Henry Cremer, was published in London in 1860 and is listed in bibliographies.

The earliest American treatise is Patience: A Series of Games with Cards by Ednah Dow Littlehale Cheney (1869), which was followed in 1870 by Patience: A Series of Thirty Games with Cards, and later Dick's Games of Patience (1883).

More books on solitaire were written towards the end of the 19th century and into the early 20th century. The most prolific and original author was Mary Whitmore Jones whose first book, Games of Patience for One or More Players, appeared in 1888 and was followed by four more volumes by 1900 and another two entitled New Games of Patience by 1911. Together her works contain around 250 different games. Other authors of books on solitaire included H. E. Jones (a.k.a. Cavendish), Angelo Lewis (a.k.a. Professor Hoffmann), Basil Dalton, Ernest Bergholt and "Tarbart".

== Overview ==
Solitaires are usually intended for a single player, although a small number have been designed for two and, in rare cases, three or even four players. They are games of skill or chance or a combination of the two. There are three classes of solitaire grouped by aim or object.

- Building sequences. The most common involves building cards in sequences, usually by suit. The cards of a shuffled pack are dealt into a prescribed layout on a tabletop. Cards are then moved and placed so as to eventually arrange them in ascending (e.g. Ace to King) or descending sequence. Occasionally both are aimed at in the same game. The card starting the required sequence is known as the foundation card or base card and the sequence or family is said to be built upon this card. In some cases, foundation cards are placed in position at the start; in others they are only laid down as they come to hand during the course of play. In some instances the cards of the sequence must be of the same suit as the foundation card; in others, suit is disregarded. Some games permit the temporary creation of auxiliary sequences (descending or ascending), i.e. groups of cards in succession but not yet ready to be played to the families or sequences on the foundations.
- Pairing. A second object of many solitaires is to pair cards and then discard them. If the player is able to throw out all the cards in this way, the game is out, i.e. won.
- Totalling. A third object is to discard any two cards whose combined value forms a particular total, say eleven or thirteen; the game is out if the player can get rid of all the cards this way.

It will be obvious that the endeavour to arrange, pair, or combine the cards of a whole pack is a difficult task, varying in degree according to the rules of the particular game. The player must therefore be prepared for a good many failures, sometimes when they have all but reached the goal of success. Hence why the name 'patience games' has been given to recreations of this description.

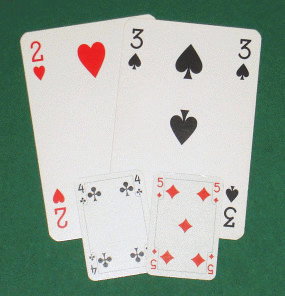
Patience-sized playing cards (bottom) are smaller than regular playing cards (top); this is because a game where cards are laid out may take up a large amount of table space

== Card size and format ==
The cards are normally smaller than standard cards measuring about 67 x 42 mm. However, packs labelled 'Patience' have also been produced in standard size (c. 88 x 58 mm) and are also marketed as mini-patience cards at 54 x 36 mm. Even smaller cards have been produced for at least a century and measuring about 45 x 32 mm. They are frequently sold as twin packs in a single box, since many patiences and solitaires require two full decks of cards. The two packs may have different back designs which does not affect the play.

== Types ==
Solitaires may be grouped together in various ways as follows:

- By aim or object (building, pairing or totalling) - see above
- By family under their progenitor or best known variant e.g. Klondike or Napoleon at St Helena
- By starting information (closed, open, or half-open) and mechanism (building or packing, etc.) - see below

Most patience or solitaire games involve building sequences of cards in suit in order in a family running from ace to king. Normally the ace is the base card or foundation on which a two of the same suit is placed, followed by a three and so on. This is building and all such games are, technically, builders. However, in many, the cards must be assembled in reverse order on that part of the layout called the tableau. They can then be built in the right sequence on the foundations. This intermediate step of reverse building is called packing, and games using this technique are called "packers". Games that use neither technique are "non-builders". There are also special kinds of packer known as 'blockades', 'planners' and 'spiders'.

These games may be classified by the degree to which the cards are revealed. In "open games", all the cards are visible throughout the game and the player has to use powers of analysis to solve the solitaire. In "closed" games, cards are drawn from a face-down stock and the player has to use judgement because the sequence of cards is unknown until they appear. In between is a hybrid group which David Parlett calls "half-open".

=== Closed games ===
Closed games are those in which, throughout the game, not all the cards are visible. They require more judgment because the sequence of cards is unknown. As cards appear, if they cannot be played straight away they are put into a wastepile from which they may, potentially, not be accessible again. Closed games are subdivided as follows:

- Simple builders. Typically the aim of a simple builder is to build cards in suit sequence on the Aces which form the foundations. They are 'simple' in that the player has little or no choice in playing and just needs to watch for opportunities to build, any card that cannot be built being discarded to a wastepile where it may, of course, become inaccessible. Cards may be played from the wastepile or the hand and when the hand cards are exhausted it may be possible to 'redeal' by playing through the wastepile, usually for a limited number of times.
- Reserved builders. An elaboration of the simple builder is to deal a number of cards to a 'reserve', thus increasing the number of cards available to play.
- Simple packers. Packers enable cards to be built in reverse sequences on the layout - sometimes called 'auxiliary sequences', before playing them to the foundations in the correct sequence. Building in reverse sequence is known as 'packing'.
- Reserved packers Reserved packers combine the features of having a reserve of cards and also the ability to pack in reverse sequence before laying off to the foundations.
- Non-builders The aim of a non-builder is not to build suit sequences, but some other objective. In many of them the aim is to discard the entire pack or packs by pairing cards of the same rank or adding up to a given number.

=== Open games ===
In open games, the entire pack of cards is visible at the outset and continue to be visible throughout the game. Games of perfect information, like chess, require careful analysis to achieve success. Open games may be divided into:

- Open builders. A family of builders in which all the cards are faced at the start of play.
- Open packers. Likewise a family of packers in which all the cards are visible at the outset.
- Open non-builders. A branch of open solitaires in which the aim is other than build suit sequences.

=== Half-open games ===
Half-open games are those which start 'closed' and become 'open' as the game progresses. They may be divided as follows:

- Half-open builders. These are games where the aim is to build up suit sequences without the help of packing in reverse order first. Unlike simple builders, there is no wastepile, but cards are added to the layout if they cannot be built until the game reaches a point where all the unbuilt cards are visible and the game becomes one of analysis.
- Blockades. A small family of builders named after British Blockade in which the cards are only available if there is no card below (or sometimes above) it.
- Planners. A large family of builders with a high skill level. Cards are played to the foundations or to several wastepiles, the top cards of which are always available to play.
- Half-open packers. These are packers where, during the course of the game, all the remaining cards eventually become visible.
- Spiders. A small family of games named after Spider in which all the building takes place on the tableau and not to separate foundations.

=== Competitive solitaires ===
Competitive solitaires are games of a solitaire character that are not played solitarily, but by two or more players in competition with each other. The earliest ones go back to the late 19th century. Examples include Conjugal Patience, cribbage solitaire, Pirate, Progressive Patience, Racing Demon, Russian Bank, Spit and Spite and Malice.

== Computer games ==
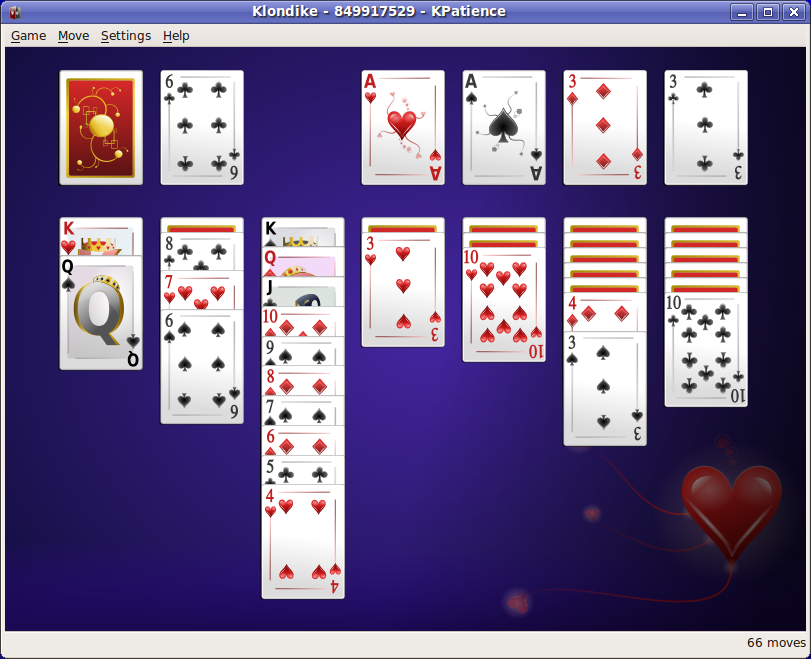
Klondike, often simply called "Solitaire" by software producers.

Solitaire games have enjoyed a renaissance as a result of being readily transferable to a software format and playable on computers or other electronic media. Microsoft Solitaire, an implementation of Klondike, has been included with most versions of Windows from 1990 onwards, and has had a major impact in popularizing solitaire games with the general public. A plethora of electronic versions of these games have been produced, some, like "Solitaire" under proprietary names different from the actual name.

Mahjong solitaire is a computer variant notable for using mahjong tiles instead of playing cards.

== See also ==
- List of patience and solitaire games
- Glossary of patience and solitaire terms
- Patience sorting, a computer algorithm named after the card game genre

== Bibliography ==
- Arnold, Peter. Card Games for One. London: Hamlyn, 2002 (ISBN 0-600-60727-5)
- Arnold, Peter. The Complete Book of Card Games. Hamlyn Publishing, 2010. ISBN 978-0-600-62191-1
- Bergholt, Ernest (1941). A New Book of Patience Games. Routledge.
- Blanccoeur, Comtesse de (1860–70). Le Livre Illustré des Patiences. Brussels.
- Cadogan, Lady Adelaide (1870). Illustrated Games of Patience.
- Cavendish (= Henry Jones) (1890). Patience. De La Rue.
- Craze, Richard. The Playing Card Kit. Simon & Schuster, 1995. ISBN 0-7318-0526-7
- Cremer, William Henry (1860). Patience by 'Perseverance'. London: E. C. Spurin.
- Crépeau, Pierre. The Complete Book of Solitaire (a translation of Le Grand Livre des Patiences). Willowdale, Ontario: Firefly Books, 2001. (ISBN 1-55209-597-5)
- Dalton, Basil (1948). The Complete Patience Book. John Baker.
- Harbin, Robert (1972). Waddington's Family Card Games. Pan, London.
- Hoffmann, Professor (= Angelo Lewis) (1920). Illustrated Book of Patience Games. Routledge. English translation of Blanccoeur.
- Kansil, Joli Quentin (ed). Bicycle Official Rules of Card Games. 1999. ISBN 1-889752-06-1
- Lee, Sloane & Packard, Gabriel. 100 Best Solitaire Games: 100 Ways to Entertain Yourself with a Deck of Cards; New York, N. Y.: Cardoza Publishing, 2004. (ISBN 1-58042-115-6)
- Marks, Arnold & Harrod, Jacqueline. Card Games Made Easy. Surrey, England: Clarion, 1997 (ISBN 1-899606-17-3)
- Morehead, Albert and Geoffrey Mott-Smith (1950). The Complete Book of Patience. Faber & Faber.
- Morehead, Albert H. and Geoffrey Mott-Smith. The Complete Book of Solitaire and Patience Games. New York: Bantam Books, 1977 (ISBN 0-553-26240-8)
- Morehead, Philip D. Hoyle's Rules of Games (3rd edition) 2001. ISBN 0-451-20484-0
- Parlett, David (1991). A History of Card Games. Oxford: OUP. ISBN 0-19-282905-X..
- Parlett, David (1979). The Penguin Book of Patience. London: Penguin. ISBN 0-7139-1193-X.
- Parlett, David (1987). The Penguin Book of Card Games, Treasure Press, 1987. ISBN 1-85051-221-3
- Parlett, David (2008). The Penguin Book of Card Games, London, New York: Penguin. ISBN 978-0-141-03787-5
- Phillips, Hubert (1960). The Pan Book of Card Games. Pan, London.
- Whitmore Jones, Mary. Games of Patience, Series 1-5 (1899) – New Patience Games of Patience (1911), Upcott Gill, London.
- The Little Book of Solitaire, Running Press, 2002. ISBN 0-7624-1381-6
