= Svoyi Koziri =

Russian card game

- Origin: Russia
- Family: Matching
- Players: 2
- Skills: Calculation
- Cards: 24 or 32
- Deck: French
- Playing time: 50 min.
- Chance: Difficult

Related games
- Cribbage, noddy

Svoyi Koziri, also known as Svoi Kozyri or Vsyak svoi kozyri (Russian: свои козыри; "one's own trumps"), is a Russian going-out card game for two players which some consider an elaboration of the Czech game Sedma. This game is one of perfect information and hence entirely of foresight and calculation. It differs from almost all other card games, in that the element of luck is eliminated, as, at any one time in the game, a player will know exactly which cards his opponent has.

It was first published in the Pan Book of Card Games under the name "Challenge" in 1960, by Hubert Phillips, and said to have been brought to England by Prof. Abram Samoilovitch Besicovitch while teaching at the University of Cambridge in 1927.

== The game ==
The game may be played with a number of cards multiple of four, ranking A K Q J T 9 8...in each suit. Phillips regarded 32 as standard, but it can be played without the 7s or 8s (recommended for beginners), or, for more advanced players, with the 6s and 5s included (e.g.: a deck of 24 cards with the 7s and 8s omitted).

To begin with, the dealer chooses any 2 suits, and chooses one of them as his trumps. The other player chooses 1 of the other remaining suits as his trump card. (the dealer has chosen ♠ ♣, and ♠ as his trump. The other player has chosen ♥ ♦, and ♦ as his trump).

=== The deal ===
The dealer now deals half of the available cards to himself face up in a row, extracts from them those of his own suits, and places the ♦s and ♥s back in the pack. They may have dealt:

North
K Q J ♠, J 10 9 ♣ (plus the ♦s and ♥s he put back in the pile)

- The other player must now find and take exactly the same cards in the suits of ♦ ♥ for themself. They will then have:

South
K Q J ♦, J 10 9 ♥

- The dealer must take all the remaining ♦s and ♥s, and the other player all the remaining ♠s and ♣s, so that both players have:

North
K Q J ♠, J 10 9 ♣, A 10 9 ♦, A K Q ♥

South
K Q J ♥, J 10 9 ♦, A K Q ♣, A 9 10 ♠

=== The play ===
The rules of the game are much like whist.
The dealer places down a card on the table (e.g. 10 ♣), then the other player must:

- Play a "better card" (e.g.: Q ♣)
- Play one of their trump cards, ignoring the value of the cards so far played (e.g.: ♦9).

A "better card" is a higher one of the same suit as the one led, or any other card of one's personal trump (if different from the suit led). Any card may be led at each turn, that is, no need to be related in any way to the previous card.

The winner of that round then plays the next card, followed by his opponent's card. Then the winner of this round goes on to play the next card, and so on so forth. Should a player not be able to follow either of these rules, they must take all of the cards on the table into his hand. The game ends when one player has managed to get rid of his cards.
