= Cribbage statistics =

In cribbage, the probability and maximum and minimum score of each type of hand can be computed.

== Distinct hands ==
- There are 12,994,800 possible hands in Cribbage: 52 choose 4 for the hand, and any one of the 48 left as the starter card.

${52 \choose 4} \times 48 = 12,994,800$

- Another, and perhaps more intuitive way of looking at it, is to say that there are 52 choose 5 different 5-card hands, and any one of those 5 could be the turn-up, or starter card.
  Therefore, the calculation becomes:

${52 \choose 5} \times 5 = 12,994,800$

- 1,009,008 (approximately 7.8%) of these score zero points, or 1,022,208 if the hand is the crib, as the starter must be the same suit as the crib's four cards for a flush.
- Not accounting for suit, there are 14,715 unique hands.

== Maximum scores ==
- The highest score for one hand is 29: 555J in hand with the starter 5 of the same suit as the Jack (8 points for four J-5 combinations, 8 points for four 5-5-5 combinations, 12 points for pairs of 5s and one for the nob). There is also the “Dealer’s 30” (28 for 5-5-5-5 in the hand and a Jack as the starter; the dealer would also take 2 for cutting the Jack to make 30).
- The second highest score is 28 (hand and starter together comprise any ten-point card plus all four 5s, apart from the 29-point hand above).
- The third highest score is 24 (A7777, 33339, 36666, 44447, 44556, 44566, 45566, 67788 or 77889); 24 is the maximum score for any card combination without a 2 or a ten-card, except for the above examples with four 5s.
- The maximum score for any hand containing a 2 is 20; either 22229 or 26778 if the latter is a four-card flush.
- The highest score as a dealer from the hand and crib is 53. The starter must be a 5, the hand must be J555, with the Jack suit matching the starter (score 29), and the crib must be 4466 (score 24), or vice versa.
- The highest number of points possible (excluding pegging points) in one round is 77. The dealer must score 53, the opponent must then have the other 4466 making another 24 point hand for a total of 77.
- The highest number of points from a hand that has a potential to be a "19 hand" is 15. It is a crib hand of one suit, 46J and another ten card, with a 5 of that suit cut up. The points are 15 for 6, a run for 9, nobs for 10, and a flush for 15. Any of the following cards in an unlike suit yields a "19 hand"; 2, 3, 7, 8, and an unpaired ten card.
- The most points that can be pegged by playing one card is 15, by completing a double pair royal on the last card and making the count 15: 12 for double pair royal (four-of-a-kind), 2 for the 15, and 1 for the last card. This can happen in two ways in a two-player game. The non-dealer must have two ten-value cards and two 2s, and the dealer must have one ten-value card and 722, in which case the play must go: 10-10-10-go; 7-2-2-2-2. For example:

Alice (dealer)	10 of spades 7 of diamonds 2 of diamonds 2 of clubs
Bob	2 of spades Jack of hearts 2 of hearts Queen of clubs

Player	Card	Cumulative	Score	Announced
Bob	Jack of hearts	10		"ten"
Alice	10 of spades	20		"twenty"
Bob	Queen of clubs	30	3 points (run)	"thirty for three"
Alice			1 point to Bob (30 for one)	"go"
Alice	7 of diamonds	7		"seven"
Bob	2 of hearts	9		"nine"
Alice	2 of diamonds	11	2 points	"eleven for two"
Bob	2 of spades	13	6 points	"thirteen for six"
Alice	2 of clubs	15	15 points (double pair royal, fifteen, last card)	"fifteen for fifteen"

- Alternatively, the players can each have two deuces, with one also holding A-4 and the other two aces. Then play might go 4-A-A-A-2-2-2-2.
- The maximum number of points that can be scored in a single deal by the dealer in a two player game is 78 (pegging + hand + crib):
  Non-dealer is dealt 3 3 4 4 5 J and Dealer is dealt 3 3 4 4 5 5. Non-dealer discards J 5 to the crib (as ill-advised as this may be). Dealer discards 5 5 to the crib. Note that the J is suited to the remaining 5. The remaining 5 is cut.
  Play is 3 3 3 3 4 4 4 4 go. The dealer scores 29 total peg points.
  The dealer's hand is 3 3 4 4 5 = 20
  The dealer's crib is J(nobs) 5 5 5 5 = 29
  The total score for the dealer is 29 + 20 + 29 = 78.
  Note that the correct play for both players is to keep 3 3 4 5 worth 10 points and discarding J 4 and 4 5 to the crib respectively, meaning in reality, this hand would never take place. A more realistic hand would be both players being dealt 3 3 4 4 J J with both discarding J J and a 5 cut. In this case, with pegging as described above, the total score would be 20 (hand) + 21 (crib) + 29 (pegging) = 70 points.
- The maximum number of points that can be scored in a single deal by the non-dealer in a two player game is 48 (pegging + hand), with the following example :
  Non-dealer is dealt 5 5 4 4 crib crib and Dealer is dealt 4 4 5 9 crib crib. Cut card is a 6.
  Play is 5 5 5 4 4 4 4, with the Non-dealer pegging 24. The Non-dealer scores 24 in the hand for a total of 48 points.
- The maximum number of points that can be scored with a four-card flush is 21, which is achieved with a hand of 5 5 10 J Q or 5 5 J Q K: a pair, six fifteens, a three-card sequence, and the flush. A five-card flush of 5 10 J Q K scores 18 if the Jack is not the starter.
- The maximum combined pegging score in a 2 player game is 44 points. Both dealer and non dealer have two sevens and two fives. Non dealer plays 7, dealer plays 7 for 2 points on pair, non dealer plays 7 for 3 of a kind for 6 points making 8 total now, dealer then plays 7 for 4 of a kind getting 12 points now making 20 points total, and a 5 can't be played on 28 surpassing 31, so dealer gets an additional go point of 1 now for 21 points total in 1st round of pegging combined score. Non dealer plays 5, dealer then plays 5 to make pair for 2 points, non dealer plays 5 for 3 of a kind and 15 to get 8 points now making 10 points, then dealer plays five for 4 of a kind getting 12 points and the go making 13 points, added to the 10 points to make 23 points in the second pegging round. 21 points in the 1st pegging round plus 23 points in the 2nd round of pegging makes for a total of a combined 44 points.

== Minimum scores ==
- The dealer in two-player, 6-card cribbage will always peg at least one point during the play (the pegging round), unless the opponent wins the game before the pegging is finished. If non-dealer is able to play at each turn then dealer must score at least one for "last"; if not, then dealer scores at least one for "go".
- While 19 is generally recognized as "the impossible hand", meaning that there is no combination of 5 cards that will produce a score of 19 points, scores of 25, 26, 27, and greater than 29 are also impossible in-hand point totals. Sometimes if a player scores 0 points in their hand they will claim they have a "19-point hand."

=== Minimum while holding a 5 ===
If a player holds a 5 in their hand, that player is guaranteed at least two points, as shown below:

A 0-point hand must have five distinct cards without forming a run or a fifteen combination. If such a hand includes a 5, it cannot hold a 10 or a face card. It also cannot include both an A and a 9; both a 2 and an 8; both a 3 and a 7; or both a 4 and a 6. Since four more cards are needed, exactly one must be taken from each of those sets. Let us run through the possible choices:

- If the hand includes a 9, it cannot hold a 6, so it must hold a 4. Having both a 4 and a 9, it cannot hold a 2, so it must hold an 8. Holding both a 4 and an 8, it cannot hold a 3, so it must hold a 7. But now the hand includes a 7-8 fifteen, which is a contradiction.
- Therefore, the hand must include an A.
  - If the hand includes a 7, it now cannot contain an 8, as that would form a 7-8 fifteen. However it cannot hold a 2, as that would form a 7-5-2-A fifteen. This is a contradiction.
  - Therefore, the hand must include a 3. Either a 2 or a 4 would complete a run, so the hand must therefore include a 6 and an 8. But this now forms an 8-6-A fifteen, which is a contradiction.

Therefore, every set of five cards including a 5 has a pair, a run, or a fifteen, and thus at least two points.

Interestingly, a hand with two 5s also can score at least two points; an example is 2 5 5 7 9, which would be most likely a crib hand, and would not score a flush because of the pair, although said hand can be a non-crib four-card flush if either 5 is the starter. A hand with three 5s scores at least eight points; a hand with all four 5s scores 20 points and is improved only with a 10, J, Q, or K (scoring 28 except for the 29 hand previously described.)

It is also true that holding both a 2 and a 3, or an A and a 4 (pairs of cards adding up to five) also guarantees a non-zero score:

- If a hand includes both a 2 and a 3 and is to score 0 points, it cannot have a face card, an A, a 4, or a 5. This requires three cards from the 6, 7, 8, and 9, and any such selection will include a fifteen.
- If a hand includes both an A and a 4 and is to score 0 points, it cannot have a face card or a 5. It also cannot have both a 2 and a 3; both a 6 and a 9; or both a 7 and an 8. If the hand includes a 2, it cannot have a 9 (9-4-2 fifteen). Thus it must have a 6. It then cannot have an 8 (8-4-2-A fifteen) or a 7 (7-6-2 fifteen). If, however, the hand includes a 3, it cannot include an 8 (8-4-3 fifteen) or a 7 (7-4-3-A fifteen). These are all contradictions, so every hand containing both an A and a 4 scores at least two points.

== Odds ==
- The table below assumes the card(s) discarded to the crib are randomly chosen. Given this assumption, the odds of getting a 28 hand in a two-player game are about 1 in 170,984, and a perfect 29 hand 1 in 3,248,700.
- However, if we assume that the player will always keep J555 if those cards are included in the hand, the odds of getting a perfect 29 hand starting with a six-card hand are 1 in 216,580, while the odds after discarding from a five-card hand are 1 in 649,740.

Scoring Breakdown, assuming random discard(s) to the crib

Score	Number of hands (out of 12,994,800)	Percentage of hands	Percentage of hands at least as high
0	1,009,008	7.7647	100
1	99,792	0.7679	92.2353
2	2,813,796	21.6532	91.4674
3	505,008	3.8862	69.8142
4	2,855,676	21.9755	65.928
5	697,508	5.3676	43.9525
6	1,800,268	13.8538	38.5849
7	751,324	5.7817	24.7311
8	1,137,236	8.7515	18.9494
9	361,224	2.7798	10.1979
10	388,740	2.9915	7.4181
11	51,680	0.3977	4.4266
12	317,340	2.4421	4.0289
13	19,656	0.1513	1.5868
14	90,100	0.6934	1.4355
15	9,168	0.0706	0.7421
16	58,248	0.4482	0.6715
17	11,196	0.0862	0.2233
18	2,708	0.0208	0.1371
19	0	0	0.1163
20	8,068	0.0621	0.1163
21	2,496	0.0192	0.0542
22	444	0.0034	0.0350
23	356	0.0027	0.0316
24	3,680	0.0283	0.0289
25	0	0	0.0006
26	0	0	0.0006
27	0	0	0.0006
28	76	0.0006	0.0006
29	4	0.00003	0.00003

- Mean = 4.7692
- Standard deviation = 3.1254
- Skewness = 0.9039
- Excess kurtosis = 1.4599

Note that these statistics do not reflect frequency of occurrence in 5 or 6-card play. For 6-card play the mean for non-dealer is 7.8580 with standard deviation 3.7996, and for dealer is 7.7981 and 3.9082 respectively. The means are higher because the player can choose those four cards that maximize their point holdings. For 5-card play the mean is about 5.4.

Slightly different scoring rules apply in the crib - only 5-point flushes are counted, in other words you need to flush all cards including the turn-up and not just the cards in the crib. Because of this, a slightly different distribution is observed:

Scoring Breakdown (crib/box hands only)

Score	Number of hands (+/- change from non-crib distribution) (out of 12,994,800)	Percentage of hands	Percentage of hands at least as high
0	1,022,208 (+13,200)	7.8663	100
1	99,792 (0)	0.7679	92.1337
2	2,839,800 (+26,004)	21.8534	91.3658
3	508,908 (+3,900)	3.9162	69.5124
4	2,868,960 (+13,284)	22.0778	65.5962
5	703,496 (+5,988)	5.4137	43.5184
6	1,787,176 (-13,092)	13.7530	38.1047
7	755,320 (+3,996)	5.8125	24.3517
8	1,118,336 (-18,900)	8.6060	18.5393
9	358,368 (-2,856)	2.7578	9.9332
10	378,240 (-10,500)	2.9107	7.1755
11	43,880 (-7,800)	0.3377	4.2648
12	310,956 (-6,384)	2.3929	3.9271
13	16,548 (-3,108)	0.1273	1.5342
14	88,132 (-1,968)	0.6782	1.4068
15	9,072 (-96)	0.0698	0.7286
16	57,288 (-960)	0.4409	0.6588
17	11,196 (0)	0.0862	0.2179
18	2,264 (-444)	0.0174	0.1318
19	0 (0)	0	0.1144
20	7,828 (-240)	0.0602	0.1144
21	2,472 (-24)	0.0190	0.0541
22	444 (0)	0.0034	0.0351
23	356 (0)	0.0027	0.0317
24	3,680 (0)	0.0283	0.0289
25	0 (0)	0	0.0006
26	0 (0)	0	0.0006
27	0 (0)	0	0.0006
28	76 (0)	0.0006	0.0006
29	4 (0)	0.00003	0.00003

- Mean = 4.7348

As above, these statistics do not reflect the true distributions in 5 or 6 card play, since both the dealer and non-dealer will discard tactically in order to maximise or minimise the possible score in the crib/box.

== Card combinations ==
- A hand of four aces (AAAA) is the only combination of cards wherein no flip card will add points to its score.
- There are 71 distinct combinations of card values that add to 15:

Two cards	Three cards			Four cards				Five cards			
X5; 96; 87	X4A; X32; 95A; 942; 933	86A; 852; 843; 77A; 762	753; 744; 663; 654; 555	X3AA; X22A; 94AA; 932A; 9222; 85AA	842A; 833A; 8322; 76AA; 752A; 743A	7422; 7332; 662A; 653A; 6522; 644A	6432; 6333; 554A; 5532; 5442; 5433; 4443	X2AAA; 93AAA; 922AA; 84AAA; 832AA; 8222A; 75AAA	742AA; 733AA; 7322A; 72222; 66AAA; 652AA; 643AA	6422A; 6332A; 63222; 553AA; 5522A; 544AA; 5432A	54222; 5333A; 53322; 4442A; 4433A; 44322; 43332
Note: "X" indicates a card scoring ten: 10, J, Q or K

== Hand plus Crib statistics ==
If both the hand and the crib are considered as a sum (and both are drawn at random, rather than formed with strategy as is realistic in an actual game setting) there are 2,317,817,502,000 (2.3 trillion) 9-card combinations. ${52 \choose 4} \times {48 \choose 4} \times 44 = 2,317,817,502,000$

- As stated above, the highest score a dealer can get with both hand and crib considered is 53.
- The only point total between 0 and 53 that is not possible is 51.

Scoring Breakdown

Score	Number of hand-crib pairs (out of 2,317,817,502,000)	Percentage of hand-crib pairs to 6 decimal places	Percentage of hand-crib pairs at least as high
0	14,485,964,652	0.624983	100
1	3,051,673,908	0.131662	99.375017
2	80,817,415,668	3.486789	99.243356
3	23,841,719,688	1.028628	95.756566
4	190,673,505,252	8.226424	94.727938
5	70,259,798,952	3.031291	86.501514
6	272,593,879,188	11.7608	83.470222
7	121,216,281,624	5.22976	71.709422
8	290,363,331,432	12.527446	66.479663
9	151,373,250,780	6.530853	53.952217
10	254,052,348,948	10.960843	47.421364
11	141,184,445,960	6.091267	36.460521
12	189,253,151,324	8.165145	30.369254
13	98,997,926,340	4.27117	22.204109
14	127,164,095,564	5.486372	17.932939
15	59,538,803,512	2.568744	12.446567
16	77,975,659,056	3.364185	9.877823
17	32,518,272,336	1.402969	6.513638
18	42,557,293,000	1.836093	5.110669
19	17,654,681,828	0.761694	3.274576
20	22,185,433,540	0.957169	2.512881
21	8,921,801,484	0.384923	1.555712
22	10,221,882,860	0.441013	1.17079
23	4,016,457,976	0.173286	0.729776
24	5,274,255,192	0.227553	0.55649
25	1,810,154,696	0.078097	0.328938
26	2,305,738,180	0.099479	0.25084
27	750,132,024	0.032364	0.151361
28	1,215,878,408	0.052458	0.118998
29	401,018,276	0.017302	0.06654
30	475,531,940	0.020516	0.049238
31	184,802,724	0.007973	0.028722
32	233,229,784	0.010062	0.020749
33	82,033,028	0.003539	0.010686
34	71,371,352	0.003079	0.007147
35	19,022,588	0.000821	0.004068
36	44,459,120	0.001918	0.003247
37	9,562,040	0.000413	0.001329
38	10,129,244	0.000437	0.000916
39	1,633,612	0.00007	0.000479
40	5,976,164	0.000258	0.000409
41	1,517,428	0.000065	0.000151
42	600,992	0.000026	0.000085
43	127,616	0.000006	0.00006
44	832,724	0.000036	0.000054
45	222,220	0.00001	0.000018
46	42,560	0.000002	0.000009
47	24,352	0.000001	0.000007
48	119,704	0.000005	0.000006
49	6,168	0	0
50	384	0	0
51	0	0	0
52	4,320	0	0
53	288	0	0

- Mean: 9.50397
- Median: 9
- Mode: 8

== See also ==
- Cribbage (rules)
