= Noddy (card game) =

16th-century English card game

- Cribbage without the crib
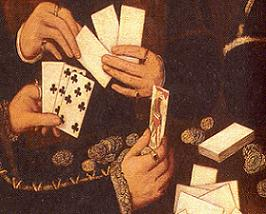
- Origin: England
- Family: Matching
- Players: 2-4
- Skills: Calculation
- Cards: 52
- Deck: English
- Playing time: 30 min.
- Chance: Medium

Related games
- Cribbage • Costly Colours

Noddy (O.F. naudin) also noddie, nodde or knave noddy, is a 16th-century English card game, ancestor of cribbage. It is the oldest identifiable card game with this gaming structure and thus probably also ancestral to the more complicated 17th-century game of costly colours.

== History ==
The earliest reference to the game of Noddy in the Oxford English Dictionary dates from 1589. The basic term noddy, means a fool or simpleton, but in the gaming sense, it is just the name given to the knave of the suit turned up at the start of play.

A description of the game can be found in Randle Holme's The Academy of Armory, written in 1688, which displays previously unrecorded scoring features and terminology.

== Cribbage without the crib ==
Noddy can be thought of as the "small cribbage without the crib", i.e without the set of cards discarded by each player to form an extra hand for the dealer in cribbage, called the crib.But it would seem that the game of noddy was played for counters, and that it was fifteen or twenty-one up, as quoted by Shirley. In a play of Middleton's, Christmas, speaking of the sports of that time as children, says that the game was played for thirty one. And in Salton's Tales the game was depicted as being played for twenty one. It is probable, however, that it was played all the three ways, as 15, 21 and 31 points at the choice of the players.

Edmund Gayton (Festivous Notes upon Don Quixot, 1654) speaks of noddy boards, but Robert Nares in A Glossary: or Collection of words, phrases, names and allusions to customs, proverbs, &c (1822) says that Noddy was not played with a board.

== Gameplay ==
Noddy is a game for two or four players – the latter presumably partners – receiving each 3 cards from a 52-card pack ranking from ace (low) to king (high). The object of the game is to peg points for making combinations both in the hand and in the play up to 31 over as many deals as it takes. A23 is a valid sequence, but AKQ isn't. Whoever cuts the lower card deals first.

== Combinations ==
- Knave noddy – jack of the trump suit: 1 (or 2 to non-dealer if it's turned up)
- Point-counts
  - Fifteen (two or more cards totalling 15): 1 per card
  - Twenty-five (three or more cards totalling 25): 1 per card
  - Thirty-one, or 'Hitter' (four or more cards totalling 31): 1 per card
- Pairs
  - Pair (two cards of the same rank): 2
  - Pair royal, or prial (three of the same rank): 6
  - Double pair royal (all four of a rank): 12
- Runs (sequences)
  - Run of three: 2
  - Run of four: 4
  - Run of 5 or more: 1 per card
- Flushes
  - Three or more cards of the same suit: 1 per card

== Terminology ==
In the game, certain cards have peculiar names and scores, like "flatback" (K♠) 6, "countenance" (Q♥) 4, "Roger" (J♥) 5, and "knave noddy" – name applied to the knave of the suit turned up at the start of the play – scores 2 to the dealer.

The earliest reference to the game in the Oxford English Dictionary, dates from 1589. It is now presumed extinct, although Parlett published its rules in 2008.

== See also ==
- Svoyi Koziri

== Literature ==
- Festivous notes on the History and adventures of the renowned Don Quixote by – 1768
- Parlett, David (2008). The Penguin Book of Card Games, Penguin, London. ISBN 978-0-141-03787-5
