= Kings Cribbage =

Word based board game

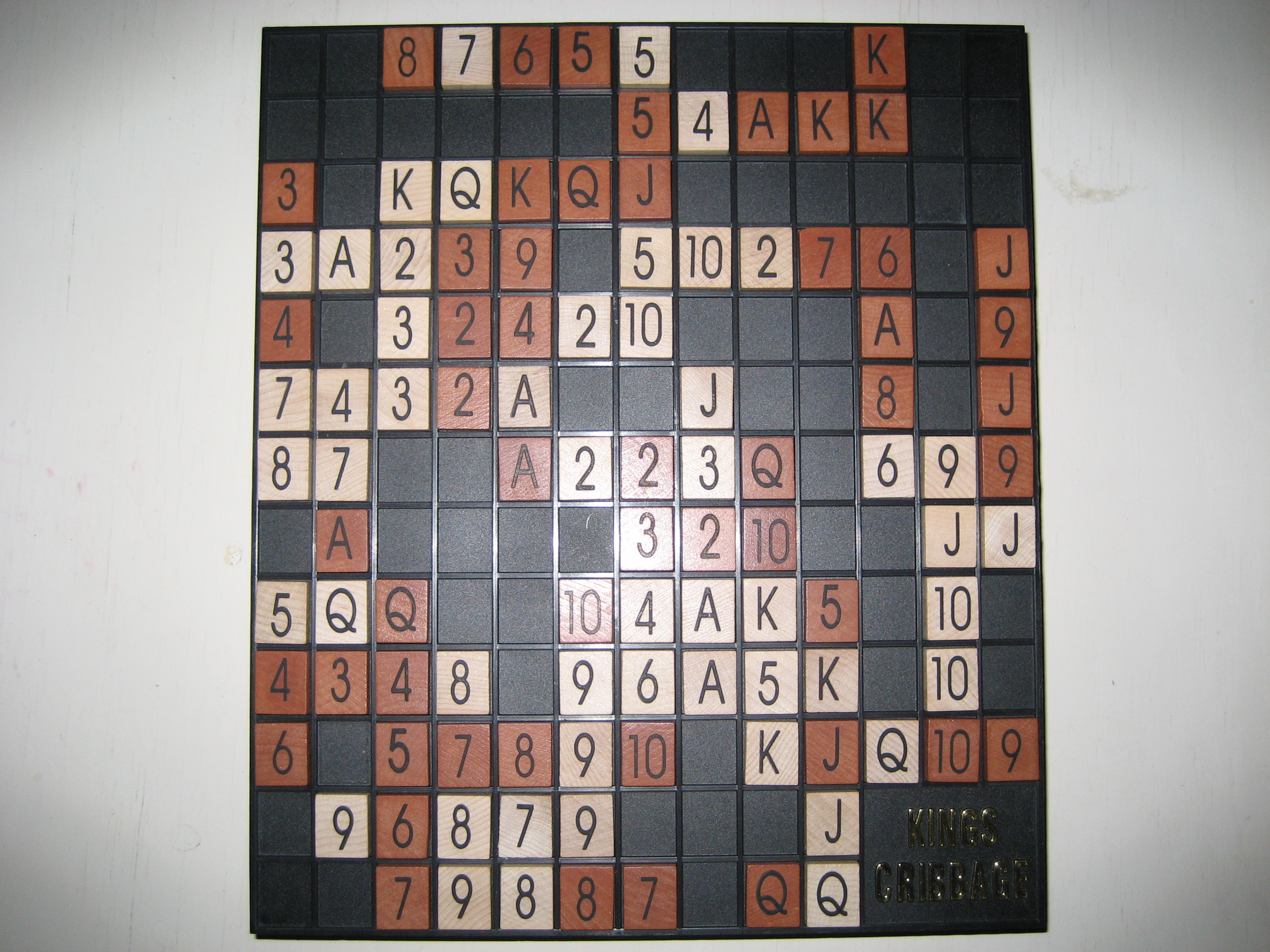
- A completed game of Kings Cribbage
- Players: 2-4
- Setup time: 2 minutes
- Playing time: 40 minutes
- Chance: Medium
- Age range: 8+
- Skills: Counting, Strategy

Kings Cribbage is a board game released by Cococo Games in 1997 that is a portmanteau-style game, scoring like cribbage but played similar to Scrabble.

== Description ==
The game, for 2–4 players, features a raised-grid gameboard and 104 tiles in two colors that are marked like a suit of cards (A-2-3-4-5-6-7-8-9-10-J-Q-K). The 6s and 9s can be used as either value by flipping them around, but once laid as either a 6 or a 9, the original value remains for the rest of the game.

For setup, each player is given a tile holder, and the tiles are placed in the drawing bag. To determine who goes first, players draw a tile — the highest tile goes first. Every player then draws five tiles as their starting "hand".

=== Scoring ===
The focus of the game is to place tiles that then score like cribbage:

- Any combination adding up to 15 = 2 pts
- Pair = 2 pts
- Three of a kind = 6 pts
- Four of a kind = 12 pts
- Five of a kind = 20 pts
- Run of 3, 4 or 5 = 3, 4 or 5 pts respectively

In addition, the first player receives a bonus of 10 points, using all 5 tiles is an extra 10 points, and creating a hand of five tiles on the board hand that are all the same color adds an extra 10 points.

=== Gameplay ===
The first player places anywhere from two to five tiles in a line anywhere on the board that would result in a cribbage score and takes the score that results. If the player does not have any scoring tiles, the player passes. If the player was able to play any tiles, they draw enough tiles to replace the ones used, and play moves to the player on the left.

From this point on, players can lay anywhere from one to five tiles, but like Scrabble, at least one of the new tiles must interact with the tiles already on the board. In addition, the subsequent combination of new and previously laid tiles must result in a valid cribbage scoring combination. For example, laying a J beside a 4 is invalid, since there is no cribbage score. Laying a J and A beside a 4 is valid, since it adds up to 15 for a score of 2.

=== Victory conditions ===
The game continues until one player has used up all their tiles. All other players must subtract from their current score the point value of the tiles they still hold. Once final scores have been determined, the player with the highest score is the winner.

== Reception ==
David Bukszpan, in his 2012 book Is that a Word?, panned the game, saying it was "not terribly easy to pick up, and seems destined to remain forever abandoned and gathering dust in the great toy attic of history."

Despite this assessment, the game did gain some measure of popularity in the UK, resulting in tournaments.

The game reviewer for SaskToday expected the game would bog down and eventually end prematurely due to non-scoring hands, but was pleasantly surprised that "Many hands later that has not been the case. I can only recall a couple of times either the better half, or myself, has even considered missing a turn laying tiles in favour of returning some to the bag to draw a different 'hand.' I also expected, again initially, that the odds of playing out so many tiles would be limited, but again tiles seem to play right to the end. We may end up with one, two, three tiles in hand when no moves are left – you peg backwards for those tiles – but expect 100 tiles to be in play most games." The review ended on a positive note, saying, "This is a game every cribbage player needs to own, and I suspect Scrabble players will appreciate it too."
