= Costly Colours =

English card game

- "Fascinating relative of Cribbage"
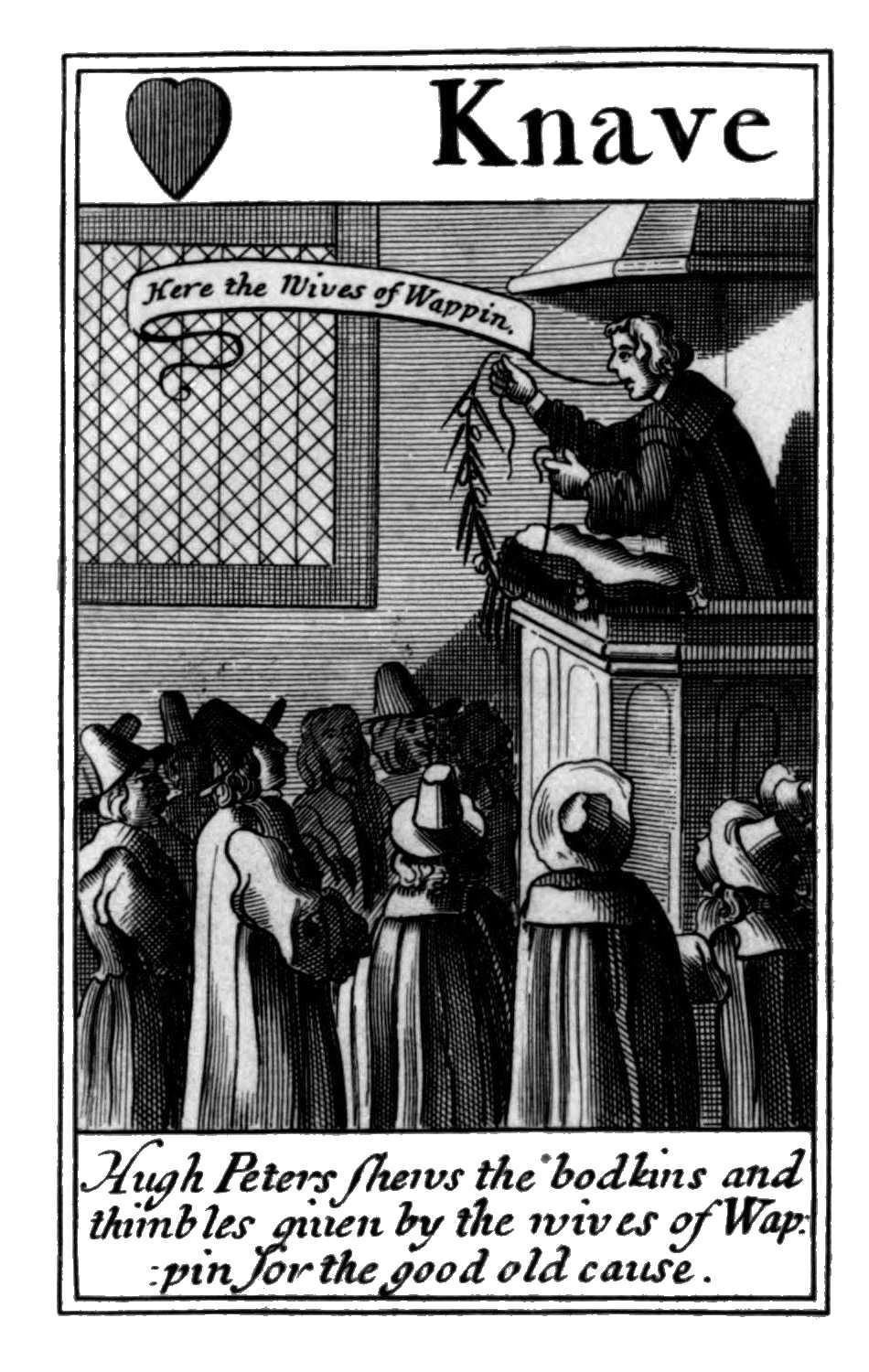
- The Knave of Hearts from a 17th century English deck of cards. Any Knave turned as trumps becomes the Right Knave and scores "four for his heels".
- Origin: England
- Alternative names: Costly
- Type: matching game
- Players: 2
- Cards: 52
- Deck: English pattern, French-suited
- Rank (high→low): A K Q J 10 – 2
- Play: Alternate
- Playing time: 15-30 min.

Related games
- Cribbage • Noddy
- includes suit and colour combinations, no crib, 3 cards dealt to each player

Costly Colours, sometimes just called Costly, is a historical English card game for two players and a "fascinating relative of cribbage". The game "requires a moderate amount of skill in playing, and is well adapted to teach quickness in counting". It has more combinations than cribbage and retains the original scoring system for points, but does not use a 'crib'. In the 19th century it was described as "peculiar to Shropshire."

== History ==
Like its close relative cribbage, Costly Colours is probably a descendant of Noddy, an English game that dates to at least 1589. The rules of Costly Colours are first described by Charles Cotton in the first edition of his compendium, The Compleat Gamester, in 1674; and reprinted in subsequent editions up to 1754. In 1816, Singer reprints the rules in his Researches, but by 1850 the game is being described as obsolete.

The game has been described as being the "speciality of Shropshire" and there is evidence that it was popular there in the early 19th-century, not least from a booklet published in Shrewsbury in 1805 entitled The Royal Game of Costly Colours which claimed that it was "an improvement on the game of Cribbage". About this time there was a "Costly Club" in Whitchurch that met in the evenings and, in the 1830s, elderly people still met to play the game in fours, but more often in twos, "with zest". Although they taught it to younger folk, the latter gave it up in favour of cribbage, "though it may be doubted whether costly was not the simpler and livelier game."

In 1883, a detailed description of the rules, based on the Shrewsbury booklet and on accounts by veteran players, is recorded by Georgina Jackson in Shropshire Folk-Lore, the information having been compiled in 1874. In 1894 the game is recorded as having been "in use at Shrewsbury and Ellesmere" but that "few now play or understand this old-fashioned game." In 1924, the game is briefly described in Mary Webb's Shropshire novel, Precious Bane, which was set in the time of the Napoleonic Wars.

Despite fading into obscurity, the game was discovered still being played in a Lancashire pub as recently as the early 1980s. In 2008, Parlett published the rules of "this fascinating relative of Cribbage and probably co-descendant of Noddy...".

== Cards ==
A standard 52-card pack of English pattern, French-suited cards is used with Aces ranking high.

== Rules ==
Although Cotton's rules are for two players, Jackson's 1874 rules state that it is played by two or four players. The following is based on Jackson except where stated, and assumes two players.

=== Aim ===
The aim is to be first to score 61 points (Cotton) or 121 points (Parlett), recorded as chalks on a slate or pegged as holes on a board. (Note: Jackson says that a cribbage board is used to score; Cotton implies that either a slate and chalk or a peg board of some description is used.)

=== Preliminaries ===
Players cut for the first deal and the lowest takes it. Dealer deals 3 cards, individually, to each player and turns the next for trump. If a Knave (i.e. Jack) (Note: Cotton uses 'Knave'; Jackson refers to both, but uses 'Jack' more frequently.) is turned, dealer scores 4 points, announcing "four for his heels." It must be scored before a card is played or it is forfeited. Elder (Note: Cotton: 'Eldest'.) then asks if the dealer wishes to mog, (Note: Cotton: Mogg.) i.e. exchange a card with the adversary. Should the dealer refuse, elder scores 1. If the dealer consents and the challenger refuses, the dealer scores 1.

=== Play ===
Elder leads the first card and the two players alternately play one card to the table, as they do so stating the cumulative total of the card values thus far played, as in cribbage. If a player cannot play a card without exceeding the Hitter (e.g. if the cards played add up to 23 and a Nine is held in the hand), the player says "Go", whereupon the adversary scores 1 and plays their cards out as far as possible without exceeding the Hitter.

=== Scoring ===
Players score points as they go, as well as points in their hand cards at the end of the deal.

There are three Points: 15, 25 and 31, the last being called Hitter or Grand Point. If a player, in playing their card, reaches one of these Points exactly, as many points are scored as the number of cards played so far in the current deal. For example, if a Seven and Five have been played and the player adds a Three, announcing "fifteen", 3 points are scored for the three cards played.

Scoring combinations are as follows. Cards 'held in the hand' are counted at the end, the players keeping their cards separate as they play:

- Points (in play or hand)
  - 15 – each card played counts 1.
  - 25 – each card played counts 1.
  - 31 (Hitter or Grand Point) – each card played counts 1.
- Knaves and Deuces (in play or hand)
  - A Knave or Deuce turned up as trump counts "4 for his heels," which must be scored by the dealer before a card is played.
  - A Knave or Deuce of the trump suit, held in the hand, counts 4.
  - A Knave or Deuce of any other suit than trump, held in the hand counts "2 for his nob."
  - Examples:
    - Two Knaves or Deuces count 6, i.e. 2 for each and 2 for the pair; but if one of them suit with the trump card they score 8.
    - Three Knaves (not Deuces) and a Five turned up being Colours with the prial (Note: Cotton calls this by its original name of Pair-Royal.) and the Right Knave, i.e. the Knave of the same suit as the trump card, count 34. (Note: Jackson says "31", but Parlett confirms this is an error and should be 34.)
- Pairs and Prials (in play or hand)
  - A pair, or two similar cards not being Knaves or Deuces, counts 2.
  - A prial, or three similar cards, counts 9.
  - A double prial, or four similar cards counts 18.
  - It is not allowed to pair with prials, but each scores separately whether in hand or playing.
- Colours (in hand only)
  - Three cards of the same colour, one being of a different suit, count 2.
  - Three cards of the same suit, count 3.
  - Four cards of the same colour, two being of a different suit, count 4.
  - Four of the same colour, three being of the same suit, count 5.
  - Four of the same suit, called Costly or Costly Colours, count 6.
- Sequences (in play only)
  - These score according to the number in the sequence when playing, but not in hand, and it is of no consequence which card is thrown down first. For example if an Ace is played first, then a Three, next a Five, then a Two, and lastly a Four, this will count 5 for the sequence.

According to "W.H.", a Five and two Tens are called a Jenkin; and a Five and three Tens or two Fives and two Tens are called a Double Jenkin.

Beginning with eldest, each player now reckons up the points in his or her hand and played cards, scoring for all combinations that make up exactly 15 or 25 plus 4 points if a combination adds up to exactly 31. Players also score combinations in their hand as per the list in the order: points, Knaves and Deuces, pairs and prials, colours and sequences. A hand that scores nothing is called a cock's next. Game is 61 or 121.

== Four-hand variant ==
According to Jackson, "opposite partners mog with each other, the elder hand challenging. If the opposite partners do not mog, the dealer has the privilege of mogging with the 'deck,' which he does by taking the card next under the trump and substituting in its place one out of his own hand."

== Bibliography ==
- _ (1805). The Royal Game of Costly Colours. Shrewsbury: J. and W. Eddowes.
- Bohn, Henry G. (1850). The Hand-Book of Games. London: Bohn.
- Cotton, Charles (1674) The Compleat Gamester. London: A.M.
- G.S.C. (1894). "Costly" in Bye-Gones Relating to Wales and the Border Counties (1893-4). London: Elliot Stock, Oswestry and Wrexham: Minshall. pp. 294/295.
- Halliwell-Phillipps, James Orchard (1850). A Dictionary of Archaic and Provincial Words, Obsolete Phrases, Proverbs and Ancient Customs from the Fourteenth Century., 2nd edn. Volume 1. London: John Russell Smith.
- Jackson, Georgina Frederica (1879). Shropshire Word-Book: A Glossary of Archaic and Provincial Words, Etc., Used in the County. London:Trübner. p. 99.
- Jackson, Georgina Frederica (1883). Shropshire Folk-Lore: A Sheaf of Gleanings, Vol. 1. ed. by Charlotte Sophia Burne. London: Trübner.
- Johnson, Charles (1754). The Compleat Gamester. 8th edn. London: J. Hodges.
- Parlett, David (2008). The Penguin Book of Card Games, Penguin, London. ISBN 978-0-141-03787-5
- Singer, Samuel Weller (1816). Researches Into the History of Playing Cards and Printing. London: Bensley.
- Webb, Mary [1924] (1978), Precious Bane, London: Virago.
- W.H. (1877). "Game of Costly" and "The Game of Costly" in Salopian Shreds and Patches. Vol. 2 (1876–77), reprinted from Eddowes's Shropshire Journal. Shrewsbury: Eddowes's Journal. pp. 133 & 155.
