= Cribbage solitaire =

Card game

Cribbage solitaire (also known as cribbage patience) is a solitaire card game using a deck of 52 playing cards. It is based on the game of five-card cribbage, also known as the "old game", and is one of many solitaire card games based on those played by at least two players, best known of which is poker solitaire.

== Rules ==
First, twelve cards are dealt into two hands as if there are two players. The player looks at the first hand and discards two cards to contribute to an area known as the "crib". The player then looks at the second hand and contributes two more cards from that hand to the crib. A thirteenth card, the "starter", is then dealt. The starter combines with the crib and the two hands to each form a five-card cribbage hand, much the same way as the community cards in Texas hold 'em poker.

Points are scored according to how the hand/crib is combined with the starter. Hands are scored like in actual cribbage and the combinations below may occur more than once in just one hand:

- Fifteens - Given that face cards are valued at ten and aces at one, a combination of two or more cards that add up to fifteen are scored two points each "fifteen".
- Pairs - Each pair in a hand is scored two points each pair. A "pair royal", or three of a kind, scores six points since three cards of the same rank can form three pairs, while a "double pair royal", or four of a kind, scores twelve points since four cards of the same rank can form six pairs.
- Runs - Three or more consecutive cards (regardless of suit) is scored three to five points depending on the number of cards on that run.
- Flush - If the four cards on the hand is of the same suit, it is scored four points, plus an additional point if the starter is of the very same suit as those in the hand. A flush on the crib (four cards of the same suit) only scores however if the starter is of the same suit as the four cards in the crib. If so, it is scored five points; otherwise, only the other combinations formed in the crib are tallied.
- His nobs - A jack in "his nobs", i.e. one that has the same suit as the starter, scores a point.
- His heels - A jack in "his heels", i.e. one that is the starter gives two points to the entire tally for the deal.

Points are added from the two hands and from the crib and given a running total. This makes a set or deal. The cards used are then discarded and a new set of 13 cards are dealt. Since each deal uses a fourth of the entire deck, a game of cribbage solitaire is composed of four such deals. The points from the four deals are added up into a final total for the entire game. The winning final score can range from 101 to 121 (the points needed to win a game of regular cribbage) according to the player's preference.

== Variants ==
The rules stated above are those written by Peter Arnold in his book Card Games for One. The version of Cribbage Solitaire described in Hoyle's Rules of Games is played differently. In this version, instead of 13 cards only nine cards are dealt: the six cards in the hand, the first two cards of the crib, and the starter. The player contributes to the crib another two cards from his hand. Points are then scored similar to what is described above. The starter is then placed at the bottom of the deck, so that a total of six hands with cribs and starters are played, followed by one hand without a crib or a starter. An average expected score is about 85, and some sources consider anything above 80 to be a win, while others suggest a score of at least 120 is a win. Cards are dealt 3-2-3 between Hand and Crib. Crib selection is made before flipping starter. The last four cards of the deck are counted as a Crib.

== See also ==
- Cribbage Squares
- List of solitaires
- Glossary of solitaire
