= John Cotgrave =

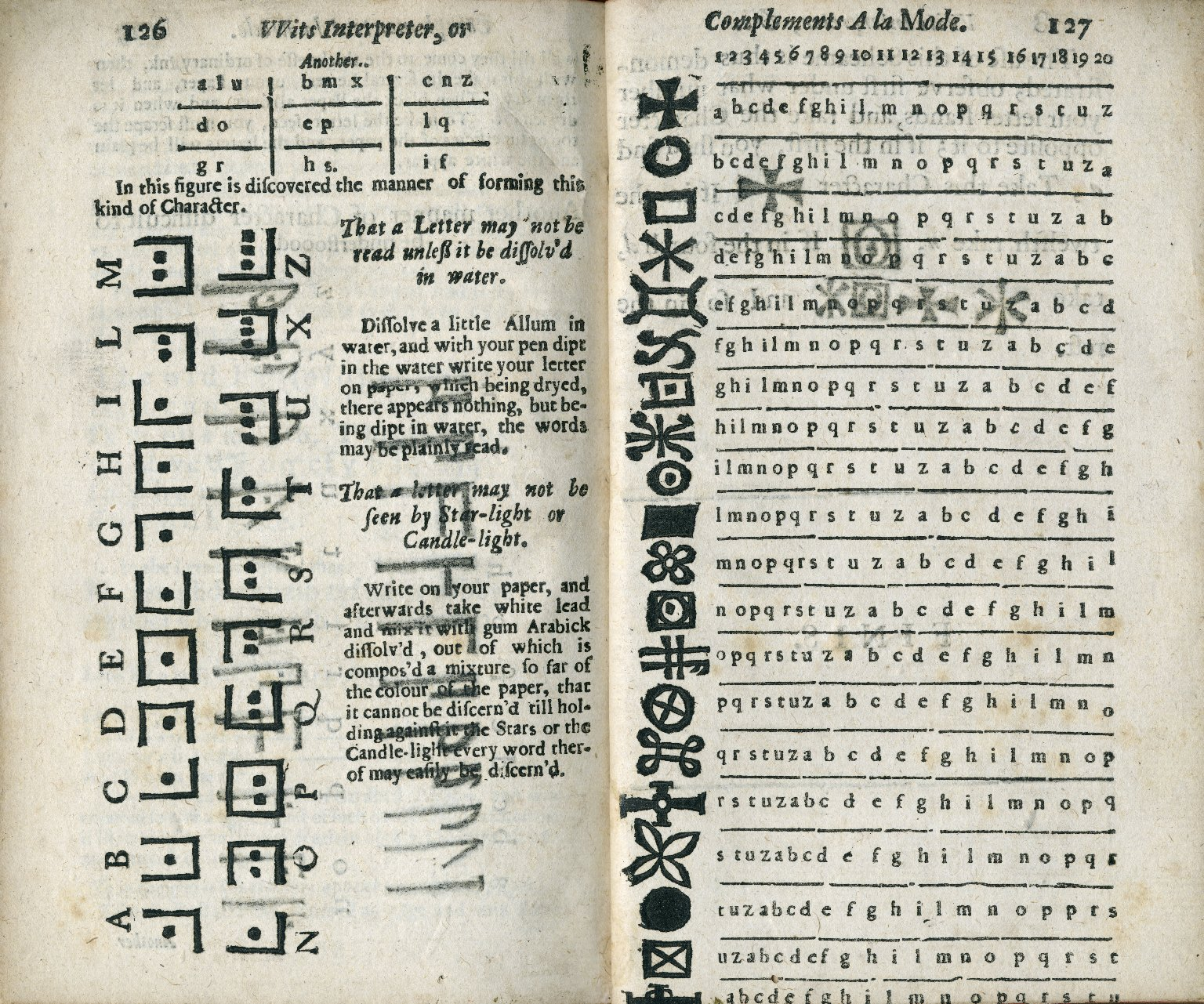
Ciphers and secret ink recipes in Wits Interpreter

John Cotgrave (1611 - ?) was an English anthologist whose works included Wit's Interpreter, notable for containing the earliest detailed descriptions of card games in English.

== Works ==
The following works by John Cotgrave are recorded:

- The Covrt Mercurie (1644). Journal. London: Tho. Forrest.
- Le Mercure Anglois (1644–1648). Journal. London: Robert White (in French).
- The English treasury of wit and language (1655) London: Humphrey Moseley.
- Wits interpreter, the English Parnassvs, 1st edn. (1655) London: N. Brooke.
- The Muses Mistresse, or A Store-House of Rich Fancies (1660), London.
- Wits interpreter, the English Parnassvs, 2nd edn. (1662) London: N. Brook.
- Wits interpreter, the English Parnassvs, 3rd edn. (1671) London: N. Brook.

== Wit's Interpreter ==
Wit's Interpreter has been described as a "sort of Idler's Vademecum". The section on "games and sports" described in detail for the first time in English "the Noble Spanish Game of Ombre", "the Ingenious Game of Piquet", "the Gentile Game of Cribbidge" and "the Princely Game of Chesse".

Its format is as a book of quotations not unlike earlier well known books such as Politeuphuia (1597), Palladis Tamia (1598) Wit's Treasury (1598), Belvedere (1600) and Wits Labyrinth (1648). As a genre, these works comprise a mass of quotations grouped by subjects such as beauty or sin. Cotgrave is unusual, however, in that it is written almost entirely in poetic form.

Cotgrave's work contains "memorable extracts from about 250 plays" quoting frequently from John Webster's The Duchess of Malfi and The White Devil, but the most cited were Sir Fulke Greville's Alaham and Mustapha.

In the same work, Cotgrave published a cipher key by Cardinal Richelieu. In successive editions, more information on the manufacture of secret inks was described.

== Sources ==
- Bentley, Gerald Eades (1943). John Cotgrave's "English Treasury of Wit and Language" and the Elizabethan Drama. University of N. Carolina.
- Daybell, James and Andrew Gordon (2016). Cultures of Correspondence in Early Modern Britain. Philadelphia: University of Pennsylvania.
- Wymer, Rowland (1995). Webster and Ford. Basingstoke: Macmillan.
