= Palladis Tamia =

1598 book by Frances Meres

Palladis Tamia: Wits Treasury; Being the Second Part of Wits Commonwealth
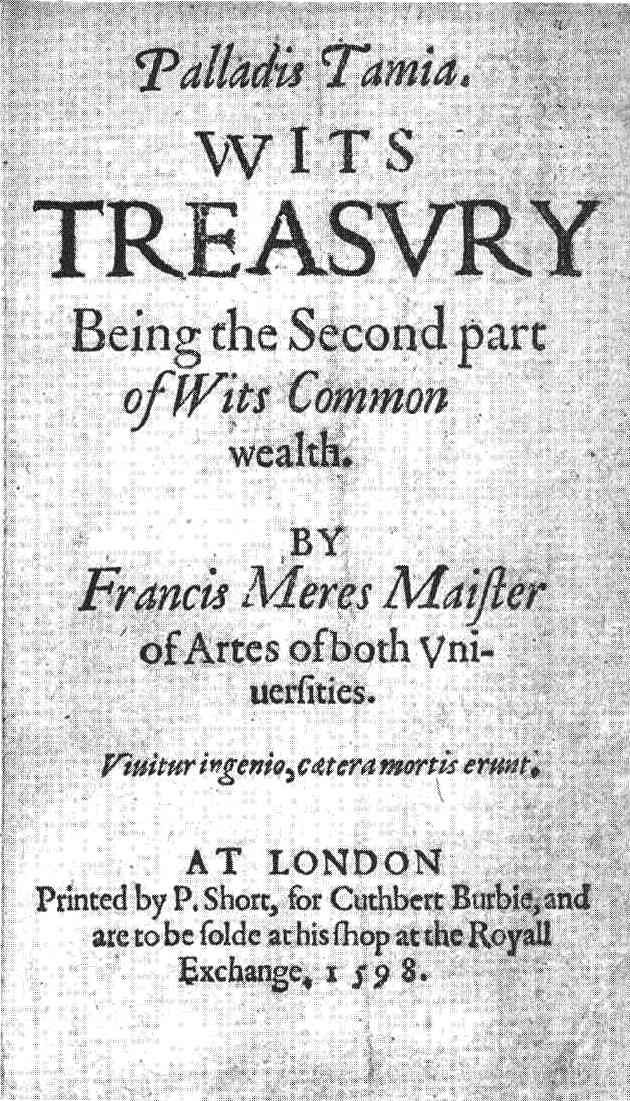
- Palladis Tamia (1598) title page
- Author: Francis Meres
- Language: English
- Publication date: 1598

Palladis Tamia: Wits Treasury; Being the Second Part of Wits Commonwealth is a 1598 commonplace book written by the minister Francis Meres. It is important in English literary history as the first critical account of the poems and early plays of William Shakespeare. It was listed in the Stationers Register 7 September 1598.

Palladis Tamia contains moral and critical reflections borrowed from various sources, and included sections on books, on philosophy, on music and painting, as well as the famous "Comparative Discourse of our English poets with the Greeke, Latin, and Italian poets" that enumerates the English poets from Geoffrey Chaucer to Meres' own day, and compares each with a classical author. While Meres is considerably indebted to George Puttenham's earlier The Arte of English Poesie (1589), the section extends the catalogue of poets and contains many first notices of Meres's contemporaries.

The title refers to Greek Πᾰλλᾰ́δος (Pallados, "of Pallas," a name of Athena), and ταμεία (tameia, "treasury"). There is also probably a pun on Tamia, a Latin name for the River Thames.

The book was reissued in 1634 as a school book, and was partially reprinted in the Ancient Critical Essays (1811-1811) of Joseph Haslewood, Edward Arber's English Garner, and George Gregory Smith's Elizabethan Critical Essays (1904).

== Shakespeare references ==
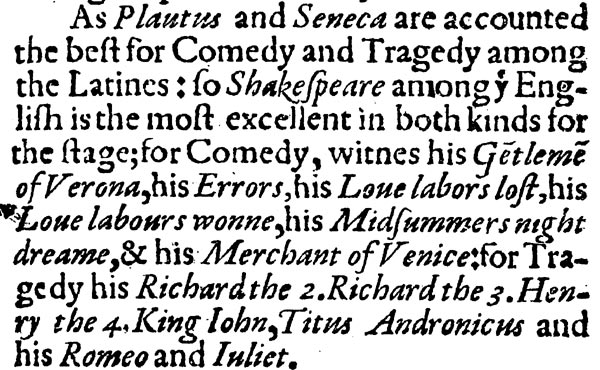
Excerpt from Palladis Tamia (1598), f. 282r, listing 12 of Shakespeare's plays

In the "Comparative Discourse" section Meres lists a dozen Shakespearean plays, identified by him as six comedies and six tragedies (Comedies: Two Gentlemen of Verona, Comedy of Errors, Love's Labours Lost, Love Labours Won, Midsummer Night's Dream, and Merchant of Venice; Tragedies: Richard II, Richard III, Henry the IV, King John, Titus Andronicus, and Romeo and Juliet), establishing their composition before 1598.

This passage has sometimes been taken to indicate that only those Shakespeare plays had been written by 1598. However, there is no way of knowing how complete Meres' knowledge of the published plays actually was or whether he even intended to produce a comprehensive list of all the plays; at the very least, it is generally agreed that Meres neglected The Taming of the Shrew (1590–91), and all three parts of the Henry VI trilogy, which most scholars believe were written by 1591, seven years before Palladis Tamia.

== Marlowe references ==
In the "Comparative Discourse" section Meres describes the "tragicall death" of "our tragicall poet" Christopher Marlowe who "was stabd to death by a bawdy seruing man, a riuall of his in his lewde loue." This passage implied that Marlowe had been killed in a fight over a lover, though the word "rival" can also mean "companion", perhaps implying that the serving man himself was the lover. It was the second published reference to Marlowe's death, following Thomas Beard's Theatre of God's Judgements (1597), which states that Marlowe was stabbed in self-defence by a man he attacked in the street. The full details of Marlowe's death in 1593 were only finally uncovered by Leslie Hotson in 1925.

== Context ==
Palladis Tamia translates from the Greek literally as "Pallas' Housewife". "Tamia" is the Greek word for a female slave in charge of a household, but it is more likely that "tamia" as used by Meres in this case is a form of "tamias", a dispenser, steward or treasurer, and here used to suggest, by metonymy, the "Treasury" of Meres's subtitle. "Palladis" is the Latin genitive of "Pallas," another name for the goddess Athena, who in Greek mythology was the goddess of wisdom and statecraft. Thus, Palladis Tamia becomes the "dispenser" or "treasurer" of Pallas Athena, or "wisdom".

Palladis Tamia was the second in a series of four volumes of short pithy sayings with the generic title of Wits Commonwealth, the first of which was Politeuphuia: Wits Commonwealth (1597), compiled by John Bodenham or by Nicholas Ling, the publisher. The third volume was Wits Theater of the Little World (1599), dedicated to Bodenham and variously credited to him, Robert Allott, or Ling, and the fourth and last was, Palladis Palatium: wisedoms pallace. Or The fourth part of Wits commonwealth (1604), with no author named but attributed to William Wrednott in the Stationer’s Register.

== See also ==
- 1598 in poetry

== Bibliography ==
- Allen, Don C. “The Classical Scholarship of Francis Meres” PMLA, XLVIII: 1 (March 1933), 418-425.
- Bentley, Gerald Eades. “John Cotgrave’s English Treasury of Wit and Language and the Elizabethan Drama” Studies in Philology, Vol. XL, 1943.
- Meres, Francis. Palladis Tamia. Wits Treasury. Printed by P. Short for Cuthbert Burbie. 1598. Facsimile Reprint of the Church copy in the Henry E. Huntington Library. Introduction by Don C. Allen.
