= Cribbage Squares =

Card game

- A patience game
- Origin: US
- Alternative names: Cribbage Square
- Type: Planner
- Deck: 52-card English pattern pack

Cribbage Squares, occasionally Cribbage Square, is a patience or card solitaire based on Cribbage which can be played using a deck of playing cards. This game works the same way as Poker Squares, but with cribbage scoring.

Seventeen cards are used, although there are variants that increase the level of strategy by dealing extra cards so that players have more choice of what to use.

== History ==
The first rules for Cribbage Squares appear around 1950 in America as one of three Cribbage solitaire variants. The game has been implemented in several software collections of solitaire games.

== Rules ==
First, sixteen cards are dealt one at a time in a 4x4 grid, provided that card must touch horizontally, vertically, or diagonally to any of those already in the grid. However, once a card is placed on the grid, it cannot be moved. After these sixteen cards are put into place, a seventeenth card, the starter, is turned face-up.

Points are scored according to how the hands formed horizontally or vertically are combined with the starter. Horizontally and vertically in this case means that each row and column in the grid is scored as a cribbage hand.

Hands are scored as in normal cribbage and the combinations below may occur more than once in just one hand:

- Fifteens - Given that face cards are valued at ten and aces at one, a combination of two or more cards that add up to fifteen are scored two points each "fifteen."
- Pairs - each pair in a hand is scored two points each pair. A pair royal, or three of a kind, scores six points since three cards of the same rank can form three pairs, while a double pair royal, or four of a kind, scores twelve points since four cards of the same rank can form six pairs.
- Runs - Three or more consecutive cards (regardless of suit) is scored three to five points depending on the number of cards on that run.
- Flush - If the four cards on the hand is of the same suit, it is scored four points, plus an additional point if the starter is of the very same suit as those in the hand.
- His Nobs - A jack in "his nobs," i.e. one that has the same suit as the starter, scores a point.
- His Heels - A jack in "his heels," i.e. one that is the starter gives two points to the entire tally for the deal.

The object of this game is to reach the highest score possible using the sixteen cards. According to The Complete Book of Solitaire and Patience Games, the player is considered to "win" if the total score is at least 61.

== Solutions ==
Two candidate solutions for maximum possible scores are as below for 170 and 165 points respectively.

King of hearts	King of clubs	King of diamonds	King of spades	20
Queen of hearts	Queen of clubs	Queen of diamonds	Queen of spades	20
Jack of hearts	Jack of clubs	Jack of diamonds	Jack of spades	21
10 of hearts	5 of clubs	5 of diamonds	5 of spades	28
18	21	21	21	5 of hearts

Score: 170

7 of hearts	7 of diamonds	8 of clubs	8 of spades	24
8 of hearts	8 of diamonds	7 of clubs	7 of spades	24
3 of hearts	6 of diamonds	6 of clubs	6 of spades	24
9 of hearts	9 of diamonds	9 of clubs	9 of spades	20
13	20	20	20	6 of hearts

Score: 165

== Variations ==
To increase the skill element of the game, one variation involves using one or two 'reserve' piles, each of which can hold up to 5 cards that can later be played on to the grid.

An "open" version of the game increases the amount of strategy by dealing all 17 cards face-up before placing them in the grid.

== Bibliography ==
- Moyse, Alphonse Jr. (1950). 150 Ways to Play Solitaire. Cincinnati: USPCC. 128 pp.

== See also ==
- Cribbage Solitaire
- List of patiences and solitaires
- Glossary of patience and solitaire terms
