= Hounds and jackals =

Ancient Egyptian board game

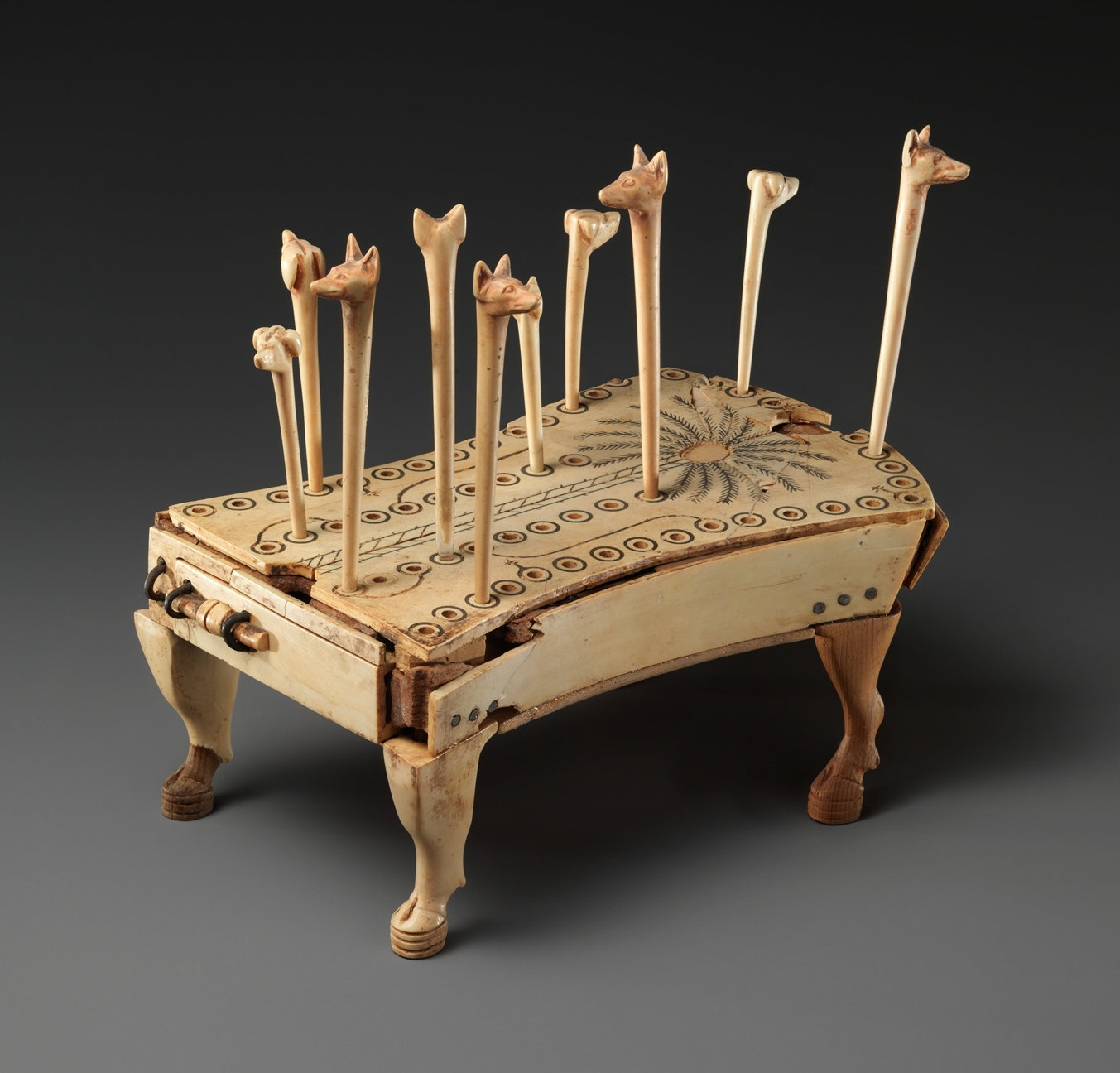
Hounds and jackals board, ivory, found at Thebes, 12th Dynasty

Hounds and jackals or dogs and jackals is the modern name given to an ancient Egyptian tables game that is known from several examples of gaming boards and gaming pieces found in excavations. The modern name was invented by Howard Carter, who found one complete gaming set in a Theban tomb from the reign of ancient Egyptian pharaoh Amenemhat IV that dates to the 12th Dynasty. The latter game set is one of the best preserved examples and is today in the Metropolitan Museum of Art in New York. He called it "Hounds contra Jackals". Game historians prefer to call it "fifty-eight holes".

The gaming board has two sets of 29 holes. Gaming pieces are ten small sticks with either jackal or dog heads. The game appeared in Egypt, around 2000 BC and was mainly popular in the Middle Kingdom. In the 1956 movie The Ten Commandments, Pharaoh Seti (Cedric Hardwicke) and Nefretiri (Anne Baxter) are shown playing the game.

== History ==
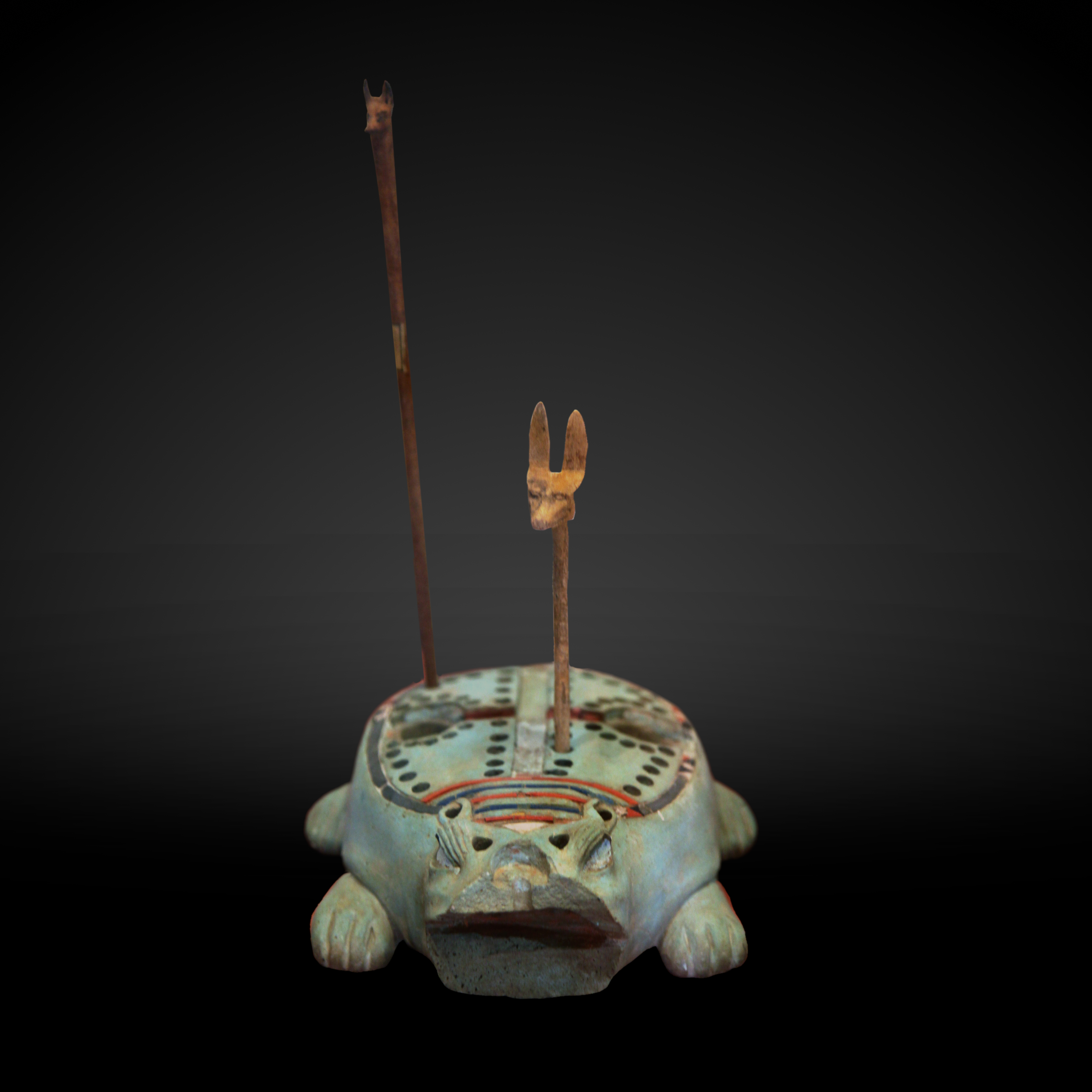
Hounds and jackals game set.

Hounds and jackals, also known as 58 holes, is a well-known Bronze Age board game which was invented in Ancient Egypt 4,000 years ago. It is possible, given the present evidence from Anatolia and the Caucasus, that this game may not have originated in Egypt after all. This has been suggested in the past, but now there is more evidence for the early popularity of this game far from Egypt.

William Mathew Flinders Petrie initially discovered the game and published about it in 1890. More than 60 examples of the game have been revealed in Egypt, Mesopotamia, Israel, Syria, Iran, Azerbaijan, around the Levant and Mediterranean since that time.

A 2013 study of 68 boards from across the Near East suggests that the game was transmitted via trade relations from Egypt to Central Anatolia around 1950 BC, and was later transmitted via trade from there to Mesopotamia. By contrast, the game was transmitted via conquest to Nubia around 1980 BC, and by trade and/or conquest to the Levant at an as-yet-unknown date.

Sticks were made of expensive materials such as ivory, silver and gold based on the findings at some of the archaeological sites. Wood was also used in the preparation of ordinary pegs, but such examples would not have survived.

The complete set of this Egyptian game discovered in 1910 by the British archaeologist Howard Carter is now displayed in the Metropolitan Museum of Art in New York.

== Name ==
The original name of this game is unknown. Different archaeologists use different names.

The game was named "Hounds and jackals" by Carter because of the decorative shapes of the pegs – one player's pins were carved in the form of hounds, while the opposite player's pins were carved as jackals.

The game was called 58 Holes by William Mathew Flinders Petrie because the game board features 58 holes (29 for each side).

"Shen" is the less common name for this game; it was inscribed in Egyptian hieroglyphs around the big hole on some of the boards found.

The game is also called the "Palm tree game" as some of the holes were replaced by tree figures.

== Rules ==
The game is played with two players. The gaming board has two sets of 29 holes. Gaming pieces are ten small sticks with either jackal or dog heads. One player takes five jackal heads, and the other player takes five dog heads. The aim of the game was perhaps to start at one point on the board and to reach with all figures another point on the board. The hole on the top of the board is slightly bigger than others and accepted as the endpoint for the players.

== Diffusion ==
This game is also known from Mesopotamia and the Caucasus.

The game was spread to Mesopotamia in the late 3rd millennium BC and was popular until the 1st millennium BC. The game spread into Assyria, Israel, Anatolia, Babylon and Persia.

During the archaeological excavations, boards were found from remains of Assyrian merchant colonies in Central Anatolia dated 19th–18th centuries B.C. There are options that these boards were brought to Anatolia from Mesopotamia by Assyrian traders, or through the connection between Cappadocia and Egypt.

However, the game was popular in the Mediterranean and surrounding areas, where it preserved its general shape and rules wherever it was played.

More than 68 gameboards of hounds and jackals have been discovered in the archaeological excavations in various territories, including Syria (Tell Ajlun, Ras el-Ain, Khafaje), Israel (Tel Beth Shean, Gezer), Iraq (Uruk, Nippur, Ur, Nineveh, Ashur, Babylon), Iran (Tappeh Sialk, Susa, Luristan), Turkey (Karalhuyuk, Kultepe, Acemhuyuk), Azerbaijan (Gobustan) and Egypt (Buhen, El-Lahun, Sedment).

Other animals (horses, cats, or sparrowhawks) have been found on the top of the pegs, in addition to dogs and jackals, but no such pieces have been found in the Near East where this game was played from the beginning of the second millennium till the middle of the first millennium. Tokens made of ivory with a notch at the top found at Megiddo have been linked to board games. In this site, pins made of ivory with a top as a dog or jackal head were also revealed. Undecorated sticks were found at Ur.

One of the examples of hounds and jackals was discovered in Necropolis B at Tepe Sialk in Iran.

In April 2018, archaeologist Walter Crist from the American Museum of Natural History discovered the examples of 58 holes in Gobustan, Azerbaijan. After examining the rock shelters having complicated dot patterns carved on them, he includes this one of the samples of Hounds and Jackals. In his speech at the annual meeting of American Schools of Oriental Research in November, Crist linked this close relation as: "Bronze Age herders in that region must have had contacts with the Near Eastern world. Ancient games often passed across cultures and acted as a social lubricant."

== Similarity with other board games ==
Hounds and jackals has similar characteristics with other ancient two player race games such as Twenty Squares, Royal Game of Ur or Senet. Like Senet, both have been found in Egyptian tombs and dated to the third millennium BC, also sticks were used in them.

Twenty squares was widely spread to other territories such as Palestine, Iraq, Iran, Turkey, Syria and Cyprus as hounds and jackals games. As well as gaming rules are alike: the one who reaches the endpoint wins the game as it is in Hounds and Jackals. Dice, stones or other pieces are also used in this game to determine who should start first.

== See also ==
- Cribbage which uses a similar board.
