= Poker squares =

Patience game

- A patience game
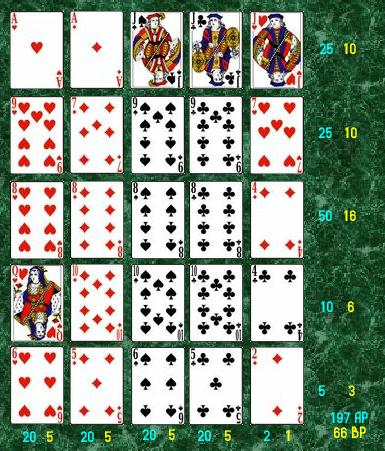
- The end of a game of poker solitaire, scoring 197 (US, scores shown in blue) or 66 (English, yellow). Horizontally, the five hands formed were two full houses (jacks full of aces and nines full of sevens), a four-of-a-kind (four eights), Three tens, and a two-pair (sixes and fives). Vertically, four flushes (one for each suit) and a pair of fours are scored.
- Named variants: Poker shuffle, serpent poker solitaire
- Family: Non-builder
- Deck: Single 52-card

Poker Squares (also known as Poker Solitaire or Poker Patience) is a patience game with the objective of building the best poker hands using just 25 cards from the deck. It rewards both lucky guessing and accurate calculation of odds.

== Rules ==
The game starts with placing a card onto a space in a 5x5 grid. Cards are placed one at a time and once a card is placed on the grid, it can no longer be moved.

Once all 25 cards are dealt, points are scored on hands of 5 cards formed horizontally in rows or vertically in columns. The number of points depend on the hierarchy of poker hands.

There are two systems of scoring: The English and the American point systems. The English system reflects the difficulty of getting the hands in the game; the American system reflects the difficulty of getting the hands in actual poker. The two systems rate the hands' scores as follows:

Poker hand	American point system	English point system
Royal flush	100	30
Straight flush	75	30
Four of a kind	50	16
Full house	25	10
Flush	20	5
Straight	15	12
Three of a kind	10	6
Two pairs	5	3
One pair	2	1

The points scored from each hand are added to the total score. Albert H. Morehead and Geoffrey Mott-Smith suggest that to win one must score at least 200 points in the American system or 70 in the English system. Because of the application of the point system, this solitaire is more prevalent as a computer game.

== Variants ==
In the variation Poker Shuffle (also called Switch-a-roo Poker Solitaire or Open Poker Squares), cards played onto the grid can be moved until all 25 cards are set. Players can even choose to deal all 25 cards face-up before beginning placement. This gives more flexibility, and gives players the opportunity to produce higher scoring hands on the grid. Scoring is the same as Poker Squares, but under these rules a winning score is 120 points in the English system and 310 points in the American system.

A two player variant can implemented by taking turns to play and comparing scores.

== See also ==
- List of solitaire games
- Glossary of solitaire terms
