= Cribbage =

Card game

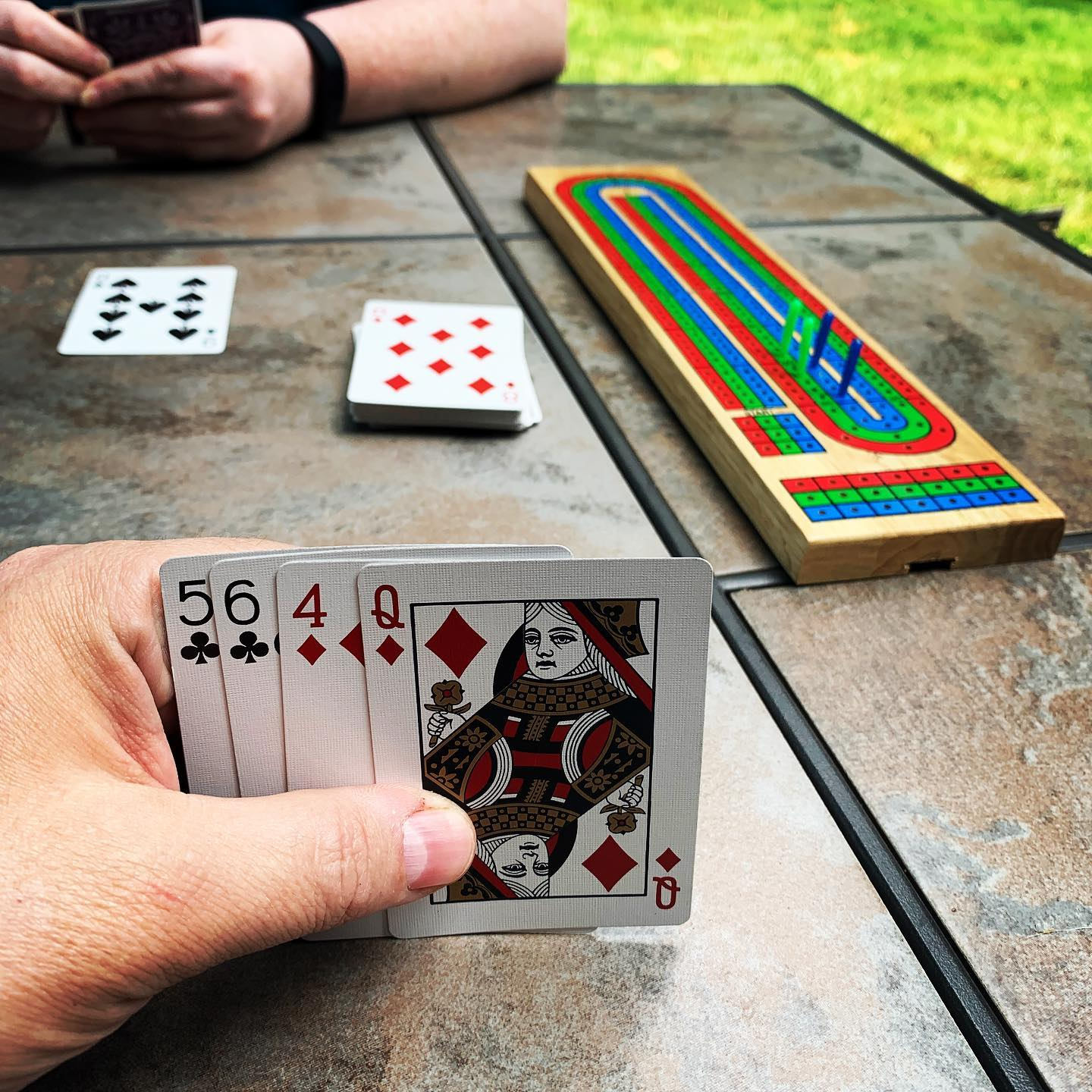
- Origin: England
- Alternative names: Crib
- Family: Matching
- Players: 2 (variations for 3–6)
- Skills: Strategy, tactics, counting
- Cards: 52
- Deck: Standard 52-card pack
- Rank (high→low): K Q J 10 9 8 7 6 5 4 3 2 A
- Play: Clockwise
- Playing time: 15–30 min.

Related games
- Noddy • Costly Colours

Cribbage, or crib, is a card game, traditionally for two players, that involves playing and grouping cards in combinations which gain points. It can be adapted for three or four players.

Cribbage has several distinctive features, including the cribbage board used for score-keeping; the crib, box, or kitty; two distinct scoring stages; and a unique scoring system, including points for groups of cards that total 15. The game has relatively few rules yet many subtleties, which accounts for its ongoing appeal and popularity. Tactical play varies, depending on which cards one's opponent has played, how many cards in the remaining pack will help the hand one holds, and what one's position on the board is. A game may be decided by a single point, and the edge often goes to an experienced player who utilizes strategy, including calculating odds and making decisions based on the relative positions of players on the board.

Both cribbage and its close relative costly colours are descended from the old English card game of noddy. Cribbage added the distinctive feature of a crib and changed the scoring system for points, whereas costly colours added more combinations but retained the original noddy scoring scheme.

== History ==
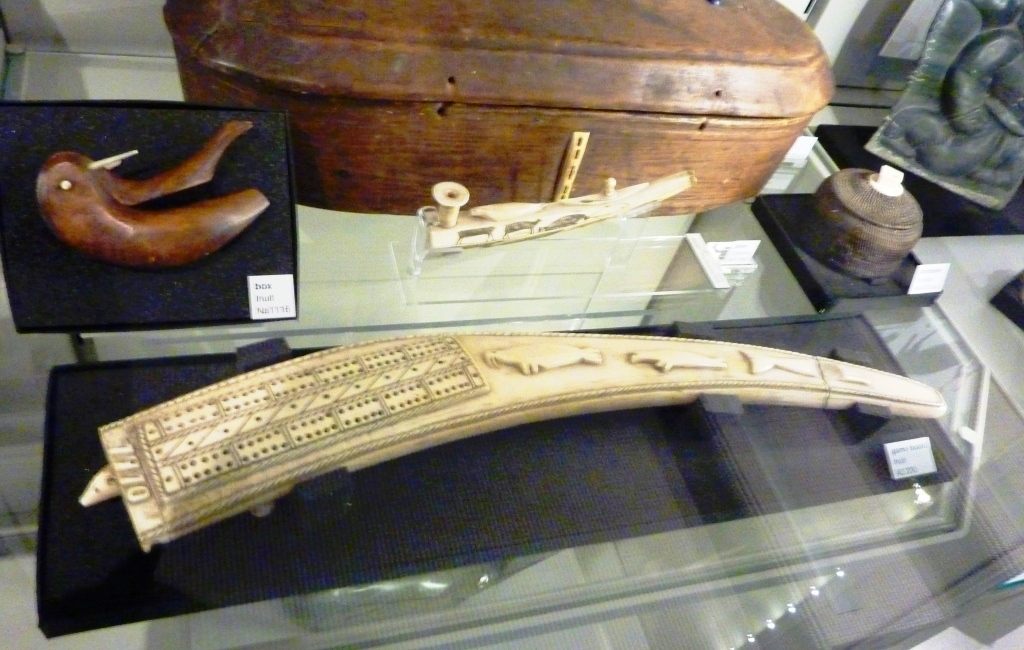
Scrimshaw cribbage board. Museum of Anthropology. Vancouver. 2010

Cribbage has been characterized as "Britain's national card game". According to John Aubrey, it was created by the English poet Sir John Suckling in the early 17th century as a derivation of the game "noddy". While noddy has become a historical, rarely-played game, cribbage has continued as a popular game in the English-speaking world. The objective of the game is to be the first player to score a target number of points, typically 61 or 121. Points are scored for showing certain jacks, playing the last card, for card combinations adding up to 15 or 31, and for pairs, triples, quadruples (cards of the same rank), runs (sequences of consecutive numbers irrespective of suit) and flushes (sets of cards of the same suit).

The earliest rules were published in England and appear in Cotgrave (1662) and are soon followed by Willughby (1672) and Cotton (1674).

The continuing popularity of cribbage is due in some part to the influence of the Victorian novelist Charles Dickens, who depicted the game in his novel The Old Curiosity Shop.

Cribbage was popular among prospectors in the American West, and the small mining town of Nelson, Montana, to this day has a sign proclaiming it the "Cribbage Capital of the World".

Cribbage is played by American submariners, serving as a common pastime. The wardroom of the oldest active submarine in the United States Pacific Fleet carries on board the personal cribbage board of World War II submarine commander and Medal of Honor recipient Rear Admiral Dick O'Kane, and upon the boat's decommissioning, the board is transferred to the next-oldest boat.

== Rules ==
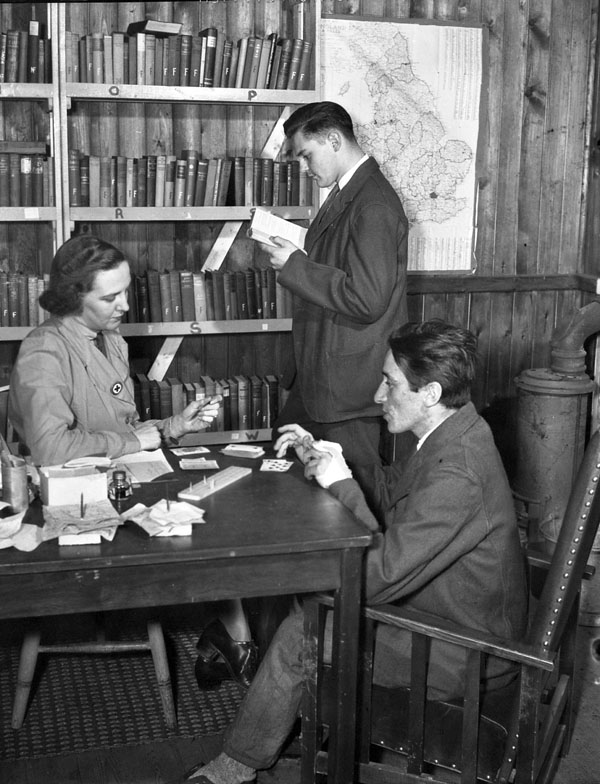
A game of cribbage being played

Play proceeds through a succession of "hands", each hand consisting of a "deal", "the play" and "the show". At any time during any of these stages, if a player reaches the target score (usually 121), play ends immediately with that player being the winner of the game. This can even happen during the deal, since the dealer scores if a jack is cut as the starter.

=== Deal ===
The players cut for first deal, and the person who cuts the lowest card deals. The dealer shuffles and deals five or six cards to each player, depending on the number of players. For two players, each is dealt six cards; for three or four players, each is dealt five cards. In the case of three players, a single card is dealt face down in the centre of the table to start the crib. Once the cards have been dealt, each player chooses four cards to retain, then discards the other one or two face-down to form the "crib" (also called the box), which is used later by the dealer.

At this point, each player's hand and the crib contain exactly four cards. The player on the dealer's left or, in a two-player game, the pone, cuts the remaining pack. The dealer reveals the top card of the lower half, called the "starter card" or "cut", and places it face up on top of the reunited pack. If this card is a jack, the dealer scores two points for "his heels" or "his nibs".

=== Play ===
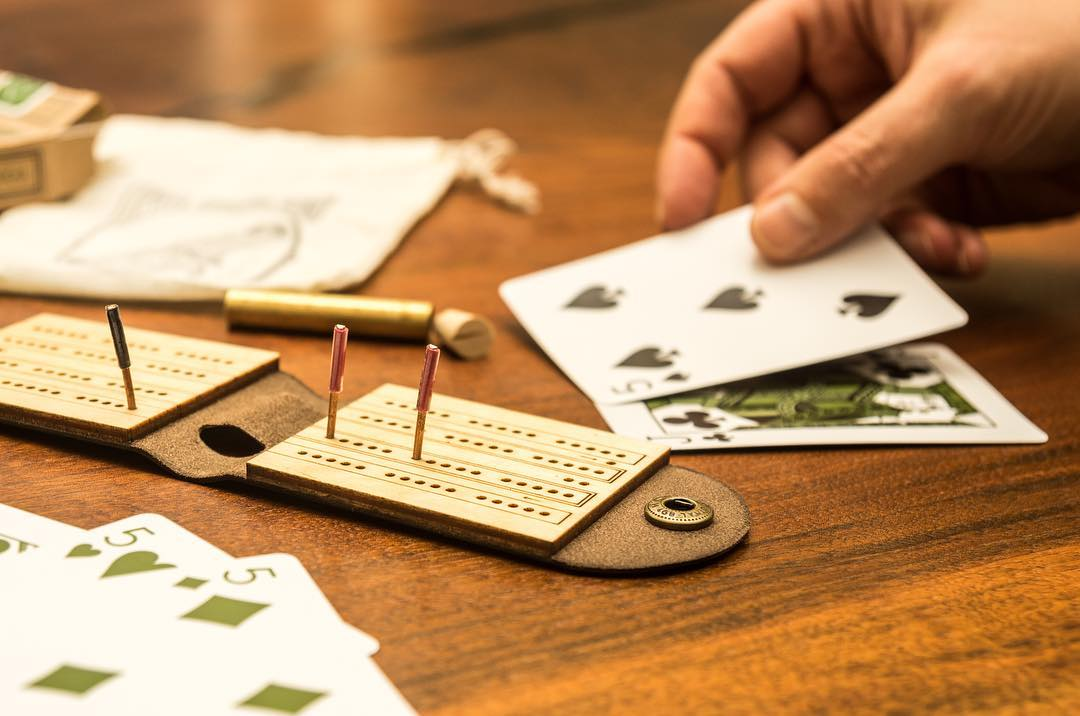
Cribbage being played with a travel-sized scoring board

Starting with the player on the dealer's left, the players each, in turn, lay one card face up on the table in front of them, stating the count—that is, the cumulative value of the cards that have been laid (for example, the first player lays a five and says "five", the next lays a six and says "eleven", and so on)—without the count going above 31. Face cards (kings, queens, and jacks) count as 10. The cards are not laid in the centre of the table as, at the end of the "play", each player needs to pick up the cards they have laid.

Players score points during the play as follows:

- 15 – For causing the count to reach exactly 15 a player scores two points, then play continues.
- Pair – Completing a pair (two of a kind) scores two points.
  - Three of a kind is the same as three different pairs, or 6 points.
  - Four of a kind is 6 different pairs, or 12 points.
- A run of three or more cards (consecutively played, but not necessarily in order) scores the number of cards in the run. For instance, if the cards played in order are 7, then 5, then 6, this run counts for 3 points for whoever laid the third card (the 6), even though the cards were not laid as 5, then 6, then 7. If an 8 is laid next, that player scores 4 points (for completing a run of four cards: 7, 5, 6 and then 8). Similarly, laying a 5 on a run of 3, 7, 6, and 4, scores 5 points for the run of 3, 7, 6, 4, and 5.

If a player cannot play without causing the count to exceed 31, they call "Go". Continuing with the player on their left, the other players continue the play until no one can play without the count exceeding 31. A player is obliged to play a card unless there is no card in their hand that can be played without the count exceeding 31. (One cannot voluntarily pass if he or she can legally play a card.) Once 31 is reached or no one is able to play, the player who played the last card scores 1 point if the count is still under 31, and 2 if it is exactly 31. The count is then reset to zero and those players with cards remaining in their hands repeat the process starting with the player to the left of the player who played the last card. When all players have played all of their cards the game proceeds to the "show".

Players choose the order in which to lay their cards during the pegging phase in order to maximize their scores; experienced players refer to this as either good or poor "pegging" or "pegsmanship". If one player reaches the target (usually 61 or 121), the game ends immediately and that player wins. When the scores are level during a game, the players' pegs are side by side, and it is thought that this gave rise to the phrase "level pegging".

=== Show ===
Once the play is complete, each player in turn, starting with the player on the left of the dealer, displays their own hand on the table and scores points based on its content in conjunction with the starter card. Points are scored for:

- Combinations of any number of cards totalling fifteen score 2 points each.
- Runs (minimum of three cards) score 1 point for each card.
- Pairs score 2 points each. Multiple pairs are scored pair by pair but may be referred to as three- or four-of-a-kind. Three-of-a-kind forms three distinct pairs, and may be referred to as a "pair royal", while four-of-a-kind forms six distinct pairs, and may be referred to as a "double pair royal".
- Four-card flushes (all four cards in the hand of the same suit) score 4 points.
- Five-card flushes (all four cards in the hand of the same suit as the starter card) score 5 points. A flush in the crib must be a five-card flush according to the official rules of the ACC.
- Having a jack of the same suit as the starter card scores 1 point (referred to as "one for his nob [or nobs or nibs]" or sometimes the "right" jack).

Each distinct combination of cards that form one of these is counted separately, giving rise to hands such as a "double run" (e.g. A-A-2-3) worth 8 for a run of three or 10 for a run of four (two runs of three/four plus a pair), a "triple run" (e.g. A-A-A-2-3) worth 15 (three runs of three plus three pairs/a pair royal), or a "double-double run" (e.g. A-A-2-2-3) worth 16 (four runs of three plus two pairs).

The dealer scores their hand last and then turns the cards in the crib face up. These cards are then scored by the dealer as an additional hand, also in conjunction with the starter card. Unlike the dealer's own hand, the crib cannot score a four-card flush, but it can score a five-card flush with the starter.

All scores from 0 to 29 are possible, with the exception of 19, 25, 26 and 27. Players may refer colloquially to a hand scoring zero points as a "nineteen hand".

=== Muggins ===
Muggins is a commonly used but optional rule, which must be announced before game play begins and exact rules worked out. If a player fails to claim their full score on any turn, the opponent may call out "Muggins" and peg any points overlooked by the player.

=== Match ===
A match (much like tennis) consists of more than one game, often an odd number. The match points are scored on the cribbage board using the holes reserved for match points. On a spiral board, these are often at the bottom of the board in a line with 5 or 7 holes. On a conventional board, they are often in the middle of the board or at the top or bottom.

In a two-player game of cribbage, a player scores one match point for winning a game. Their opponent starts as dealer in the next game. If a player lurches (British) or skunks (US) their opponent (reaches 121 points before their opponent scores 91 points), that player wins two match points for that game. If a player double skunks their opponent (reaches 121 points before their opponent reaches 61), they score three or four match points for the game, depending on local convention. If a player triple skunks their opponent (reaches 121 points before their opponent reaches 31 points), they automatically win the match. Double and triple skunks are not included in the official rules of cribbage play and are optional. There are several different formats for scoring match points.

Match point scoring
Scoring Variation	Points for ...			
Scoring Variation	Normal win	Skunking opponent	Double skunking opponent	Triple skunking opponent
Official Tournament rules (American Cribbage Congress)	2 points	3 points	Inapplicable	Inapplicable
Long Match scoring	3 points	4 points	Inapplicable	Inapplicable
Free play rules	1 point	2 points	3 or 4 points	Inapplicable
Free play rules with triple skunk	1 point	2 points	4 points	Immediate match win

== Cribbage board ==
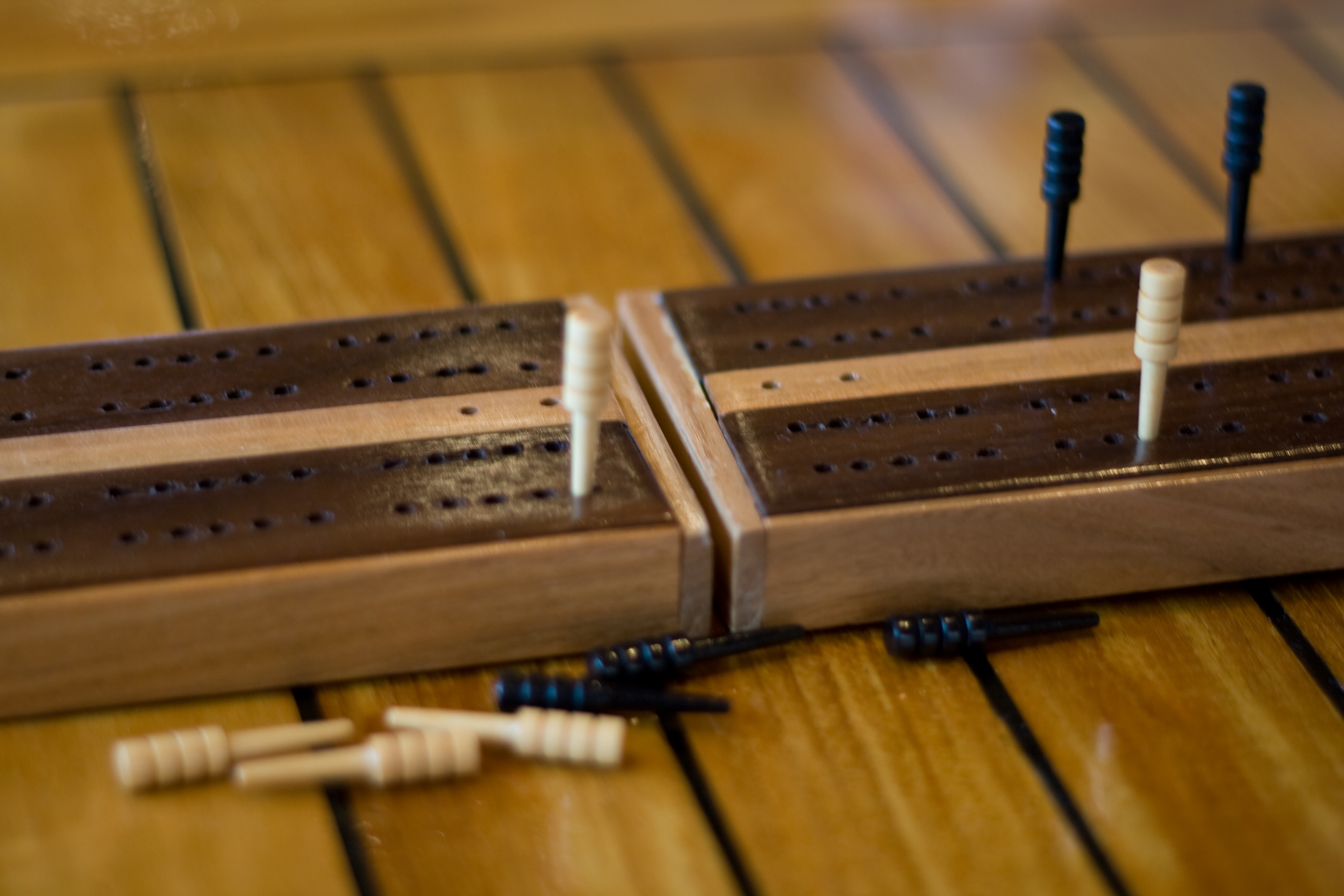
Traditional wooden board layout with wooden pegs

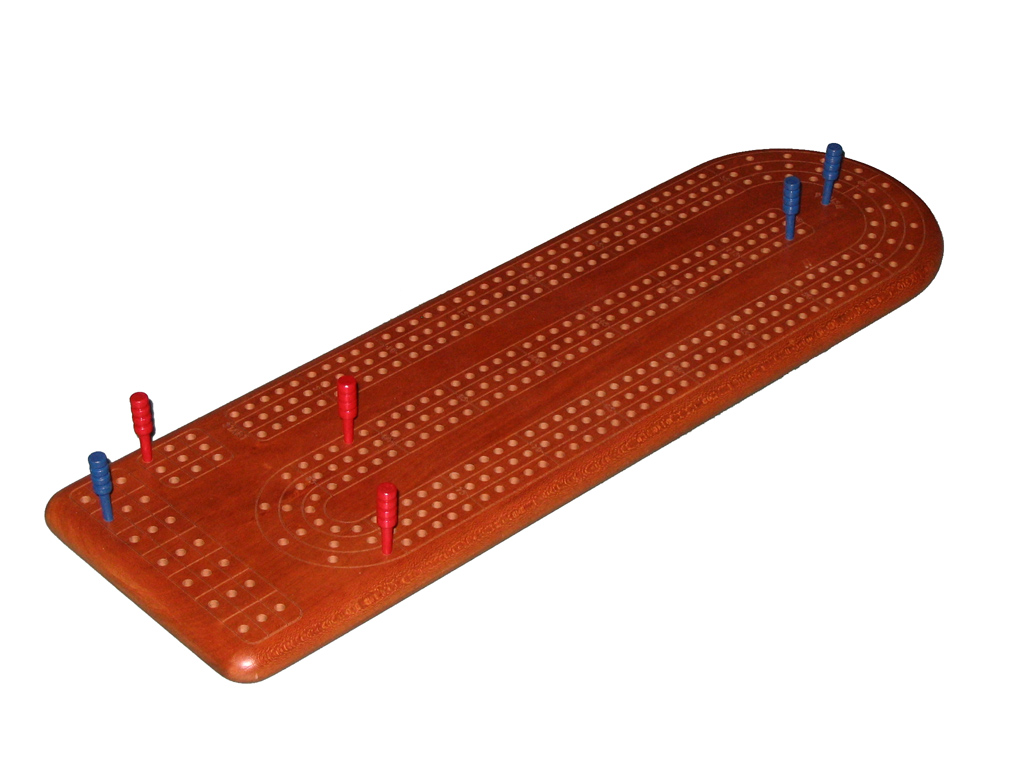
Modern 120-hole board

Visually, cribbage is known for its scoring board—a series of holes ("streets") on which the score is tallied with pegs (also known as "spilikins"). Scores can be kept on a piece of paper, but a cribbage board is almost always used, since scoring occurs throughout the game, not just at the conclusion of hands as in most other card games.

Points are registered as having been scored by "pegging" along the crib board. Two pegs are used in a leapfrog fashion, so that if a player loses track during the count one peg still marks the previous score. Some boards have a "game counter" with many additional holes for use with a third peg to count the games won by each side.

There are several designs of crib board:

- The classic design is a flat wooden board approximately 250–300 mm (10–12 in) by 70–80 mm (3–4 in) and 10–20 mm (0.4–0.8 in) deep. There are two sets of 60 holes (30 'out' and 30 'back') divided into 5 point sections. A pegging-out hole in the middle at each end allows the board to be used in either direction. One player or team scores on one set of 60 holes and the other player or team scores on the second set. Different arrangements are made for three player games.
- A relatively old design is that of an equilateral triangle with two rows of forty holes on each side. These boards did not generally include extra pegging-out holes or holes to count games.
- A newer design has three or four rows of 120 holes in a "paperclip" shape (with a pegging-out hole at the end) and is often brightly coloured. It is best suited to games played to 121, though it can also be used for 61-point games.
- Another common variation is based on features of the highest-scoring cribbage hand. The board takes the form of the number 29 (the highest possible score), with the pegging rows following the contour of the numbers "2" and "9". The design can sometimes include a background image of three fives and a jack, with the fourth five offset—the "perfect hand" giving that score. The count being 8 combinations of 15 for 16 points, 6 pairs of 2 for 12 points and a matching "nobs" jack (matching the cut card) for 1 totalling 29.

Each of the four 30-point divisions of the cribbage board (1–30, 31–60, 61–90, and 91–120) is colloquially called a "street". Being at 15 points would be on first street, being at 59 points would be on second street, etc.

== Noddy and costly colours ==
The ancestor of cribbage is noddy, a game for two or four players, each receiving just three cards and playing and scoring in a similar manner to modern cribbage. However, instead of scoring 2 points for reaching 15 or 31 (called hitter), players scored the number of constituent cards making up the point. In addition, there was originally a third point at 25. Players also scored for pairs, prials, runs and flushes as in cribbage. There was no crib and game was 31.

Costly colours may have developed separately from noddy, as it retains several original features that are no longer part of cribbage. Again, only three cards are dealt, there is no crib and it uses the same scoring scheme for points at 15, 25 and 31 or hitter. What is new is that deuces play a similar role to jacks and that players may score for colours—i.e., having three or four cards of the same suit or colour. Four cards of the same suit are costly colours, hence the name.

== See also ==
- Card game
- Cribbage statistics
- Cribbage Solitaire and Cribbage Square Solitaire, two solitaire card games based on Cribbage
- Hounds and Jackals, an Ancient Egyptian game, which uses a similar board
- Kings Cribbage, a game with cribbage hands being constructed crossword-style
- Pub games
